= Akishino-no-miya =

Royal Japanese title or miyake

Akishino-no-miya 秋篠宮
- Home province: Tokyo
- Parent house: Imperial House of Japan
- Titles: Prince Akishino; Princess Akishino
- Founder: Fumihito, Prince Akishino
- Current head: Fumihito, Prince Akishino
- Founding year: 1990

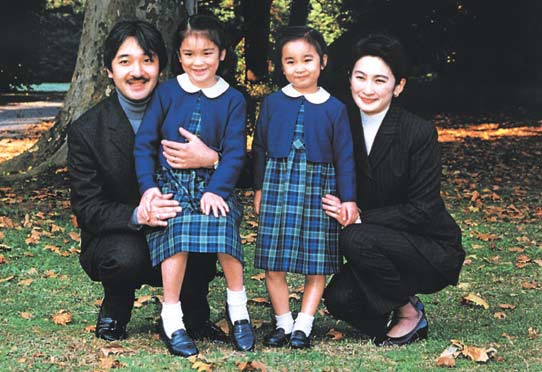
1990s photo of the Akishino family From left: Prince Akishino, Princess Mako, Princess Kako, Princess Akishino

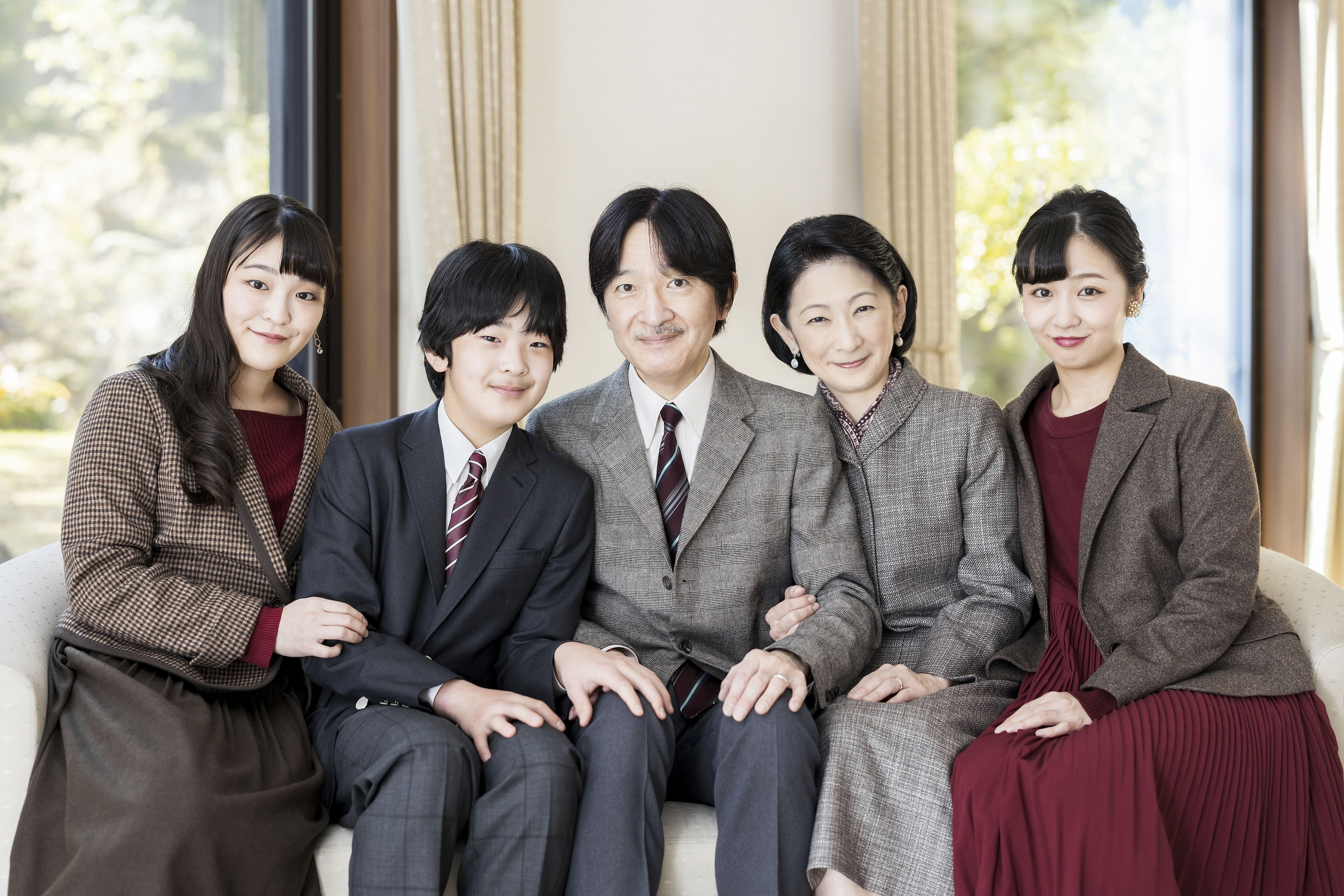
2020 photo of the Akishino family From left: Princess Mako, Prince Hisahito, Prince Akishino, Princess Akishino, Princess Kako

The Akishino-no-miya (Japanese: 秋篠宮) is a branch of the Japanese imperial family.

== Overview ==
The Akishino-no-miya was founded on June 29th, 1990, when Emperor Akihito granted Prince Fumihito permission to start a new branch of the Imperial Family upon the occasion of his marriage to Kiko Kawashima.

His title derives from Akishino Temple in Nara, a setting famous and often used in Waka poetry.

As a branch established by the son of an emperor, it is a direct miyake, and first in the order of precedence among the imperial branch families.

Members

| Name | Gender | Date of Birth | Age | Lineage | Place in Line of Succession | Notes |
|---|---|---|---|---|---|---|
| Fumihito, Crown Prince Akishino | Male | November 30, 1965 | 60 | Second son of Emperor Akihito | 1st | |
| Kiko, Crown Princess Akishino | Female | September 11, 1966 | 59 | Eldest daughter of Tatsuhiko Kawashima | | |
| Mako Komuro | Female | October 23, 1991 | 34 | Eldest daughter of Prince Fumihito | | Left the Imperial Family upon marriage to Kei Komuro on 26 October 2021. |
| Princess Kako of Akishino | Female | December 29, 1994 | 31 | Second daughter of Prince Fumihito | | |
| Prince Hisahito of Akishino | Male | September 6, 2006 | 19 | Eldest son of Prince Fumihito | 2nd | |

== Genealogy ==
125th Emperor of Japan; Emperor Akihito
126th Emperor of Japan; Emperor Naruhito | 1st Prince Akishino; Prince Fumihito | Princess Kiko
Mako Komuro | Princess Kako | Prince Hisahito

== Residence ==
Since the establishment of the Akishino family, they have resided in the Akishino Palace, located within the grounds of the Akasaka Estate in Minato, Tokyo.

When Prince Fumihito became the heir presumptive upon the ascension of Emperor Naruhito in 2019, the palace was expanded to accommodate reception facilities. During the three years in which renovations were ongoing, the Akishino family resided in the Akasaka East Palace.
