= Aiko, Princess Toshi =

Japanese princess (born 2001)

Aiko
- Princess Toshi
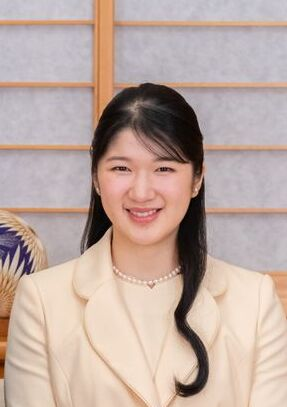
- Aiko in 2022
- Born: 1 December 2001 (age 24); Imperial Palace, Tokyo, Japan
- House: Imperial House of Japan
- Father: Naruhito
- Mother: Masako Owada

Aiko, Princess Toshi (敬宮愛子内親王, Toshi-no-miya Aiko Naishinnō; born 1 December 2001) is a member of the Imperial House of Japan. She is the only child of Emperor Naruhito and Empress Masako.

Following her birth, the ongoing Japanese imperial succession debate had resulted in some politicians holding a favorable view on rescinding agnatic primogeniture (male-only imperial succession) originally implemented in 1889 and retained by the Allies of World War II on the Constitution of Japan. However, once her uncle Crown Prince Fumihito had a son, Hisahito, in September 2006, Hisahito became second in the line of succession following his father. Aiko remains at present legally ineligible to inherit the throne and she cannot succeed her father, while debate about the possibility of having future empresses regnant continues.

== Birth ==
Princess Aiko was born on 1 December 2001 at 2:43 PM in the Imperial Household Agency Hospital in Tokyo Imperial Palace, the first and only child of Crown Prince Naruhito and Crown Princess Masako (later Emperor and Empress), during the reign of her paternal grandfather, Emperor Akihito. Due to Japanese law excluding women from inheriting the throne, she is not in the line of succession.

In a break with tradition, the name of the princess was chosen by her parents, instead of by her grandfather, Emperor Akihito. It was selected from clause 56 of Li Lou II, one of the teachings of the Chinese philosopher Mencius. Aiko, the princess' personal name, is written with the kanji characters for 'love' (愛) and 'child' (子) and means "a person who loves others". The princess also has an imperial title, Princess Toshi (敬宮, toshi-no-miya), which means "a person who respects others".

== Education ==
Princess Aiko began her education at Gakushūin Kindergarten on 3 April 2006. She left kindergarten on 15 March 2008 and then attended Gakushuin Primary School.

On her eighth birthday, it was revealed that her interests included writing kanji characters, calligraphy, jump rope, playing piano and violin, and writing poetry.

In early March 2010, Aiko began to stay home from school due to being bullied by boys in her school. Aiko returned to school on a limited basis in May 2010. After returning to school, a senior palace official said that she would attend a limited number of classes accompanied by her mother, upon advice from a doctor at the Crown Prince's household.

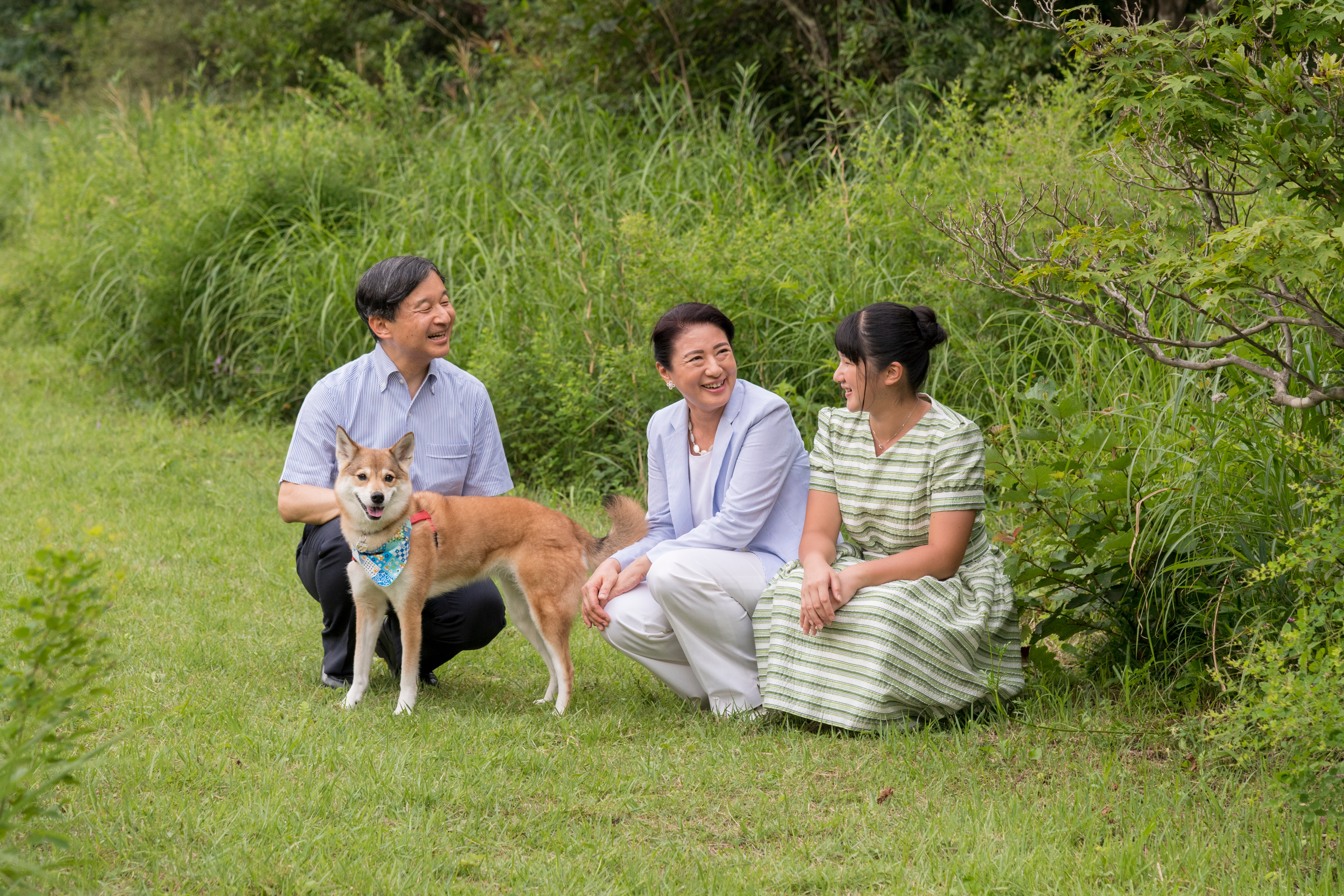
Aiko with her parents in Nasu Imperial Villa, Tochigi Prefecture in August 2019

In November 2011, Aiko was hospitalized with pneumonia. In 2014, she enrolled at the Gakushuin Girl's Junior High School.

In the summer of 2018, she made her first solo trip abroad to attend a summer program at Eton College in the United Kingdom. Reports from an unnamed palace source close to the family stated that Aiko provided her mother Masako with emotional support in her new role as empress.

In February 2020, she was accepted at Gakushuin University where she majored in Japanese language and literature.

She graduated on 20 March 2024, and stated that she will "strive to balance my official duties and work... while fulfilling my duties as a member of the Imperial Family." She wrote her senior thesis on Princess Shikishi and her waka (poetry in classical Japanese literature).

== Public life ==
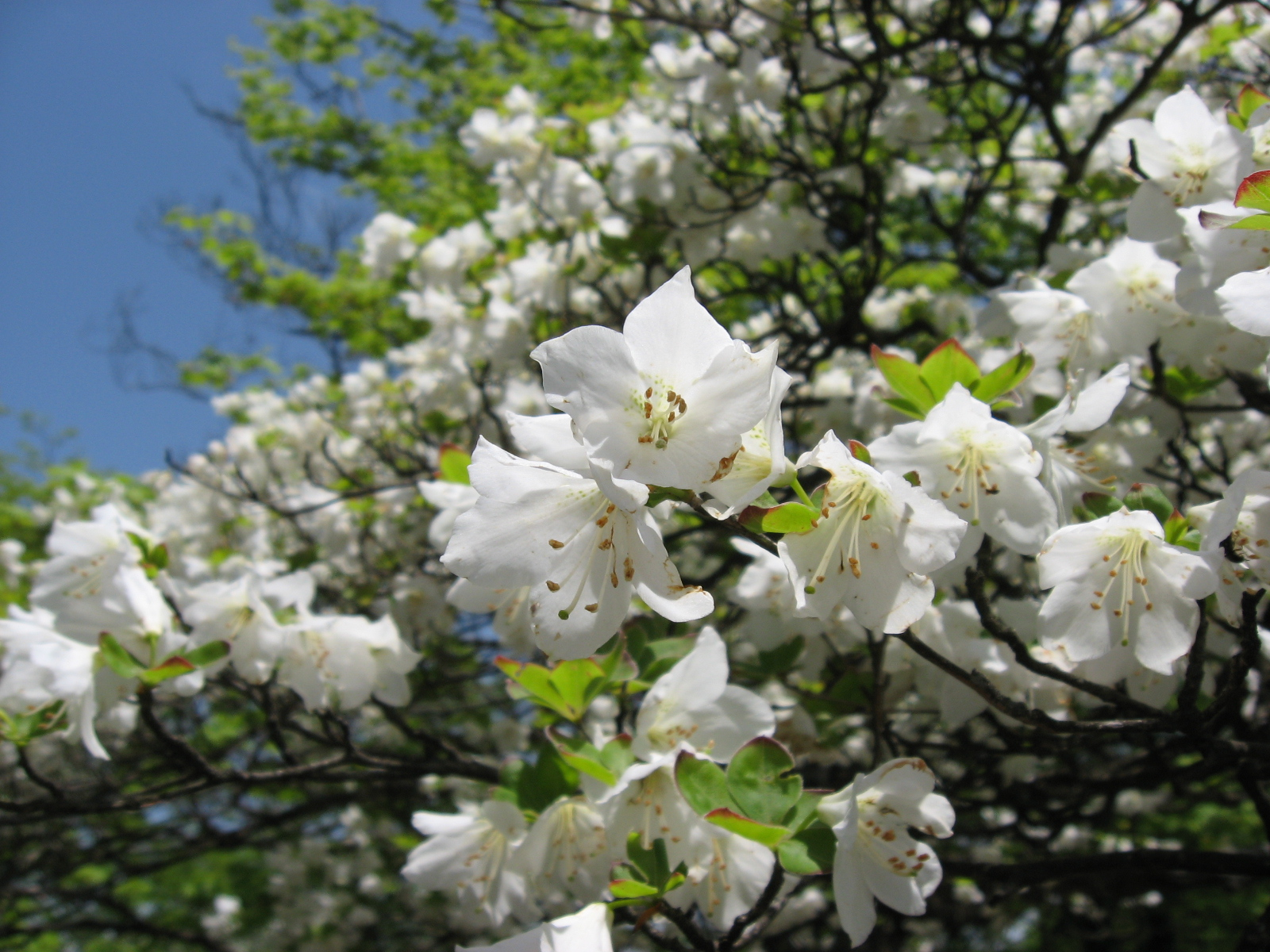
Cork azalea, Rhododendron quinquefolium, designated imperial personal emblem of Aiko

From the age of 16, Aiko began accompanying her parents at public appearances. She was ineligible to attend any of her father's accession ceremonies in person as she was still a minor at the time.

On 15 September 2021, Aiko and her parents left the Akasaka Palace and moved to the Tokyo Imperial Palace.

On 5 December 2021, the Sunday after her 20th birthday, she participated in formal coming of age ceremonies wearing a tiara borrowed from her aunt, Sayako Kuroda and was awarded the Grand Cordon of the Order of the Precious Crown by her father, Emperor Naruhito.

She attended the 2022 New Year celebration at the Imperial Palace as her first public event as a working member of the imperial family. Her first press conference took place on 17 March. Her next public outing was on 5 November, when she participated with her cousin Princess Kako of Akishino in a gagaku concert organized by the Imperial Household Agency. On 24 November, she visited an exhibition at the Tokyo National Museum with her parents.

Aiko visited Ise Jingu offering tamagushi to Amaterasu on 26 March and the mausoleum of Emperor Jimmu in Kashihara, Nara to inform his spirit of her graduation from university on 27 March. These were her first solo visits to the shrine and mausoleum. She began work at the Japanese Red Cross Society, of which her mother is honorary president, on 1 April 2024 after graduating from university.

In October 2024 she made her first official solo Imperial visit, attending a sports competition in Saga prefecture. In November 2025, she arrived in Laos as part of her first official overseas visit, commemorating 70 years of diplomatic relations between Japan and Laos.

In November 2026, she arrived in Singapore as part of her official visit, commemorating 60 years of diplomatic relations between Japan and Singapore.

== Succession to the throne ==
The Imperial Household Law of 1947 abolished the Japanese nobility; under provisions of this law, the imperial family was streamlined to the descendants of Emperor Taishō. The laws of succession in Japan prevent inheritance by or through women.

=== Debate ===
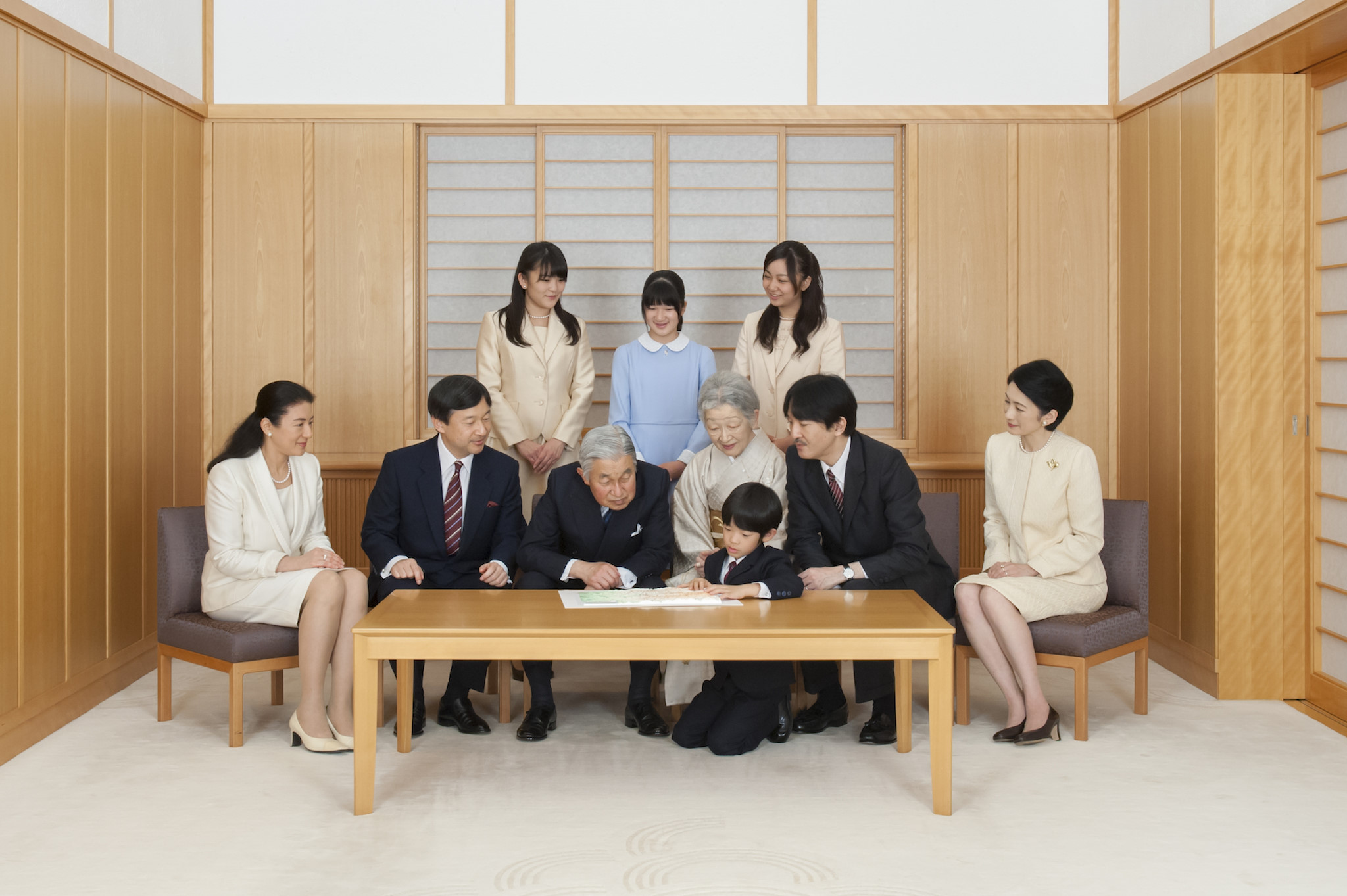
Princess Aiko (standing, center) with the imperial family (November 2013)

The birth of Princess Aiko sparked debate in Japan about whether the Imperial Household Law of 1947 should be changed from the current system of agnatic primogeniture to absolute primogeniture, which would allow a woman, as firstborn, to inherit the Chrysanthemum Throne ahead of a younger brother or male cousin. Although imperial chronologies include ten empresses regnant as female monarchs in the course of Japanese history, their successors were always selected from amongst the members of the paternal imperial bloodline, which is why some scholars argue that the women's reigns were temporary and that male-only succession tradition must be maintained in the 21st century. Though Empress Genmei was followed on the throne by her daughter, Empress Genshō, Genshō's father, Prince Kusakabe, was also a member of the imperial dynasty, as the son of Emperor Tenmu, and therefore Genshō was a patrilineal descendant of the imperial bloodline. In addition, Empress Genshō herself was succeeded by her brother's son, thus keeping the throne in the same agnatic line; both Genshō and Genmei, as well as all other empresses regnant and emperors, belonged to the same agnatic line.

A government-appointed panel of experts submitted a report on 25 October 2005, recommending that the imperial succession law be amended to permit absolute primogeniture. On 20 January 2006, Prime Minister Junichiro Koizumi used part of his annual keynote speech to address the controversy when he pledged to submit a bill to the Diet letting women ascend to the throne in order that the imperial throne be continued into the future in a stable manner. Koizumi did not announce a timing for the legislation to be introduced nor did he provide details about the content, but he did note that it would be in line with the conclusions of the 2005 government panel.

=== Birth of male cousin ===
Proposals to replace agnatic primogeniture were shelved temporarily after it was announced in February 2006 that the-then Crown Prince's younger brother, Fumihito, Prince Akishino, and his wife, Kiko, Princess Akishino, were expecting their third child. On 6 September 2006, Princess Kiko gave birth to their first son, Hisahito, who was third in line to the Chrysanthemum Throne at the time of the birth under the current law, after his uncle, the then-Crown Prince, and his father, Prince Akishino. The prince's birth provided the first male heir to be born in the imperial family in 41 years. On 3 January 2007, Prime Minister Shinzō Abe announced that he would drop the proposal to alter the Imperial Household Law.

Surveys have shown 80% public support for a female succession. A manga by Yoshinori Kobayashi called Gōmanism Sengen Special: Aiko Tennō Ron (Japanese: 愛子天皇論; Princess Aiko as Empress) has led to debates and also been circulated amongst the members of the National Diet.

== Titles, styles and honours ==
=== Titles and styles ===
Aiko is styled as "Her Imperial Highness Princess Aiko". She also has an imperial title, "Princess Toshi" (敬宮, toshi-no-miya).

=== Honours ===
==== National honours ====
- Japan: Grand Cordon of the Order of the Precious Crown (5 December 2021)
