= Order of the Precious Crown =

Japanese order

Order of the Precious Crown 宝冠章
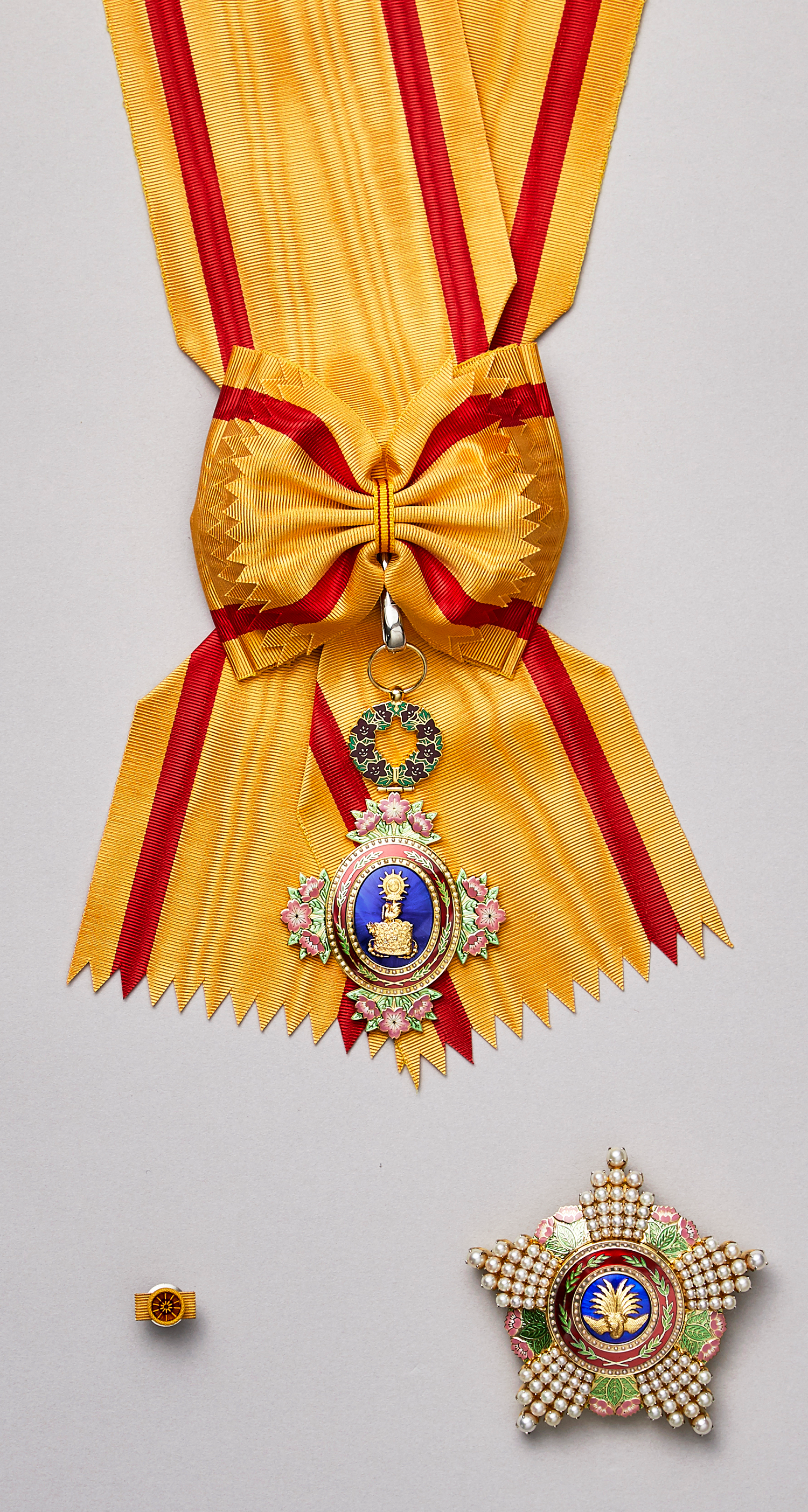
- Grand Cordon of the Order of the Precious Crown (1st class)

Awarded by the Emperor of Japan
- Type: Order
- Criteria: At the monarch's pleasure
- Status: Currently constituted
- Sovereign: HM The Emperor
- Grand Mistress: HM The Empress
- Classes: 1st through 8th Class

Precedence
- Next (higher): Order of the Chrysanthemum
- Next (lower): Order of the Sacred Treasure
- Equivalent: Order of the Paulownia Flowers

The Order of the Precious Crown (宝冠章, Hōkan-shō) is a Japanese order, established on January 4, 1888 by Emperor Meiji of Japan. Since the Order of the Rising Sun at that time was an Order for men, it was established as an Order for women. Originally the order had five classes, but on April 13, 1896 the sixth, seventh and eighth classes were added.

Until 2003, the Order of the Precious Crown, which had eight ranks, was equivalent to the Order of the Rising Sun and was awarded as a women-only version of the Order of the Rising Sun. In 2003, the Order of the Rising Sun, previously reserved for males, was made available to women as well, and the lowest two classes of the Order of the Precious Crown were abolished. Since 2003, the Order of the Precious Crown has only been given to female members of the imperial family in Japan and female members of the royal family in foreign countries only when it is specifically necessary for diplomatic ceremonies.

Since 2003, the number representing rank included in the official name of the order was removed. As a result, although numbers representing ranks were sometimes used in common names, the formal names such as 勲一等 (Kun-ittō, First Class) and 勲二等 (Kun-nitō, Second Class) were no longer used.

In 1907, medals of the Order of the Crown were bestowed upon twenty-nine Americans who participated in the Russo-Japanese War. This unusual list of honorees was composed of ten women volunteer nurses and nineteen correspondents of American newspapers.

== Classes ==
The first class honour has been typically conferred to female royalty. As originally conceived, the order consisted of eight classes. Unlike its European counterparts, the order may be conferred posthumously.

The badge of the order is a gold oval medallion, with floral designs at its four ends; at the centre is an ancient Japanese crown on a blue background, surrounded by a red ring. It is suspended from a smaller badge, its design varies according to class, on a ribbon in yellow with red stripes near the borders, as a sash on the right shoulder for the 1st class, as a bow on the left shoulder for the other classes.

The star of the order, which is worn only by the first class, has five rays studded with pearls, with floral designs between the rays. The central disc features a Ho-o or phoenix on a blue background, surrounded by a red ring emblazoned with a laurel wreath.

The medal for the 6th and 7th classes are golden bronze. The face presents the crossed flags of Japan and the Emperor, both of which are surmounted by the Rising Sun. The obverse presents a conventional monumental shaft, which is flanked by a branch of laurel and a branch of palm.

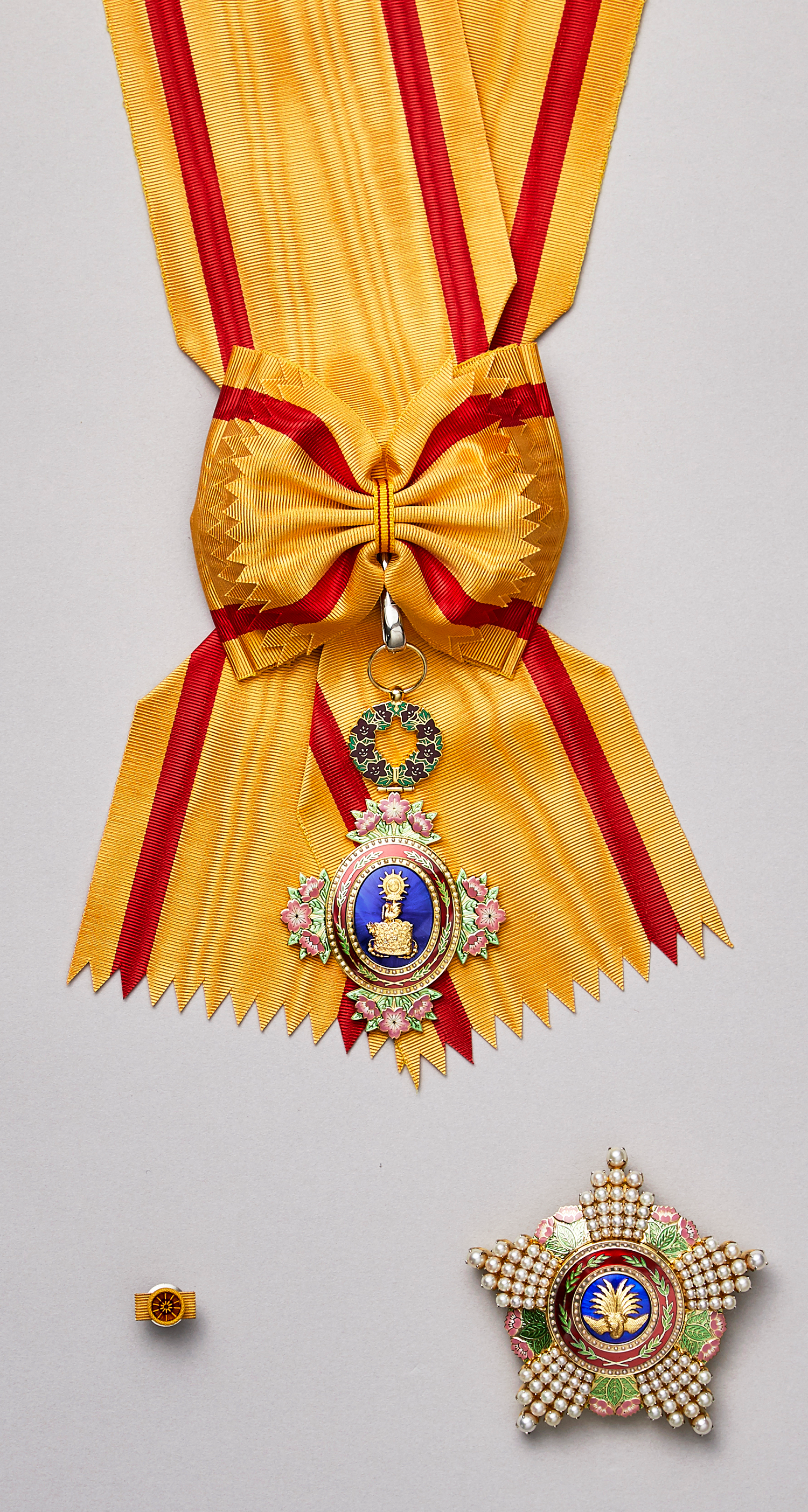
Grand Cordon of the Order of the Precious Crown (1st class)

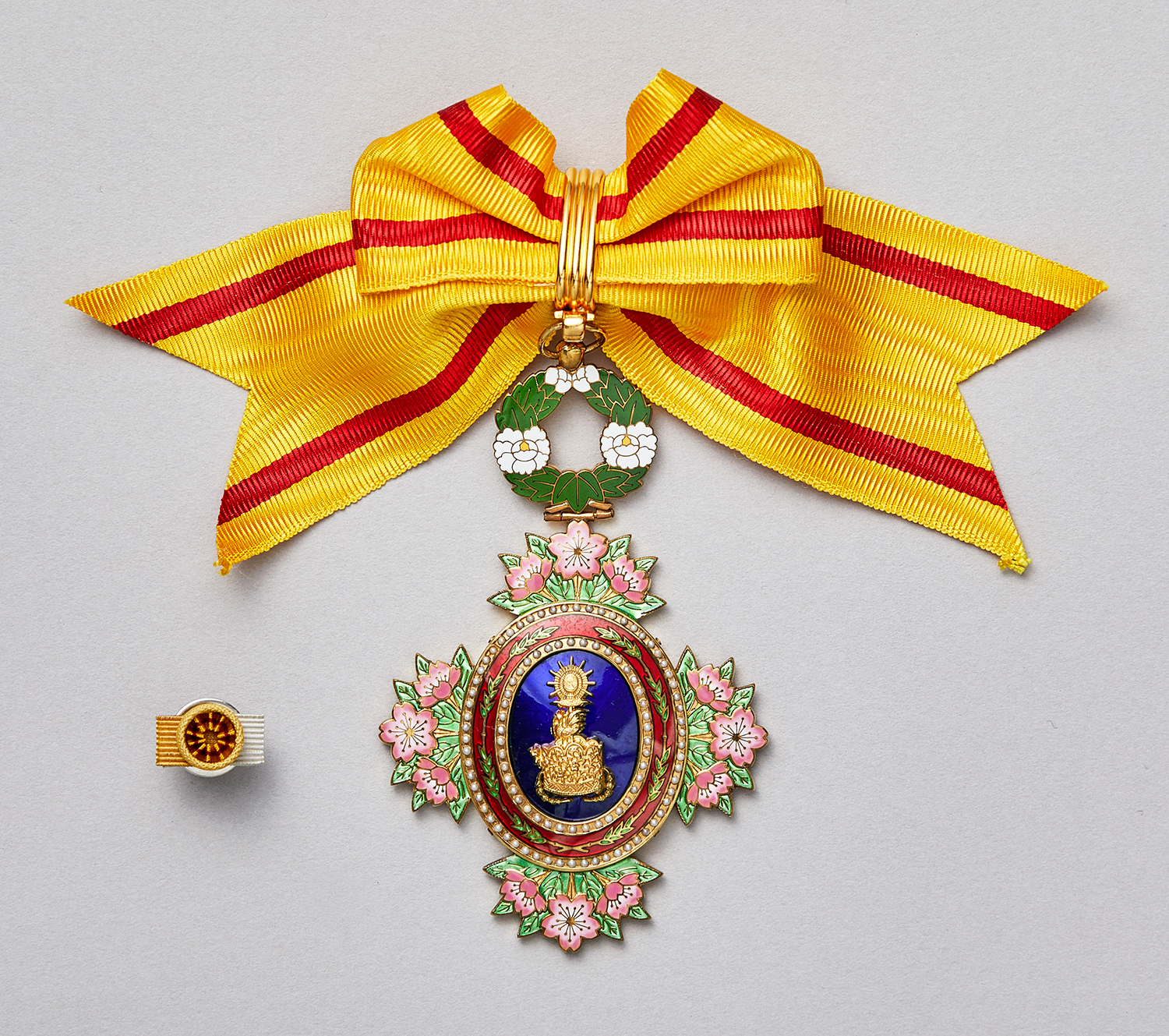
The Order of the Precious Crown, Peony (2nd class)

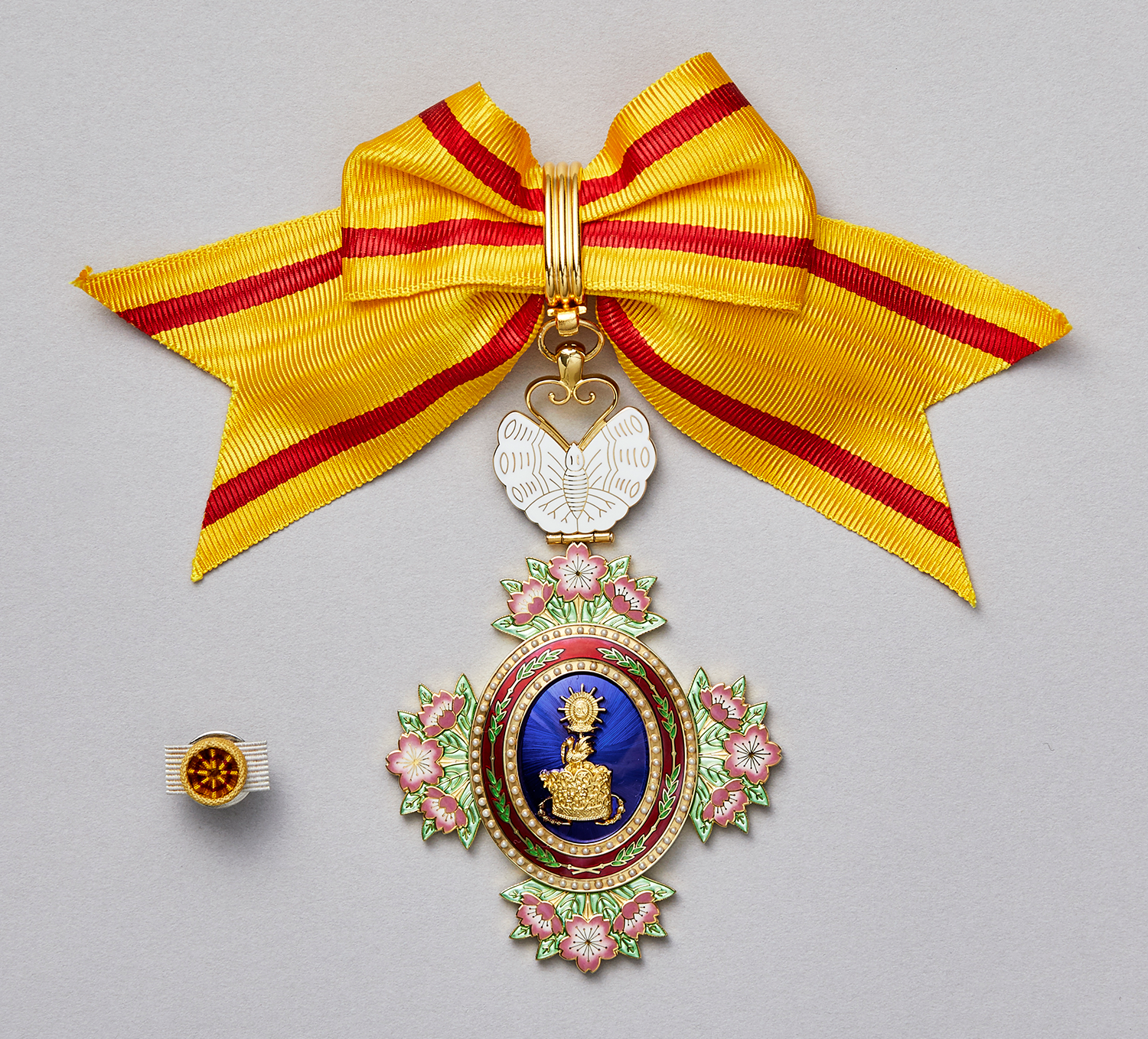
The Order of the Precious Crown, Butterfly (3rd class)

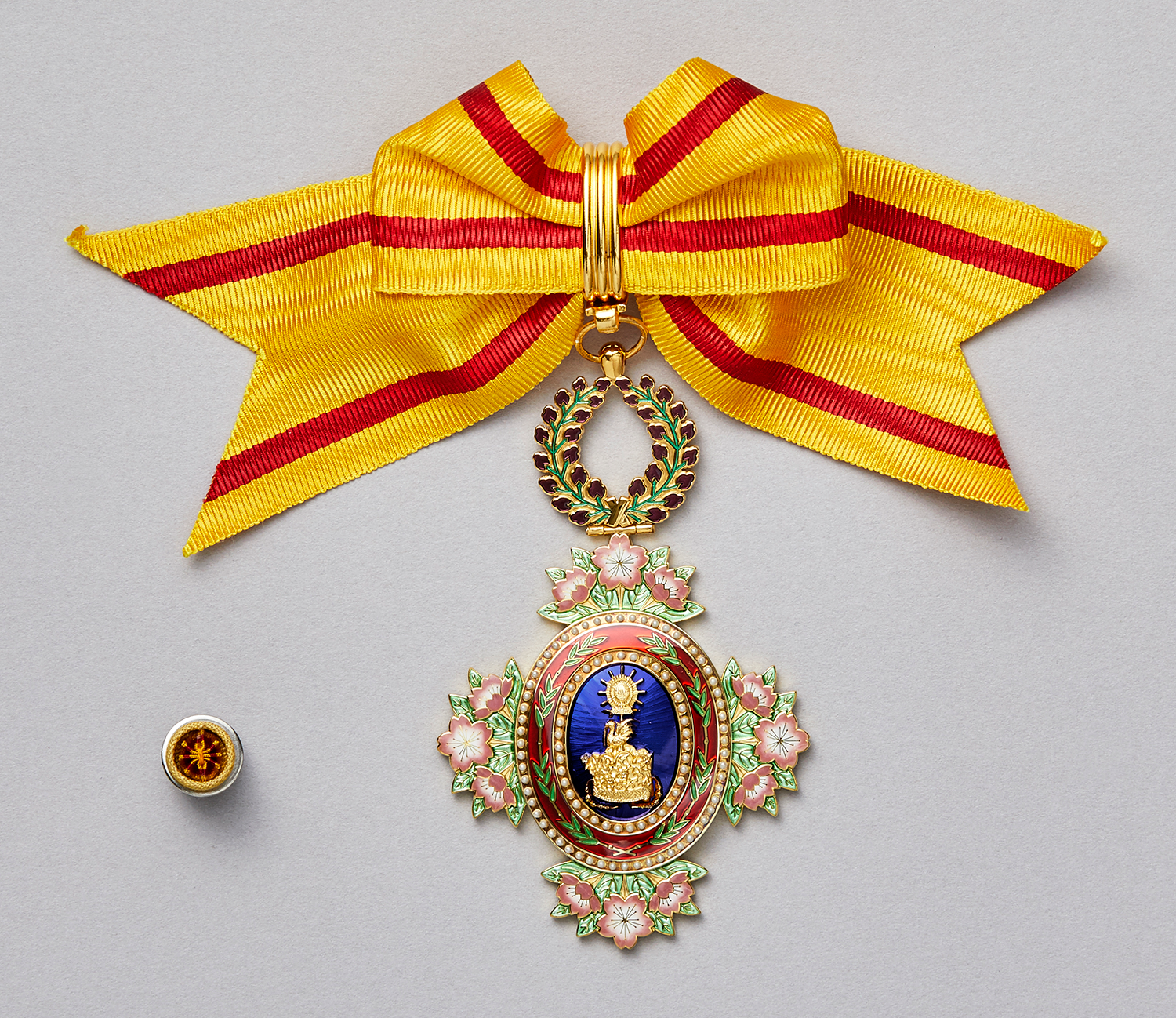
The Order of the Precious Crown, Wistaria (4th class)

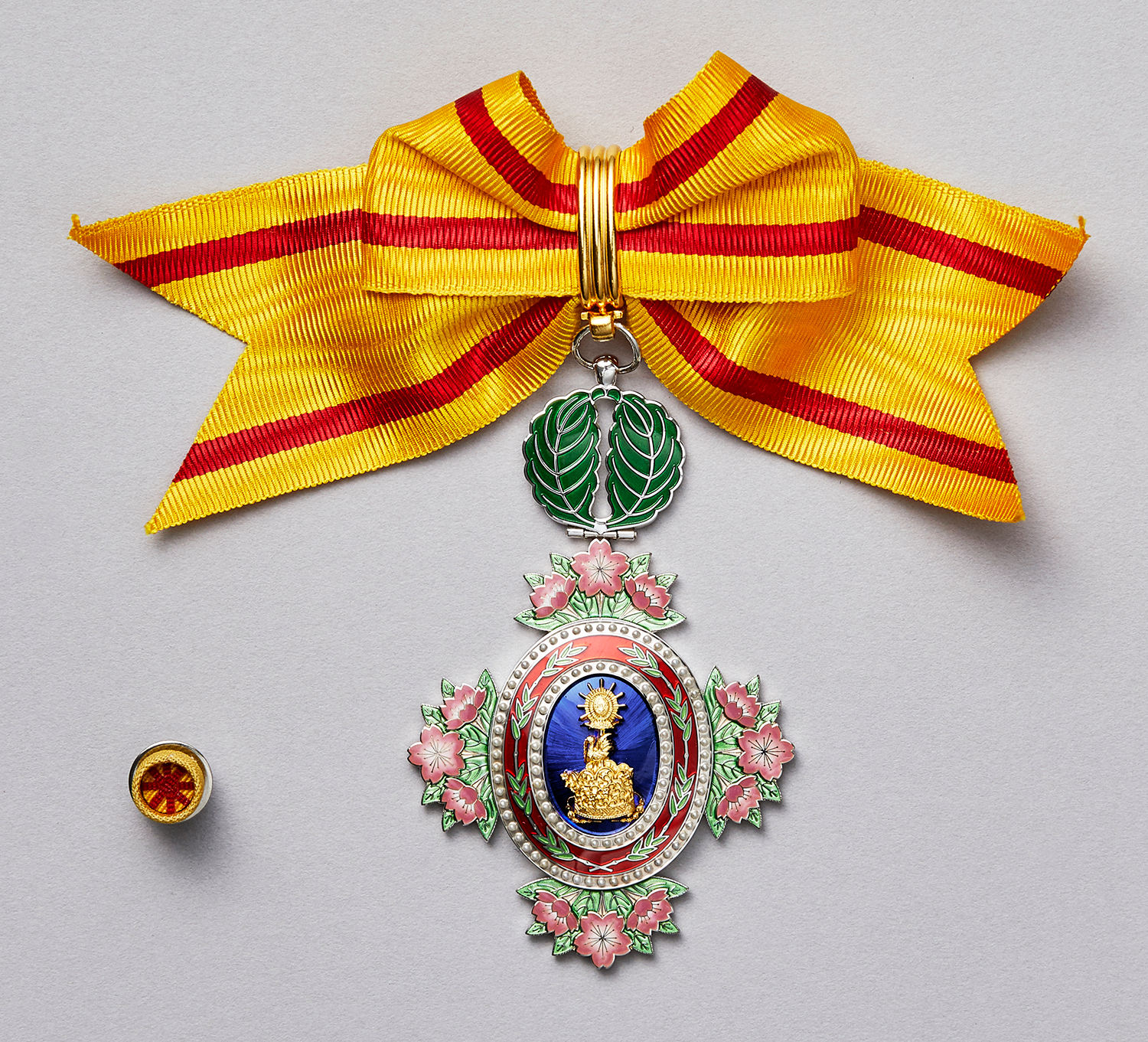
The Order of the Precious Crown, Apricot (5th class)

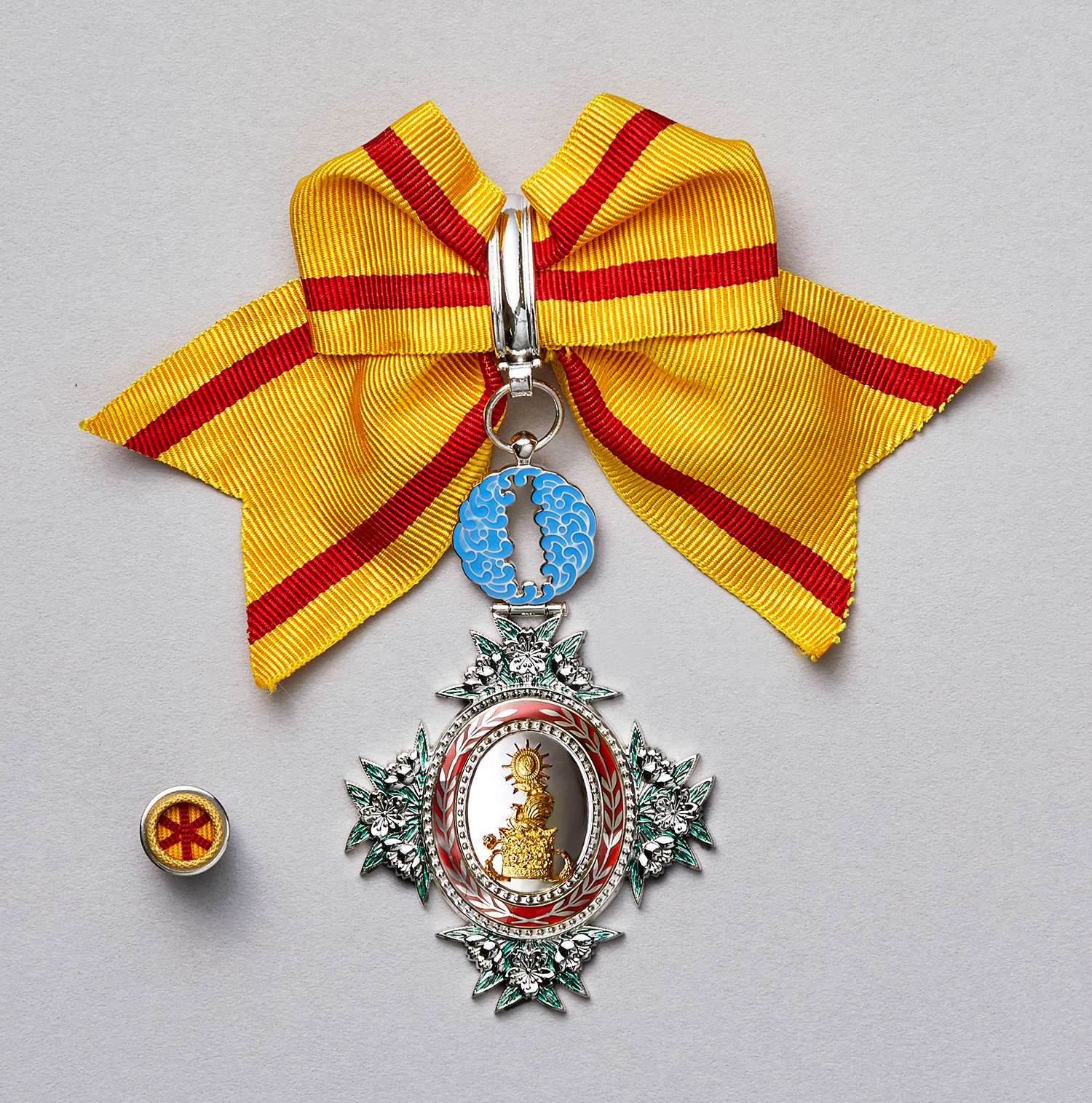
The Order of the Precious Crown, Ripple (6th class)

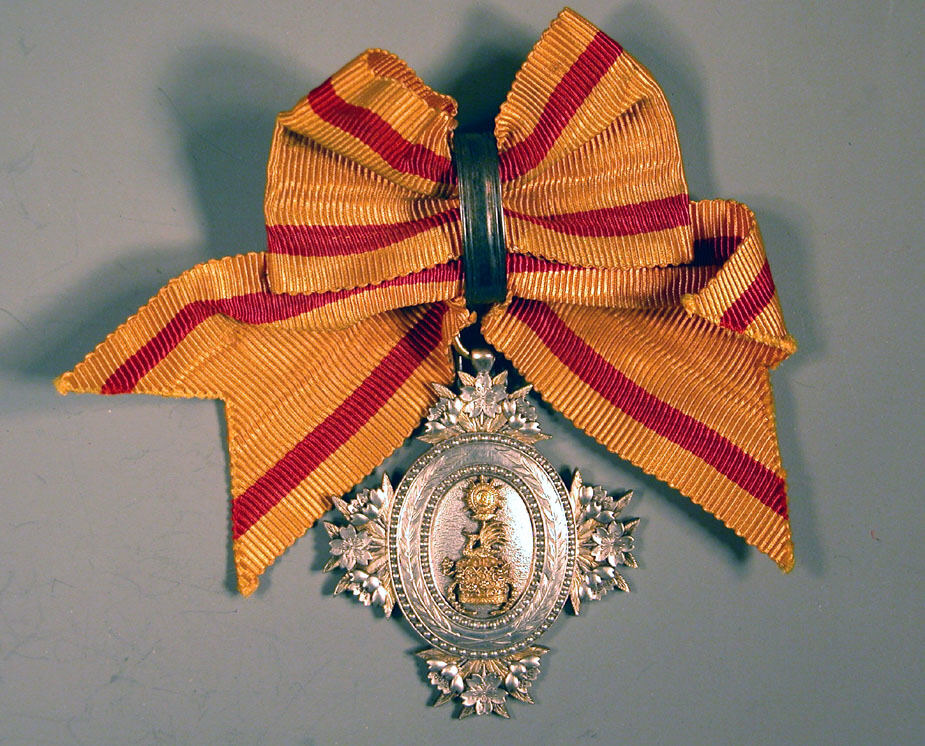
7th Class (Abolished in 2003)

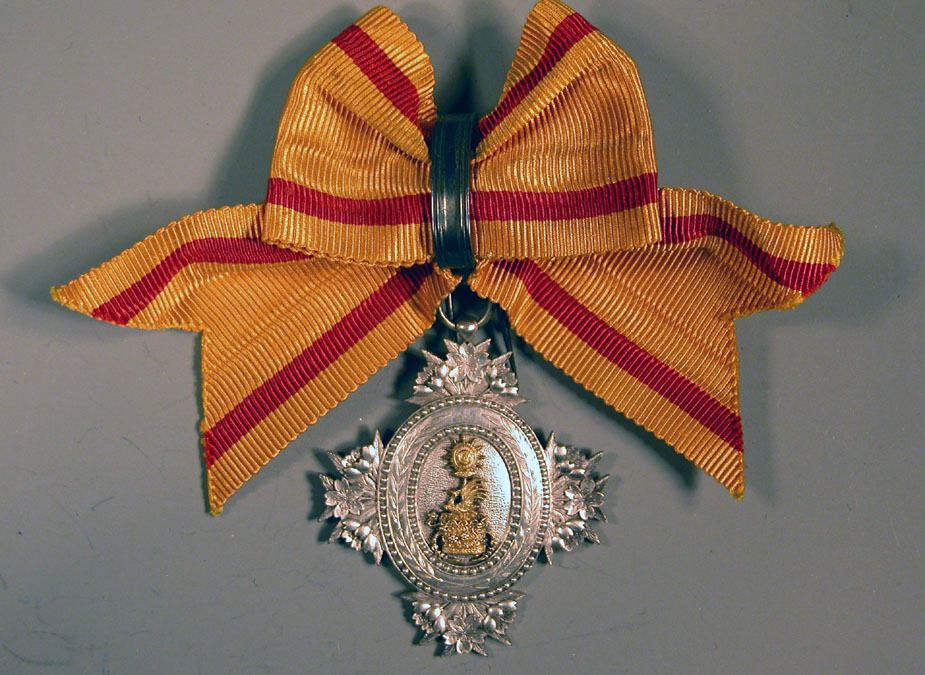
8th Class (Abolished in 2003)

Ribbon bars
Grand Cordon, Paulownia	Second Class, Peony	Third Class, Butterfly	Fourth Class, Wisteria
Fifth Class, Apricot	Sixth Class, Ripples	Seventh Class, Medal (abolished 2003)	Eighth Class, Medal (abolished 2003)

== Selected recipients ==
=== First Class, Grand Cordon ===
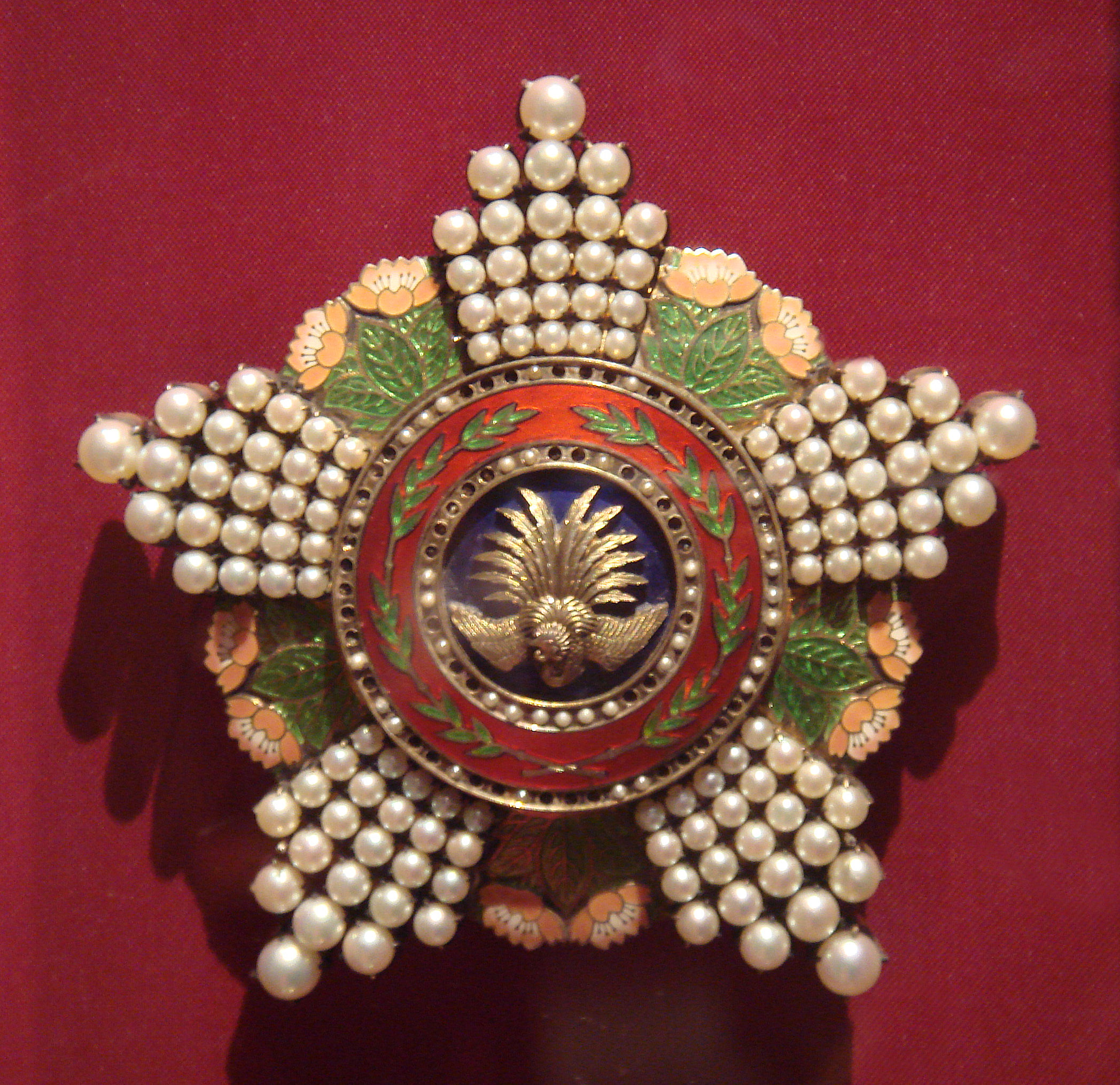
Order of the Precious Crown, 1st class plaque. End of the 19th century. Musée de la Légion d'honneur.

- Empress Michiko
- Empress Masako
- Kiko, Crown Princess Akishino
- Aiko, Princess Toshi
- Mako Komuro
- Princess Kako of Akishino
- Sayako Kuroda
- Maria Teresa, Grand Duchess of Luxembourg
- Princess Salote Mafile'o Pilolevu Tuita of Tonga
- Queen Margrethe II of Denmark
- Empress Farah of Iran
- Queen Elizabeth the Queen Mother
- Queen Paola of Belgium
- Queen Silvia of Sweden
- Queen Sirikit of Thailand
- Queen Máxima of the Netherlands
- Queen Mathilde of Belgium
- Queen Sofía of Spain
- Queen Letizia of Spain
- Queen Mette-Marit of Norway
- Queen Sonja of Norway
- Crown Princess Bangja of Korea
- Tuanku Budriah of Malaysia
- Tuanku Bainun of Malaysia
- Tuanku Fauziah of Malaysia
- Tuanku Hajah Haminah Hamidun of Malaysia
- Princess Madeleine of Sweden
- Princess Srinagarindra of Thailand
- Princess Sirindhorn of Thailand
- Princess Chulabhorn of Thailand
- Princess Margaret, Countess of Snowdon
- Princess Alexandra, The Honourable Lady Ogilvy
- Mette-Marit, Crown Princess of Norway
- Princess Basma bint Talal of Jordan
- Empress Dowager Cixi of China
- Queen Liliʻuokalani of Hawaii
- Queen Kapiʻolani of Hawaii
- Te Atairangikaahu
- Princess Sarvath al-Hassan of Jordan
- Princess Alia bint Hussein of Jordan
- Margaret, Baroness Thatcher, (former Prime Minister of the United Kingdom)
- Imelda Romualdez Marcos, (former First Lady of the Philippines)
- Siti Hartinah (former First Lady of the Republic of Indonesia)
- Liza Araneta Marcos

=== Second Class, Peony ===
- Noriko Senge
- Princess Tsuguko of Takamado
- Ayako Moriya
- Princess Akiko of Mikasa
- Princess Yōko of Mikasa
- Princess Alexandra of Luxembourg
- Princess Ariane of the Netherlands
- Princess Laurentien of the Netherlands

=== Third Class, Butterfly ===
- Joyce Ackroyd, 1918–1991
- Eleanor Jorden, 1920–2009
- Elizabeth Gray Vining, 1902–1999
- Lillian Moller Gilbreth, 1878–1972, Honor conferred 1968
- Yoshi Kasuya, 1894–1994
- Chika Kuroda, 1884–1968
- Margaret Sanger, 1879–1966, Honor conferred 1965
- Sugino Yoshiko, 1892-1978
- Kono Yasui, 1880–1971
- Toshiko Yuasa, 1909–1980

=== Fourth Class, Wistaria ===
- Michiyo Tsujimura (1888–1969)
- Miwa Kai (1913–2011)
- Yvette Giraud (1916–2014)
- Machiko Hasegawa (1920–1992)
- Cayetana Fitz-James Stuart, 18th Duchess of Alba (1926–2014)

=== Fifth Class, Apricot ===
- Fujima Kansuma (1918–2023)
- Helen Kawagoe (1927–2020)

=== Sixth Class, Ripple ===
- Anita Newcomb McGee,(1864–1940)
- Fumiko Kouka Mikami, (1913–2019)

=== Seventh Class ===
- William H. Brill, (1871–1923), Associated Press and Reuter's Telegram Company
- Richard Harding Davis, (1864–1916) Collier's Weekly
- John Fox, Jr., (1862–1919) Scribner's Magazine
- George Kennan, (1845–1924) The Outlook
- Jack London, (1876–1916) Hearst papers.
- Frederick Palmer, (1873–1958) Collier's Weekly
- Herbert Ponting, photographer and journalist, (1870–1935), Harper's Weekly
- James Ricalton, (c. 1844 – 1929) Travel Magazine
- Grant Wallace, (1867–1954) San Francisco Bulletin
- Niijima Yae, (1845–1932)

== See also ==
- Order of Chula Chom Klao (Thailand)
