= Kiko, Crown Princess of Japan =

Member of the Japanese imperial family (born 1966)

Kiko
- Crown Princess Akishino
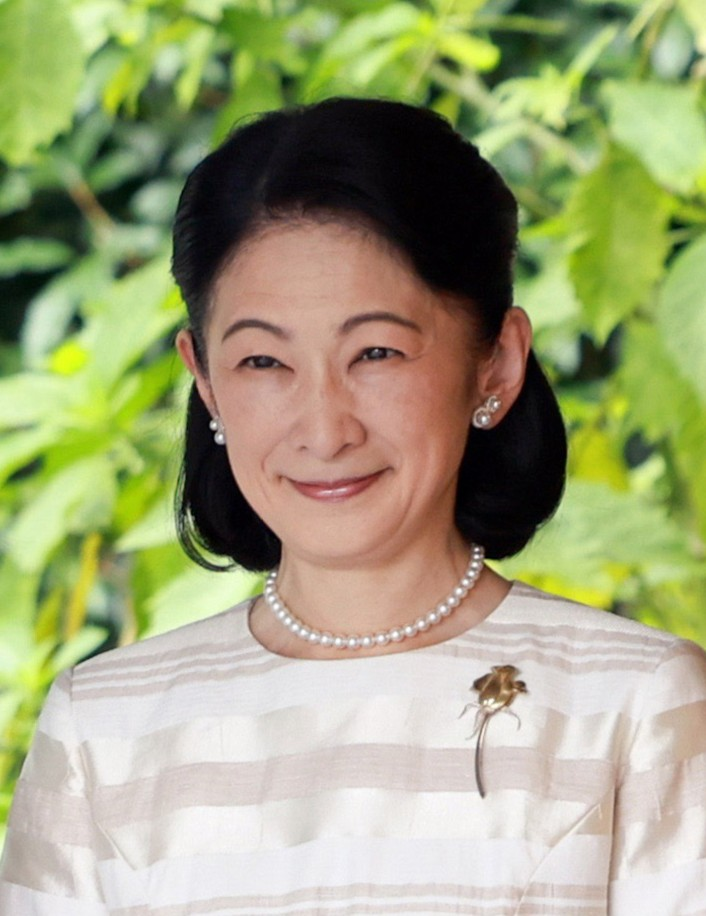
- Kiko in 2025
- Born: Kiko Kawashima (川嶋紀子); 11 September 1966 (age 60); Suruga-ku, Shizuoka, Japan
- Spouse: Fumihito, Crown Prince of Japan (m. 1990)
- Issue: Mako Komuro; Princess Kako of Akishino; Prince Hisahito of Akishino
- House: Imperial House of Japan (by marriage)
- Father: Tatsuhiko Kawashima
- Mother: Kazuyo Sugimoto

Kiko, Crown Princess Akishino (皇嗣文仁親王妃紀子, Kōshi Fumihito Shinnō-hi Kiko) (born Kiko Kawashima (川嶋紀子, Kawashima Kiko); 11 September 1966) is a member of the Imperial House of Japan. She is married to Crown Prince Fumihito, the heir presumptive to the Japanese throne.

Kiko earned a doctoral degree in humanities from Ochanomizu University. Her marriage to Prince Fumihito in 1990 reflected a trend in which members of the imperial family married academically accomplished commoners from the middle class, continuing a pattern observed in previous and current generations. The couple has three children: Mako, Kako, and Hisahito.

Prior to their investiture as Crown Prince and Crown Princess, the ongoing Japanese imperial succession debate had prompted discussions among some lawmakers about revising the male-only succession rule (agnatic primogeniture) established by the Allies of World War II in the postwar constitution of Japan. The birth of Prince Hisahito in September 2006, however, secured the line of succession for male heirs, placing him immediately after his father. Hisahito's cousin, Princess Aiko, the only child of Emperor Naruhito, remains legally ineligible to inherit the throne, though debate continues over the potential for future empresses regnant.

As active working members of the imperial family, Kiko and Fumihito regularly participate in official duties, including attendance at summits, organizational meetings, and international events. They frequently represent the Imperial Household at ceremonies involving heads of state and other dignitaries abroad. Kiko's patronages focus primarily on medical, scientific, and children's welfare initiatives.

== Early life ==
Kiko was born at Shizuoka Saiseikai General Hospital in Shizuoka, Japan. She is the eldest daughter of Tatsuhiko Kawashima (1940–2021) and his wife, Kazuyo Sugimoto (born 1942). The family moved to Philadelphia in 1967 while her father attended the University of Pennsylvania. He earned a doctorate at the University of Pennsylvania in 1971 in regional science and later taught there.

Kiko attended elementary and high school in Vienna, Austria, when her father became the chief researcher at the International Institute for Applied Systems Analysis (IIASA) in Laxenburg, Austria, where he studied spatial science and NGO activities. The future princess became fluent in English and German. In 1972, they moved back to Japan, where her father taught economics at Gakushuin University in Tokyo. She lived with her parents and younger brother in a small on-campus apartment in Tokyo. She graduated from the Department of Psychology in the Faculty of Letters of Gakushuin University with a Bachelor of Letters degree in psychology in 1989 and received a Master of Humanities degree in social psychology from the Graduate School of Gakushuin University in 1995. She received a Doctor of Philosophy degree in humanities from Ochanomizu University.

She participated in the Ship for Southeast Asian and Japanese Youth Program (SSEAYP) in 1987 and continues to be a supporter of the program.

== Marriage ==
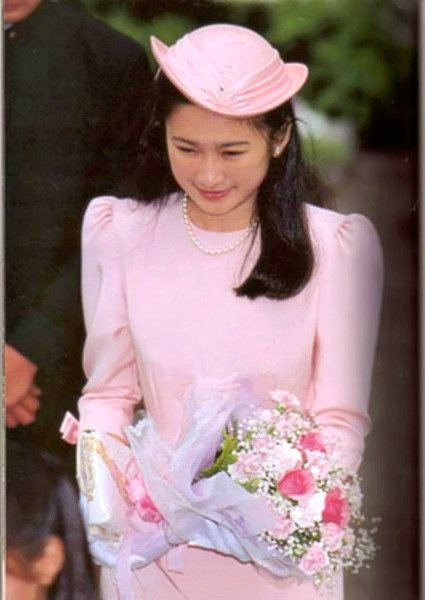
A newly engaged Kiko Kawashima in 1990

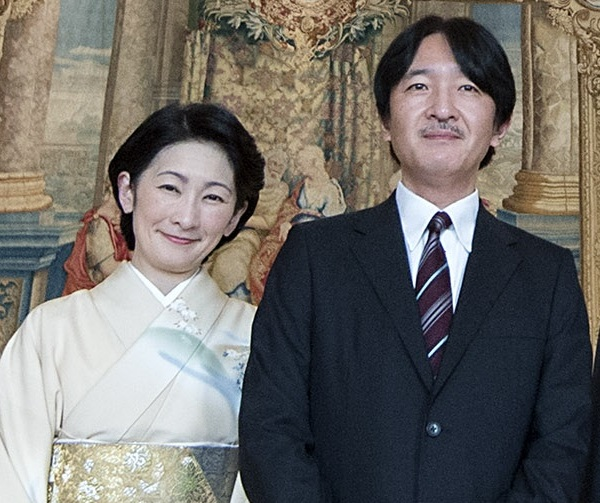
Crown Princess Kiko and Crown Prince Fumihito in 2016, the year after their silver wedding anniversary (25 years)

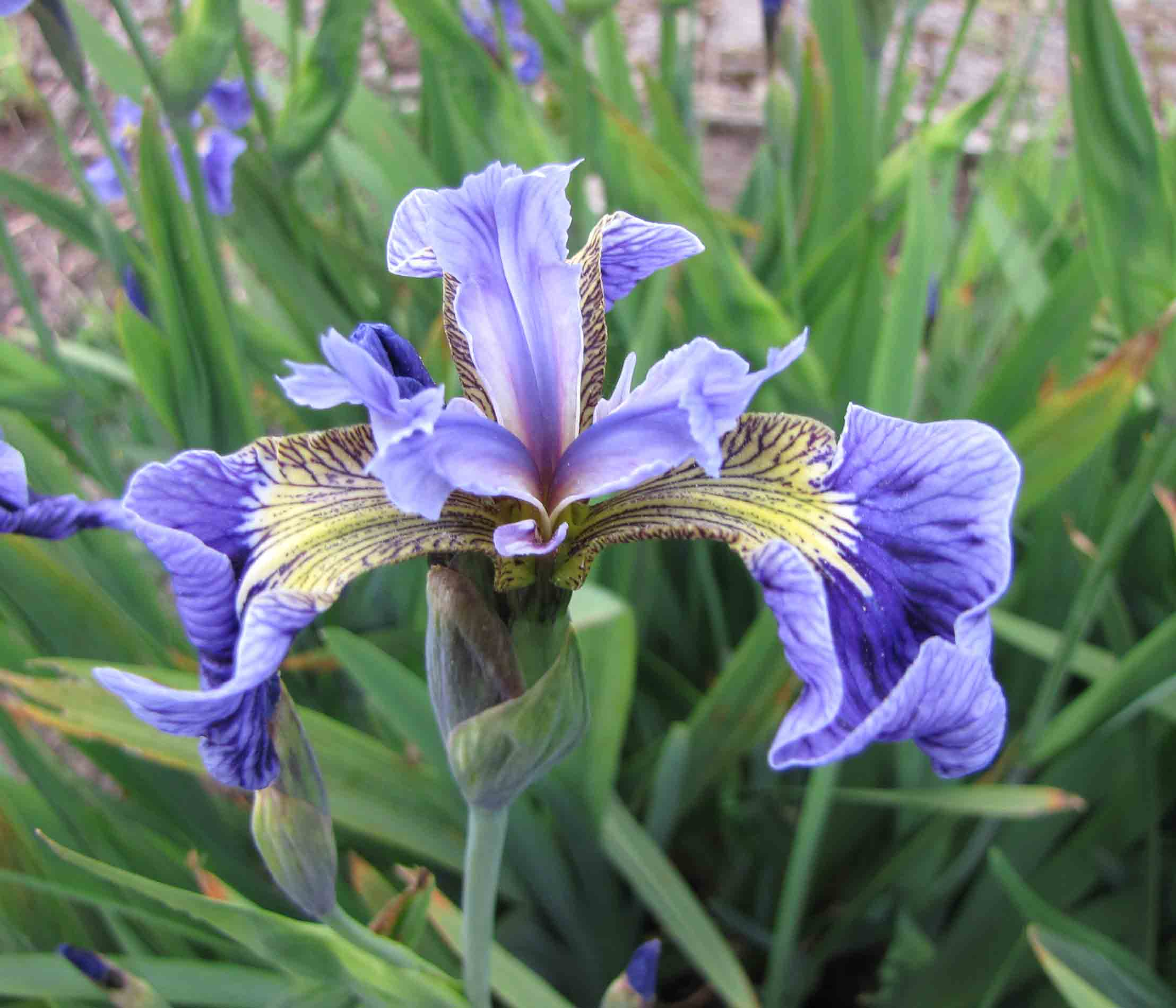
Bristle-pointed beachhead iris Iris setosa (hiougi-ayame, 'cypress fan' iris (檜扇菖蒲)), designated imperial personal emblem of Kiko

Prince Fumihito first proposed marriage to Kiko Kawashima on 26 June 1986 while they were both undergraduates at Gakushuin. Three years later, the Imperial Household Council announced the engagement on 12 September 1989 and the engagement ceremony was held on 12 January 1990. No marriage date would be set until the official one-year mourning period ended for Fumihito's grandfather, Emperor Hirohito, who had died in January 1989.

The wedding took place at an exclusive shrine at Tokyo Imperial Palace on 29 June 1990. The Imperial Household Council had previously granted the prince permission to establish a new branch of the imperial family and the Emperor granted him the title Akishino-no-miya (Prince Akishino) on his wedding day. Upon marriage, his bride became Her Imperial Highness The Princess Akishino, known informally as Princess Kiko. As tradition dictates, upon her entry into the imperial family and like other members, she received a personal emblem (o-shirushi (お印)): the blossom of the bristle-pointed beachhead iris Iris setosa (hiougi-ayame, cypress fan iris (檜扇菖蒲)) which blooms in intense shades of dark lavender to blue.

The engagement and marriage of Prince Akishino to the former Kiko Kawashima broke precedent in several respects. At the time, the groom was still a graduate student at Gakushuin and he would be married before his older brother, Crown Prince Naruhito. Officials at the Imperial Household Agency were opposed to the marriage, and so was Fumihito's paternal grandmother Empress Nagako. As the second woman from a middle-class and academician background to marry into the imperial family after her mother-in-law Empress Michiko, she was given the nickname "the apartment princess" by the media. Although Empress Michiko was also born a commoner, she was from a very wealthy family; her father was the president of a large flour-milling company.

The Princess had said repeatedly that she wanted to finish her master's degree if circumstances permitted. She completed her post-graduate studies in psychology between her official duties and received her master's degree in psychology in 1995. She is known for her continuing interest in deaf culture and the Deaf in Japan. She learned Japanese sign language and is a skilled sign language interpreter. She attends the "Sign Language Speech Contest for High School Students" held every August, and "Praising Mothers Raising Children with Hearing Impairments" every December. In October 2008, she participated in the "38th National Deaf Women's Conference." She also signs in informal Deaf gatherings.

In March 2013, Kiko was granted a Doctor of Philosophy degree in Psychology at the Graduate School of Humanities and Sciences, Ochanomizu University, for her dissertation entitled "Knowledge, perceptions, beliefs and behaviors related to tuberculosis: A study based on questionnaire surveys with seminar participants of the National Federation of Community Women's Organizations for TB Control and female college students."

=== Children ===
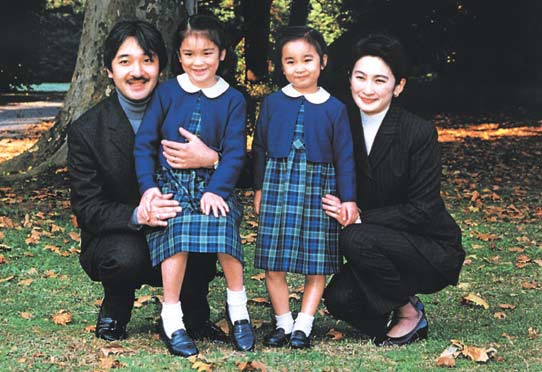
Fumihito and Kiko with their two daughters

Since 1997, Prince Fumihito and Princess Kiko and their children have maintained a principal residence on the grounds of the Akasaka Estate in Motoakasaka, Minato, Tokyo. The couple have three children (two daughters and one son):

- Mako Komuro (小室 眞子, Komuro Mako; born 23 October 1991 at Imperial Household Agency Hospital in Tokyo Imperial Palace); formerly Princess Mako (眞子内親王, Mako Naishinnō); following her civil marriage to lawyer Kei Komuro on 26 October 2021, Mako gave up her imperial title and left the imperial family as required by 1947 Imperial Household Law.
- Princess Kako of Akishino (佳子内親王, Kako Naishinnō; born 29 December 1994 at Imperial Household Agency Hospital in Tokyo Imperial Palace)
- Prince Hisahito of Akishino (悠仁親王, Hisahito Shinnō; born 6 September 2006 at Aiiku Hospital in Tokyo, next in line to the Chrysanthemum Throne after his father)

== Official duties ==
The Prince and Princess are called upon to meet with important overseas visitors to improve diplomatic relations. The Princess was chosen as one of the Young Global Leaders for 2007, drawn from a poll of 4000 candidates.

The Prince and Princess have made numerous official visits to foreign countries. In June 2002, they became the first members of the imperial family to visit Mongolia, in celebration of the 30th anniversary of diplomatic relations. In October 2002, they visited the Netherlands to attend the funeral of Prince Claus of the Netherlands. In September 2003, the Prince and Princess made goodwill visits to Fiji, Tonga and Samoa, again, the first time ever members of the imperial family had visited these countries. In March 2004, the Prince and Princess returned to the Netherlands for the funeral of Queen Juliana of the Netherlands. In January 2005, they visited Luxembourg to attend the funeral of Grand Duchess Joséphine-Charlotte. From October to November 2006, they visited Paraguay to commemorate the 70th anniversary of Japanese emigration to that country. In January 2008, they visited Indonesia for a ceremony commemorating the 50th anniversary of the establishment of diplomatic relations between Japan and Indonesia.

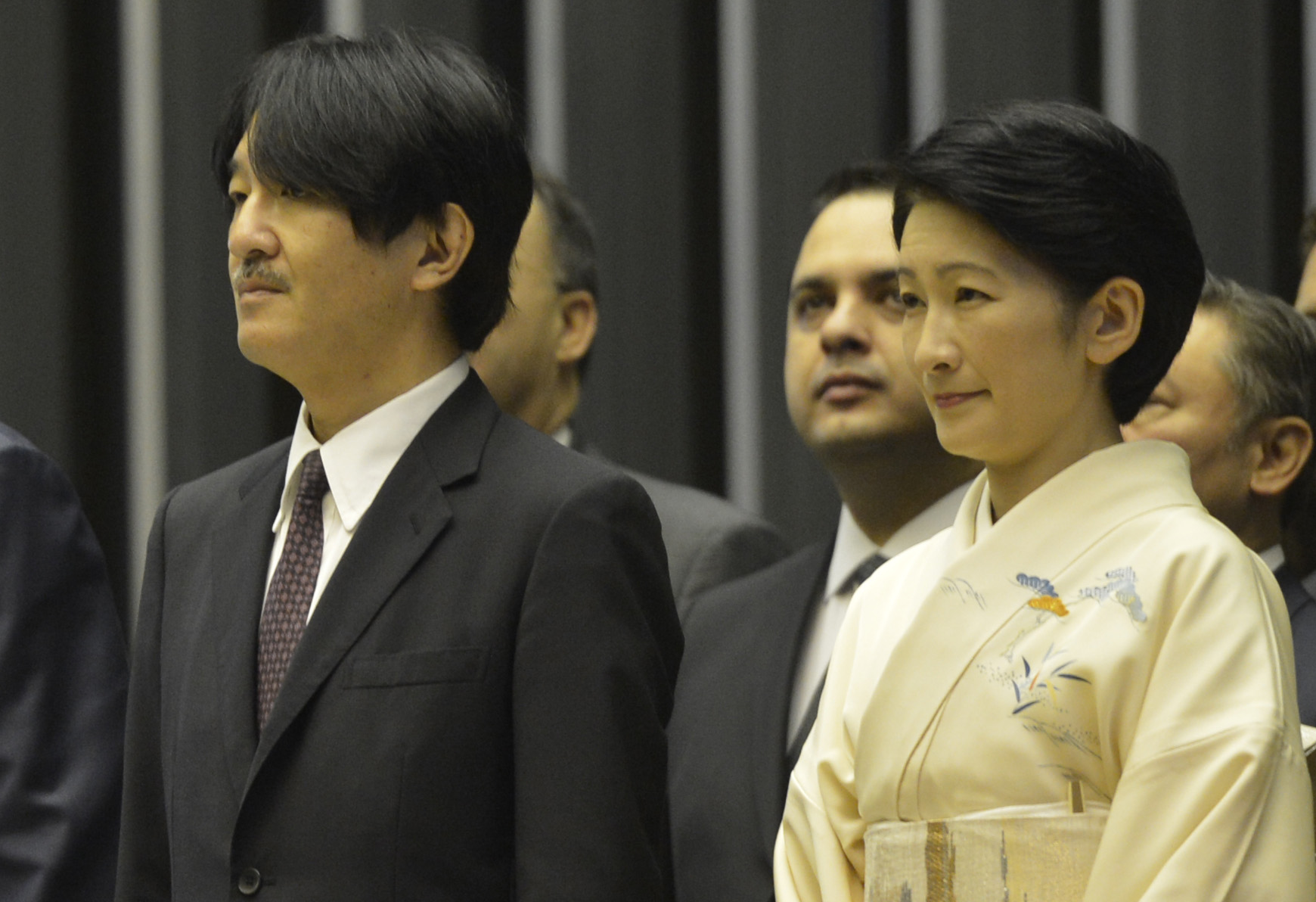
Prince Fumihito and Princess Kiko observe National Congress of Brazil, 2015

They visited Austria, Bulgaria, Hungary, and Romania in May 2009 on the occasion of "Japan-Danube Friendship Year 2009" and the Netherlands in August 2009 for the commemorative event of the 400th anniversary of the trade relations between Japan and the Netherlands. They have visited Costa Rica, Uganda, Croatia, the Slovakia, Slovenia, Peru, and Argentina. From June to July 2014, Prince Fumihito and Princess Kiko visited Zambia and Tanzania.

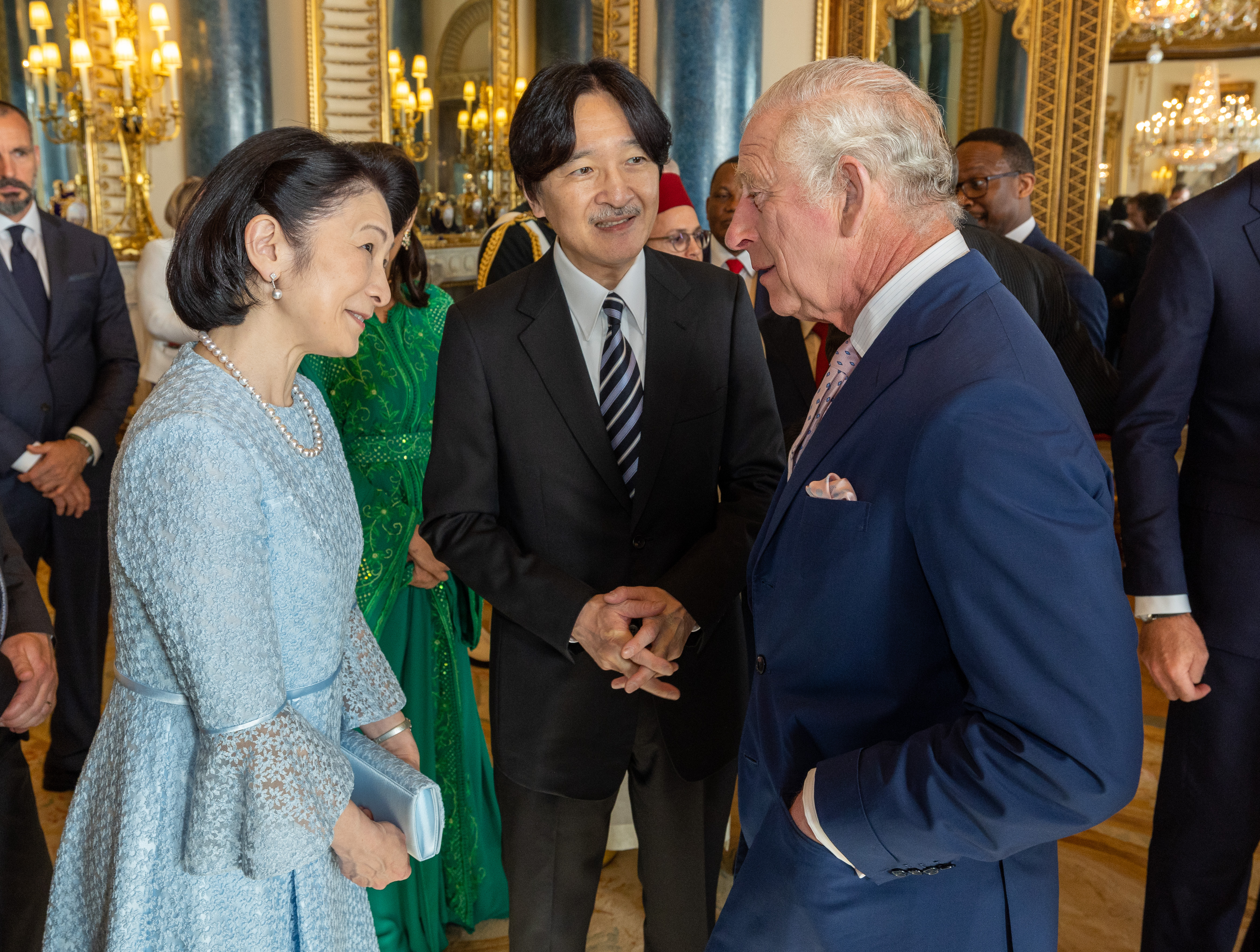
The Crown Prince and Princess with King Charles III at Buckingham Palace, 2023

In June–July 2019, the couple carried out the first official overseas visit by the imperial family following the accession of Emperor Naruhito. They visited Poland and Finland to participate in the celebrations for the 100th anniversary of the establishment of diplomatic relationship between Japan and the two countries. In August 2019, the couple and their son, Hisahito, arrived in Bhutan for a visit. In 2023 they were guests at the coronation of King Charles III and Queen Camilla.

In August 2026 they visited Paraguay to commemorate the 70th anniversary of Japanese emigration to that country.

In September 2026, they visited Norway to attend the state funeral of King Harald V.

== Health ==
While pregnant with her third child, Kiko was diagnosed with placenta praevia. The Princess also had carpal tunnel syndrome osteoporosis aggravated by child-nursing, a symptom common among middle-aged women, her doctor revealed on 14 December 2007.

In late 2023 it was reported that Kiko was suffering from a gastrointestinal illness which prevented her from eating "normal meals" though an endoscopy performed on her in January 2024 found no abnormalities.

== Honours ==
Mon of the Akishino branch of the imperial family

=== National ===
- Japan:
  - Grand Cordon (Paulownia) of the Order of the Precious Crown
  - Dame of the Decoration of the Red Cross
  - Recipient of the Red Cross Medal

=== Foreign ===
- Belgium: Grand Cross of the Order of the Crown (11 October 2016)
- Netherlands: Grand Cross of the Order of the Crown (24 October 2014)
- Peru: Grand Cross of the Order of the Sun (27 January 2014)
- Spain: Dame Grand Cross of the Order of Isabella the Catholic (8 November 2008)

=== Honorary positions ===
- Reserve Member of the Imperial House Council
- Patroness of the Japan Anti-Tuberculosis Association
- President of the Imperial Gift Foundation Boshi-Aiiku-kai
- Honorary Patroness of the Society for the Protection of the Cultural Heritage of Daishoji Imperial Convent
- Honorary Vice-president of the Japanese Red Cross Society
- Honorary Research Fellow of the Japan Society for the Promotion of Science
- Honorary Research Fellow of the Ochanomizu University Institute for Education and Human Development

== See also ==
- Japanese imperial succession debate
- Emperor of Japan: Succession
