= Fumihito, Crown Prince of Japan =

Heir presumptive to the Japanese throne (born 1965)

Fumihito
- Crown Prince Akishino
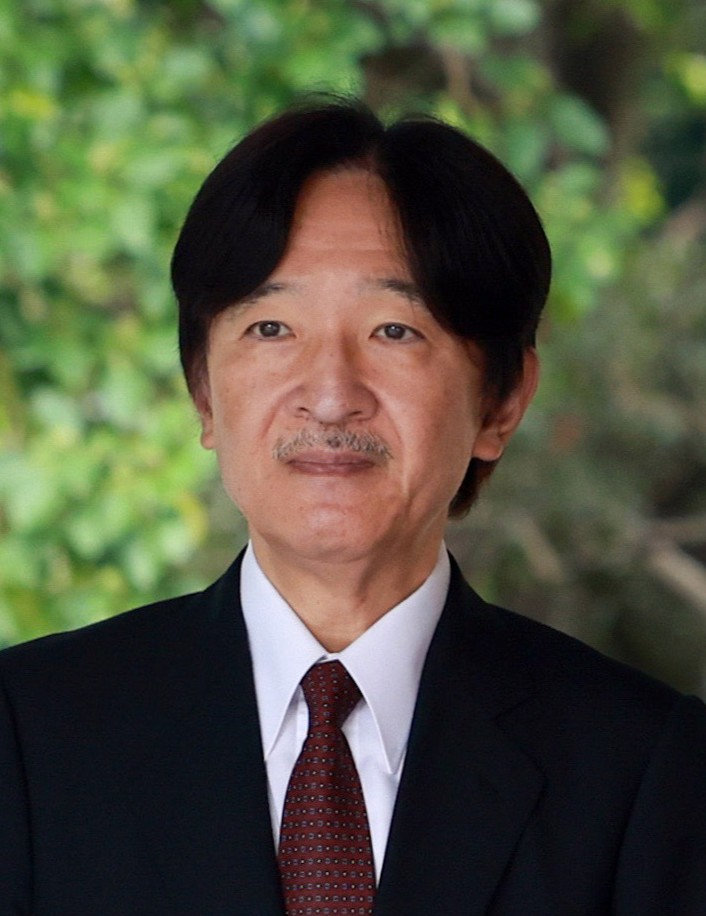
- Fumihito in 2025
- Born: Fumihito, Prince Aya (礼宮文仁親王); 30 November 1965 (age 60); Imperial Palace, Tokyo, Japan
- Spouse: Kiko Kawashima (m. 1990)
- Issue: Mako Komuro; Princess Kako of Akishino; Prince Hisahito of Akishino
- House: Imperial House of Japan
- Father: Akihito
- Mother: Michiko Shōda
- Religion: Shinto
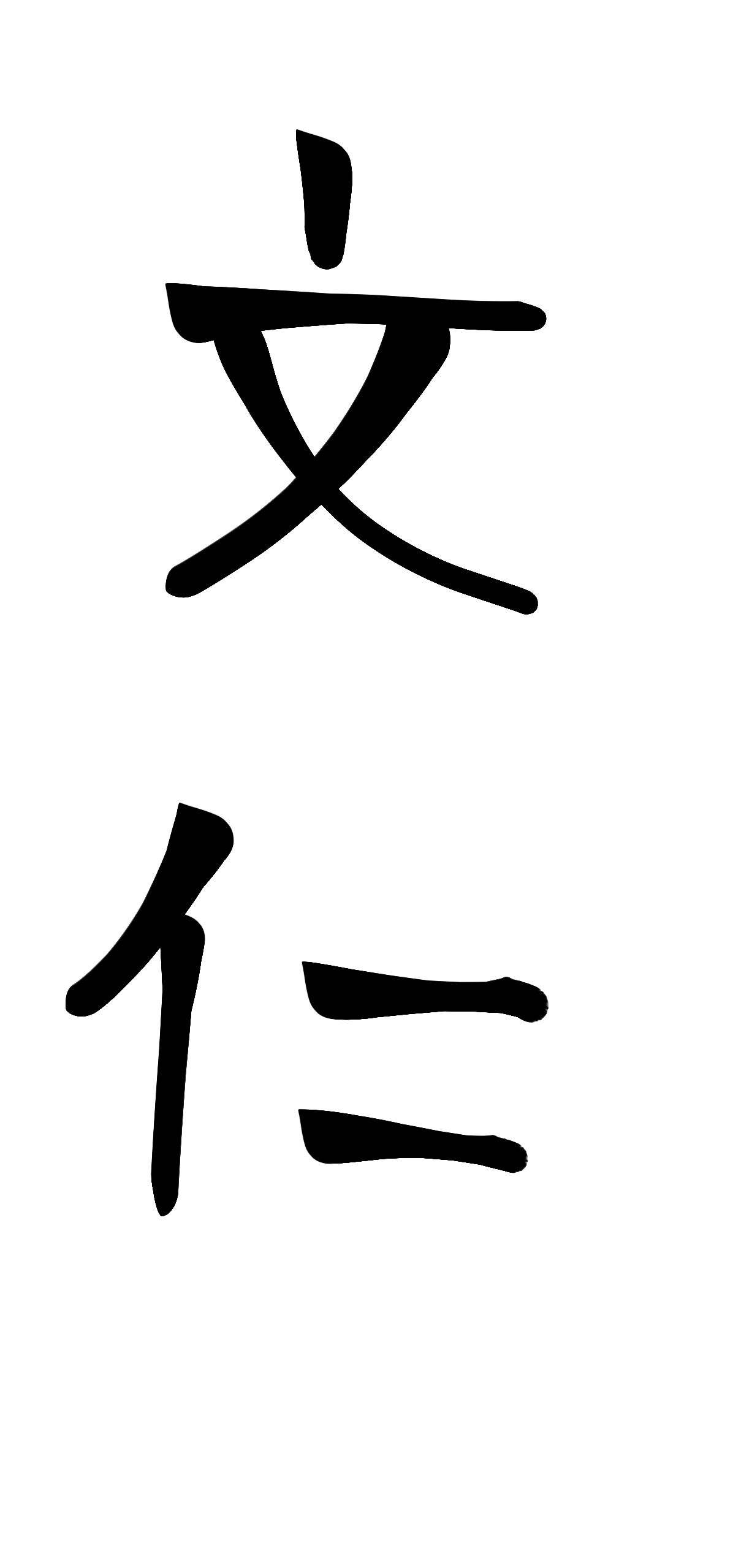
- Signature

Fumihito, Crown Prince Akishino (秋篠宮皇嗣文仁親王, Akishino-no-miya Kōshi Fumihito Shinnō; born 30 November 1965, Japanese: [ɸɯ̟mʲiꜜçi̥to̞]) is the heir presumptive to the Japanese throne. He is the younger brother of Emperor Naruhito, and the younger son of Emperor Emeritus Akihito and Empress Emerita Michiko. Since his marriage in June 1990, he has had the title Prince Akishino (秋篠宮, Akishino-no-miya) and has headed the Akishino branch of the Imperial House of Japan.

Fumihito has a bachelor's degree in political science from Gakushuin University and a Doctor of Philosophy degree in ornithology from the Graduate University for Advanced Studies. In 1990, he married Kiko Kawashima, with whom he has three children: Mako, Kako, and Hisahito. In November 2020, Fumihito was officially declared the heir presumptive to the throne, during the Ceremony for Proclamation of Crown Prince (Rikkōshi-Senmei-no-gi) in Tokyo. Preceding his investiture as Crown Prince, the ongoing Japanese imperial succession debate had resulted in some politicians holding a favorable view on rescinding agnatic primogeniture, which was implemented in 1889. However, once Fumihito and Kiko had their son Hisahito in September 2006, he became next in the line of succession following his father. Fumihito's niece and Emperor Naruhito's only child, Princess Aiko, remains at present legally ineligible to inherit the throne, while debate about the possibility of having future empresses regnant continues.

As active working members of the imperial family, Fumihito and his wife Kiko's schedule includes attending summits, and organisational and global event meetings. The couple have particularly represented the Japanese imperial house in ceremonies involving heads of state and VIPs abroad.

== Early life and education ==
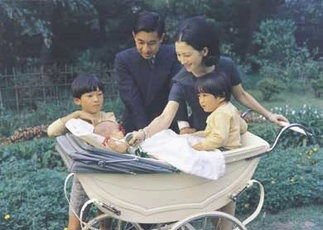
Prince Fumihito (right) with his parents and siblings

The prince was born on 30 November 1965 at 12:22 am in the Imperial Household Agency Hospital, Tokyo Imperial Palace. His given name is Fumihito. His mother, Empress Emerita Michiko, is a convert to Shinto from Roman Catholicism. His childhood appellation was Prince Aya (礼宮, Aya-no-miya). He attended the kindergarten, primary and secondary schools of the Gakushūin. He played tennis in primary and secondary schools of the Gakushūin.

In April 1984, the prince entered the Law Department of Gakushuin University, where he studied law and biological science. After graduating from the university with a bachelor's degree in Political Science, he studied the taxonomy of fish at St John's College, Oxford in the United Kingdom from October 1988 to June 1990. According to British government documents released by the National Archives, Fumihito's requests to follow in his elder brother's footsteps and study in Britain were initially turned down by the Imperial Household Agency.

Upon the death of his grandfather Emperor Shōwa (Hirohito) on 7 January 1989, the prince became second-in-line to the throne after his elder brother, Crown Prince Naruhito.

The prince received a PhD degree in ornithology from the Graduate University for Advanced Studies in October 1996. His doctoral dissertation was titled, "Molecular Phylogeny of Jungle Fowls, genus Gallus and Monophyletic Origin of Domestic Fowls". He conducted field research in Indonesia in 1993 and 1994, and in Yunnan Province in the People's Republic of China. When the Emperor Emeritus was then Crown Prince, he introduced tilapia to Thailand as an important source of protein. Tilapia can be easily cultured and Prince Fumihito, who is also known as a "catfish specialist", has managed to maintain and expand the aquacultural studies with the people of Thailand. The prince has worked as a researcher at the University Museum at the University of Tokyo where he also is an Honorary Fellow.

Prior to Fumihito's birth, the announcement of the then-Crown Prince Akihito's engagement and marriage to the then-Ms. Michiko Shōda had drawn opposition from traditionalist groups, because Shōda came from a Roman Catholic family. Although Shōda was never baptised, she was educated in Catholic schools and seemed to share the faith of her parents. Rumours also speculated the then-Empress Kōjun had opposed the engagement.

== Marriage and children ==
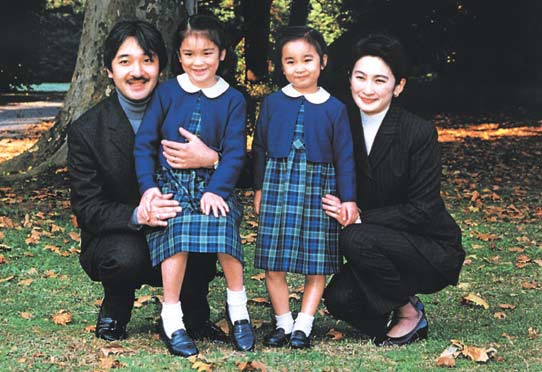
Fumihito and Kiko with their two daughters

On 29 June 1990, Fumihito married Kiko Kawashima, the daughter of Tatsuhiko Kawashima (professor of economics at Gakushuin University) and his wife, Kazuyo.

The couple met when they were both undergraduates at Gakushuin University. Like his father, the emperor emeritus, the prince married outside the former aristocracy and former collateral branches of the imperial family. Upon marriage, he received the title Prince Akishino (Akishino-no-miya – strictly "Prince Akishino") and authorisation from the Imperial Household Economy Council to form a new branch of the Imperial Family. The marriage was bitterly resented by officials at the Imperial Household Agency, who had desired that the Prince should adhere to tradition and not marry before his elder brother.

=== Children ===
Crown Prince and Crown Princess Akishino have two daughters and one son:

- Mako Komuro (小室 眞子, Komuro Mako; born 23 October 1991 at Imperial Household Agency Hospital in Tokyo Imperial Palace); formerly Princess Mako (眞子内親王, Mako Naishinnō); following her civil marriage to Kei Komuro on 26 October 2021, Mako gave up her imperial title and left the Imperial Family as required by 1947 Imperial Household Law.
- Princess Kako of Akishino (佳子内親王, Kako Naishinnō; born 29 December 1994 at Imperial Household Agency Hospital in Tokyo Imperial Palace)
- Prince Hisahito of Akishino (悠仁親王, Hisahito Shinnō; born 6 September 2006 at Aiiku Hospital in Tokyo)

== Functions ==
Fumihito serves as the president of the Yamashina Institute for Ornithology and the Japanese Association of Zoological Gardens and Aquariums. He is also the honorary president of the World Wide Fund for Nature Japan, the Japan Tennis Association, and the Japan-Netherlands Association.

The prince and princess have made numerous official visits to foreign countries. In June 2002, they became the first members of the Imperial Family to visit Mongolia, in celebration of the 30th anniversary of diplomatic relations. In October 2002, they visited the Netherlands to attend the funeral of Prince Claus of the Netherlands. In September 2003, they made goodwill visits to Fiji, Tonga and Samoa, again, the first time ever members of the Imperial Family had visited these countries. In March 2004, the prince and princess returned to the Netherlands for the funeral of Queen Juliana of the Netherlands. In January 2005, they visited Luxembourg to attend the funeral of Grand Duchess Joséphine-Charlotte. From October to November 2006, they visited Paraguay to commemorate the 70th anniversary of Japanese emigration to that country. In January 2008, they visited Indonesia for a ceremony commemorating the 50th anniversary of the establishment of diplomatic relations between Japan and the Republic of Indonesia.

The prince and princess visited Austria, Bulgaria, Hungary, and Romania in May 2009 on the occasion of "Japan-Danube Friendship Year 2009" and the Netherlands in August 2009 for the commemorative event of the 400th anniversary of the trade relations between Japan and the Netherlands. They have also visited Costa Rica, Uganda, Croatia, the Slovak Republic, Slovenia, Peru, and Argentina.

In addition, Fumihito carried out public duties on behalf of the Emperor when he was hospitalised. He and other members of the imperial family visited the affected areas after the Great East Japan earthquake in March 2011. From June to July 2014, Prince Fumihito and Princess Kiko visited Republic of Zambia and United Republic of Tanzania.

In accordance with legislation passed allowing his father's abdication, he became heir presumptive to the throne on 30 April 2019. Once plans were announced for the impending abdication and his brother's enthronement, Fumihito suggested that instead of using public money the imperial family should pay for the religious rituals in the enthronement as the constitution separates religion and state, despite the government agreeing to foot the bill. In June–July 2019, the Crown Prince and his wife carried out the first official overseas visit by the imperial family following the accession of Emperor Naruhito. They visited Poland and Finland to participate in the celebrations for the 100th anniversary of establishment of diplomatic relationship between Japan and the two countries. In August 2019, the couple and their son, Hisahito, arrived in Bhutan for a visit.

The public proclamation of Fumihito as Crown Prince did not take place on 19 April 2020 due to the COVID-19 pandemic. His accession as crown prince took place privately. On 8 November 2020, Fumihito was formally declared first-in-line to the Chrysanthemum Throne. During the ceremony he said "I will carry out my duties by deeply acknowledging my responsibilities as crown prince".

His older brother during his time as Crown Prince carried the title Kōtaishi (皇太子, Crown Prince; lit. 'Great Imperial Son'), and was also referred by the Japanese press with this title until his accession to the throne. However Prince Akishino did not receive the title Kōtaishi as heir to the throne, apparently due to personal reluctance as not being raised as crown prince unlike his older brother, and chose the title Kōshi (皇嗣; lit. 'Imperial Heir') instead.

== Titles and honours ==
Mon of the Akishino branch of the imperial family

=== Titles and styles ===
- 30 November 1965 – 28 June 1990: His Imperial Highness Prince Aya
- 29 June 1990 – 30 April 2019: His Imperial Highness Prince Akishino
- 1 May 2019 – present: His Imperial Highness Crown Prince Akishino

=== Honours ===
- Italy: Knight Grand Cross of the Order of Merit of the Italian Republic
- Netherlands: Grand Cross of the Order of the Crown
- Peru: Grand Cross of the Order of the Sun
- Spain: Knight Grand Cross of the Order of Isabella the Catholic
- Paraguay: Grand Cross of the National Order of Merit

=== Honorary degrees ===
- Doctor of Fishery Biology (Kasetsart University, 1995)
- Doctor of Science (Burapha University, 1995)
- Doctor of Fisheries (Khon Kaen University, 1999)
- Doctor of Science (Srinakharinwirot University, 2001)
- Doctor of Science (Chulalongkorn University, 2001)
- Doctor of Agriculture (Ubon Ratchathani University, 2003)
- Doctor of Fisheries Science (King Mongkut's Institute of Technology Ladkrabang, 2007)
- Doctor of Animal Science (Kasetsart University, 2011)
- Doctor of Human and Environment Management (Chiang Mai University, 2011)
- Doctor of Science (Agricultural Technology) (Thammasat University, 2012)
- Doctor of Biology (Mahasarakham University, 2018)

=== Honorary positions ===
- Member of the Imperial House Council
- President of Yamashina Institute for Ornithology
- President of Japanese Association of Zoos and Aquariums
- Patron of the Society for the Protection of Mitera Sennyuji
- Patron of the Social Welfare Organization "Saiseikai" Imperial Gift Foundation Inc.
- Patron of the Agricultural Society of Japan
- Patron of the Japan Forestry Association
- Patron of the Japan Association of Botanical Gardens
- Patron of the Foundation for Academic Specimens of Domesticated Animals
- Honorary President of World Wide Fund for Nature Japan
- Honorary Patron of the Japan-Netherlands Society
- Honorary Patron of Association for All Nippon Gourd Fanciers
- Honorary President of Japan Water Prize Committee
- Honorary President of the Waksman Foundation of Japan INC
- Honorary Vice President of the Siam Society
- Researcher Extraordinary of the University Museum, the University of Tokyo
- Guest professor of Tokyo University of Agriculture
- Honorary Associate of the Australian Museum

Fumihito, Crown Prince of Japan Imperial House of Japan Born: 30 November 1965
Lines of succession
First	Succession to the Japanese throne 1st in line	Succeeded by Prince Hisahito of Akishino
