= Princess Kako of Akishino =

Japanese princess (born 1994)

Kako
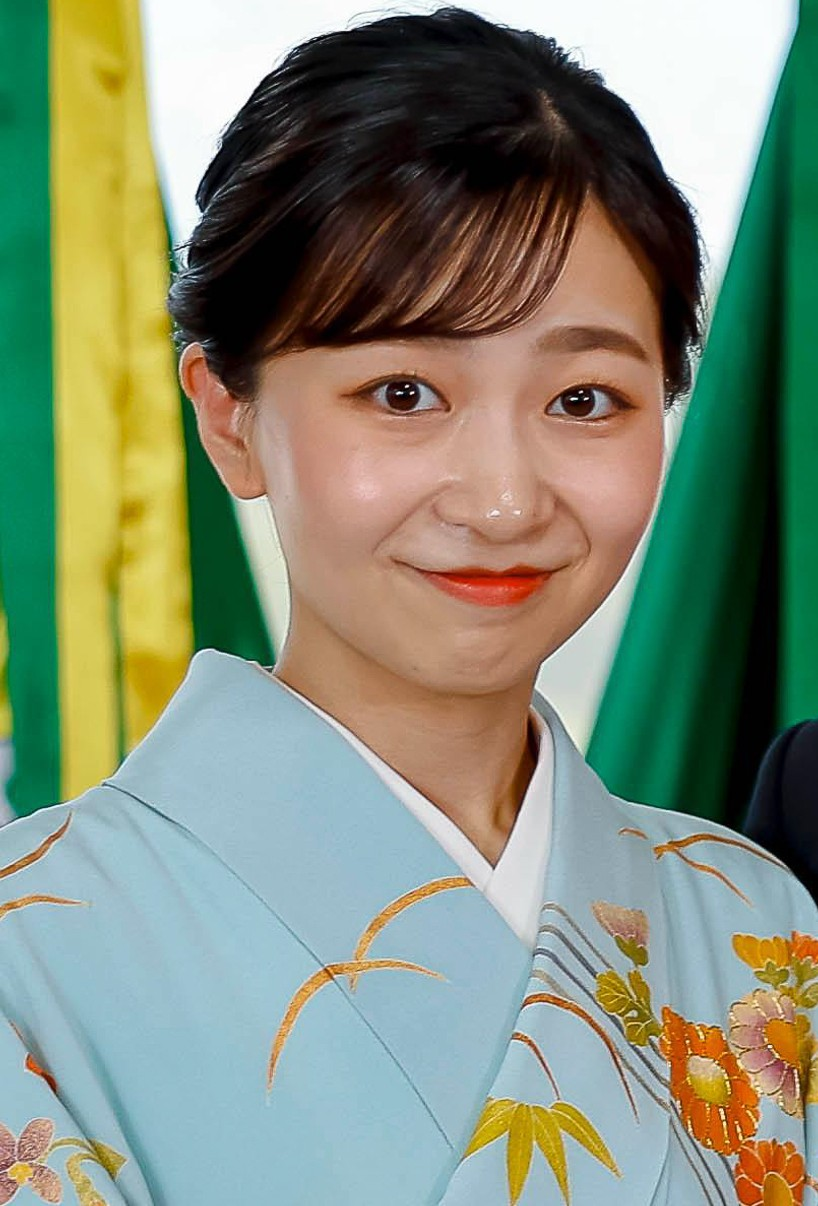
- Princess Kako in June 2025
- Born: 29 December 1994 (age 31); Imperial Palace, Tokyo, Japan
- House: Imperial House of Japan
- Father: Fumihito, Crown Prince of Japan
- Mother: Kiko Kawashima

Princess Kako of Akishino (佳子内親王, Kako Naishinnō; born 29 December 1994) is the second daughter of the Crown Prince and Crown Princess of Japan and a member of the Akishino branch of the Japanese imperial family. She is a niece of Emperor Naruhito and the second-eldest grandchild of Emperor Emeritus Akihito and Empress Emerita Michiko.

== Biography ==
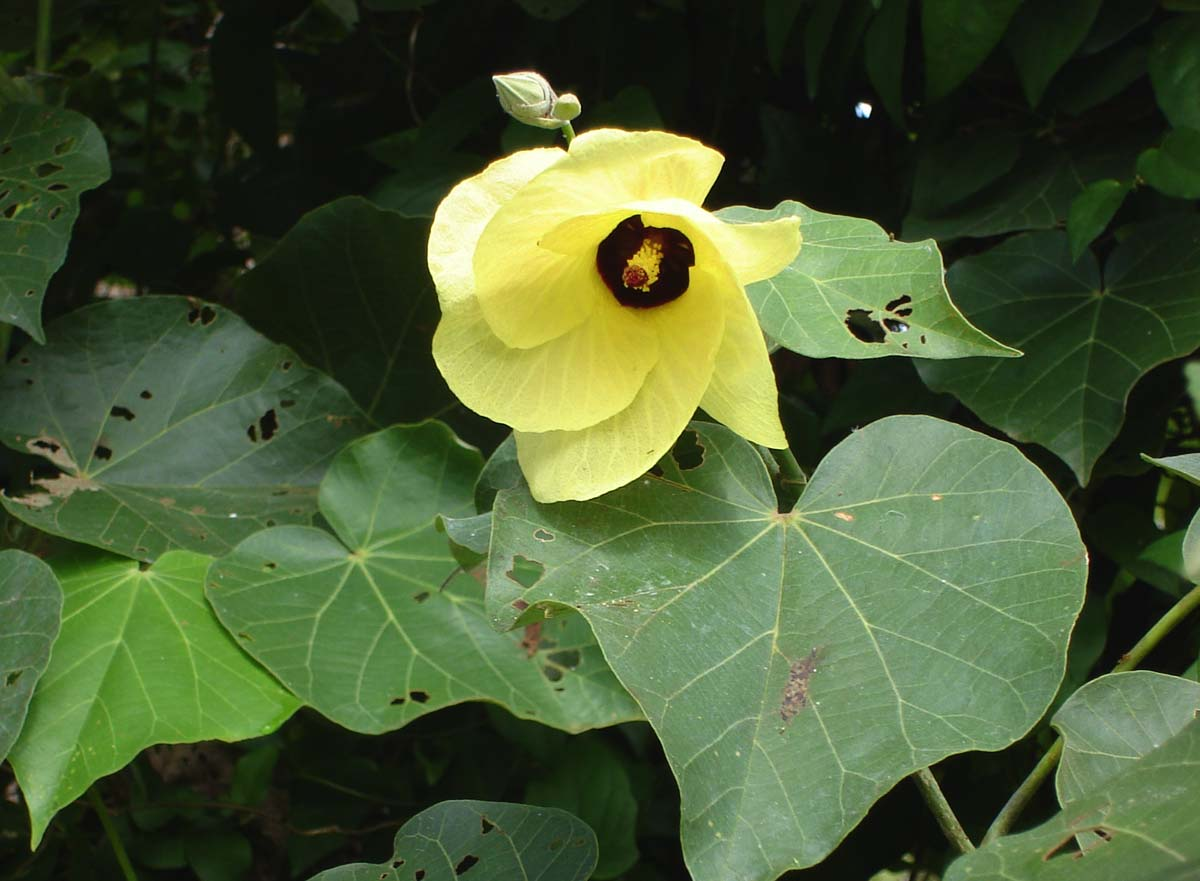
Sea hibiscus, Hibiscus tiliaceus, designated personal imperial emblem of Kako

Princess Kako was born on 29 December 1994 at Imperial Household Agency Hospital in Tokyo Imperial Palace, Chiyoda, Tokyo. She has an older sister, Mako Komuro, and a younger brother, Prince Hisahito.

In April 1999, she began Gakushuin Kindergarten and graduated in March 2001. Afterwards, Princess Kako entered Gakushuin Primary School in April 2001 and graduated in March 2007. She entered Gakushuin Girls' Junior High School in April 2007 and graduated in March 2010. In April 2010, she enrolled into Gakushuin Girls’ Senior High School, graduating in March 2013.

=== Figure skating ===
She participated in figure skating while in primary school. In 2007, she represented the Meiji-jingu Gaien Figure Skating Club and joined the Spring Cup Figure Skating Competition held by the Japan Skating Federation. Princess Kako ranked top in the Shinjuku division (Female Group B - Primary School Year Six or above).

=== Higher education ===
In April 2013, she attended the entrance ceremony of Gakushuin University and began her life as an undergraduate student. In August 2014, she quit the Department of Education, the Faculty of Letters, Gakushuin University and passed the entrance examination to the International Christian University (ICU), her older sister's alma mater. On 2 April 2015, the Princess attended the entrance ceremony of the university in Tokyo.

In 2017, as part of the ICU's study abroad programme, Princess Kako travelled to the United Kingdom to study at the University of Leeds. She studied performance design and stage management as part of the programme. She completed her studies in June 2018.

In 2019 she graduated from the Division of Arts and Sciences, College of Liberal Arts, in the International Christian University.

== Official duties ==
From 7 to 21 August 2003, Kako went to Thailand with her parents and sister for the 71st birthday celebration of Queen Sirikit and for conferment of an honorary fellowship from Ubon Ratchathani University, and for joint research on poultry.

In September 2019, she embarked on her first official solo overseas visit and went to Austria and Hungary, where she met with the heads of state of those countries.

In May 2021, she began working part-time for the Japanese Federation of the Deaf. Kako is an honorary patron of the Japan Tennis Association and a patron of the Japan Kōgei Association. Both positions were previously held by her sister Princess Mako, who left the imperial family upon her marriage in October 2021.

=== Health ===
In November 2025, Kako tested positive for COVID-19 and had to cancel her visit to the Deaflympics Square, the main venue for the 2025 Deaflympics, in Tokyo.

=== Official visits ===
- September 2019 – Austria and Hungary
- November 2023 – Peru
- May 2024 – Greece
- June 2025 – Brazil

== Title, style and honours ==
=== Title and style ===
- 29 December 1994 – present: Her Imperial Highness Princess Kako (佳子内親王殿下, Kako naishinnō denka)

Mon of the Akishino branch of the imperial family

=== Honours ===
==== National honours ====
- Japan: Grand Cordon of the Order of the Precious Crown (29 December 2014)

==== Foreign honours ====
- Brazil: Grand Cross of the Order of Ipiranga (9 June 2025)
