= Prince Hisahito of Akishino =

Japanese prince (born 2006)

Hisahito: 悠仁
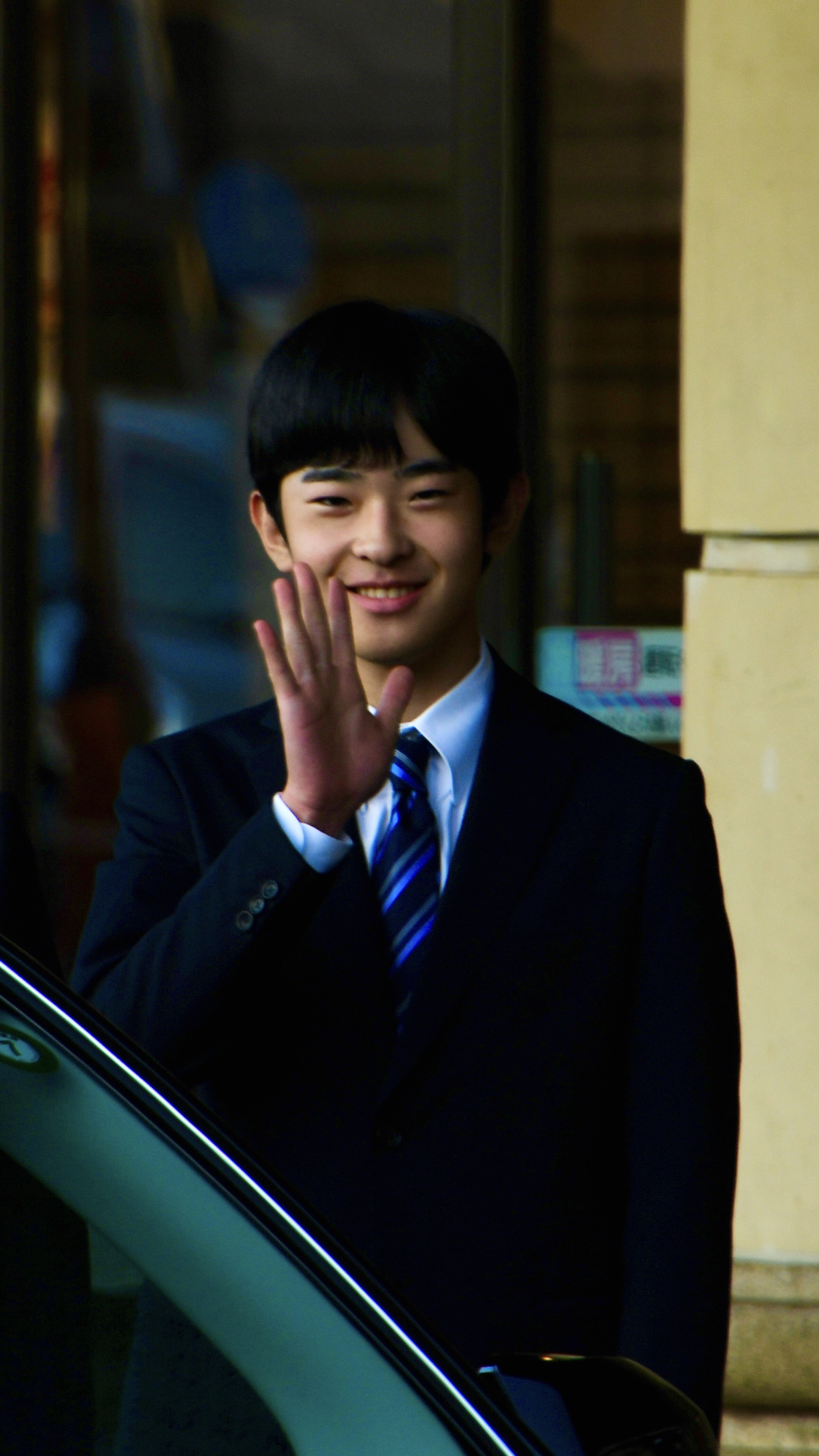
- Hisahito in 2025
- Born: 6 September 2006 (age 20); Minato, Tokyo, Japan
- House: Imperial House of Japan
- Father: Fumihito, Crown Prince of Japan
- Mother: Kiko Kawashima

Prince Hisahito of Akishino (悠仁親王, Hisahito Shinnō; born 6 September 2006) is a member of the Imperial House of Japan. He is the youngest child and only son of Crown Prince Fumihito and Crown Princess Kiko, and the nephew of Emperor Naruhito. He is second in the line of succession to the Japanese throne behind his father.

Preceding his birth, the paucity of male heirs in the imperial family had triggered the Japanese imperial succession debate, with some politicians favoring the abandonment of agnatic primogeniture which has prevailed in Japan since its monarchy was established, with eight exceptions (the last reigning empress being Go-Sakuramachi, r. 1762–1771), and which remains the law of imperial succession under the post-World War II constitution of Japan. The birth of Hisahito in 2006 removed the need to make any non-traditional provision for the succession. He became, at birth, next in the line of succession after his uncle and father.

== Early life ==
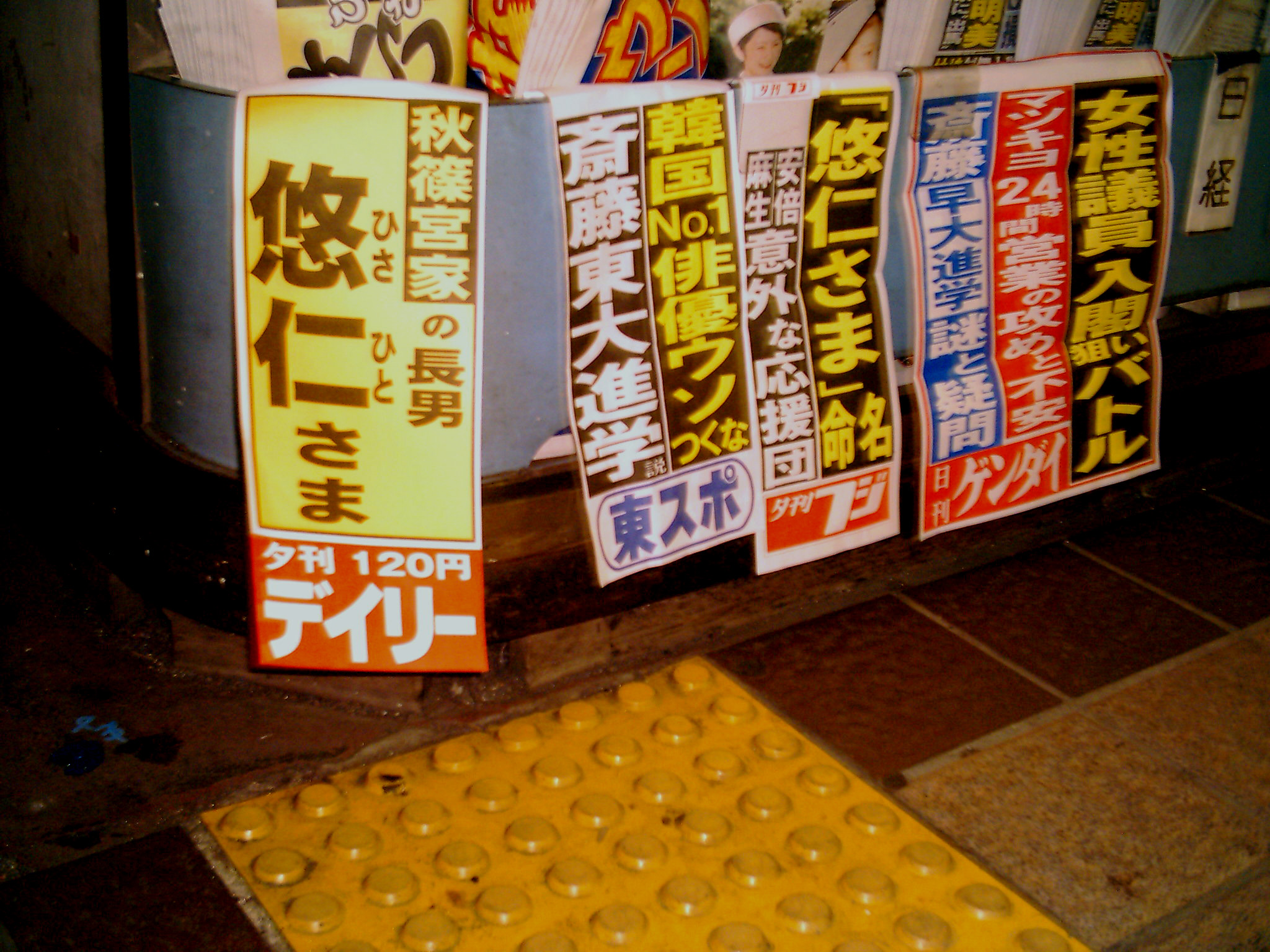
Japanese tabloids announcing the birth of Hisahito, then third in line for the Chrysanthemum Throne

Prince Hisahito was born at 08:27 JST on 6 September 2006 (23:27 on 5 September UTC) at Aiiku Hospital in Minato, Tokyo. He was delivered by Caesarean section, two weeks early, after complications in the pregnancy.

Hisahito is the youngest of three children and only son of Fumihito, Prince Akishino, and Kiko, Princess Akishino. He has two older sisters, Mako Komuro and Princess Kako of Akishino. He was first seen in public on 15 September 2006, outside Aiiku Hospital.

"Hisahito", the Prince's personal name, chosen by his father, means "serene and virtuous", according to the Imperial Household Agency. An alternative translation is "virtuous, calm, everlasting".

Hisahito was the first male child born to the Imperial House of Japan since his father's birth in 1965. In January 2007, Prime Minister Shinzo Abe announced that he would drop an earlier proposal to alter the Imperial Household Law so as to allow women to inherit the throne. The proposal had been made on the basis of the fact that the brother and two sons of Emperor Akihito had, at the time, no sons of their own. Given Hisahito's birth, it now seems increasingly unlikely that the laws will be changed to allow Hisahito's cousin Princess Aiko, daughter of Emperor Naruhito, to become a reigning empress. The supporters of changes criticized the current law as it placed a burden on the few aging males old enough to perform royal duties as females left the family.

== Education ==
In April 2010, Hisahito began kindergarten at Ochanomizu University's kindergarten in Tokyo; on 14 December 2012, the Imperial Household Agency announced he would enter Ochanomizu University Elementary School in April 2013 so he could be with many of his friends from kindergarten. The prince thus became the first member of the Imperial House of Japan to receive his education at a national school other than Gakushūin Primary School, which is also in Tokyo. By his second year, he was reported to be doing well at school, helping to look after first-year pupils and playing with his friends. In April 2019, Hisahito was enrolled in Ochanomizu University Junior High School. Police reports indicate that there was an assassination attempt on him there in May 2019.

In August 2019, Hisahito accompanied his parents on an official visit to Bhutan.

In March 2021, Hisahito was awarded a second-place prize in the junior high student category of Kitakyushu's 12th Children's Nonfiction Literature Awards. In February 2022, he was accused of plagiarism concerning that award-winning essay, which was about his trip to the Ogasawara Islands. The Imperial Household Agency and Hisahito acknowledged that the essay's citations were "inadequate" and that the prince would contact the organizers of the award with revisions. The award was not considered for revocation.

In April 2022, Hisahito was enrolled in University of Tsukuba Senior High School. In April 2025, Hisahito enrolled at the School of Life and Environmental Sciences of the University of Tsukuba.

== Adulthood ==
Hisahito underwent the elaborate Japanese court rituals to recognize him as an adult man on 6 September 2025. He was supposed to undergo the ceremonies in 2024, but he chose to delay them by a year so he could focus on studying for his university entrance exams. In a piece reporting on these ceremonies, the Associated Press stated that "He may be the last emperor" noting that besides Hisahito and his father, the only other potential heir to the throne is the 90-year-old Masahito, Prince Hitachi, and that unless Hisahito quickly has sons of his own, the Japanese monarchy must either reform itself to include the potential of a female heir, or die off.

== Honours ==
The mon of the Akishino branch of the imperial family represents the Japanese umbrella-pine tree (kōyamaki).

- Japan Grand Cordon of the Order of the Chrysanthemum (6 September 2025)

Prince Hisahito of Akishino Imperial House of Japan Born: 6 September 2006
Lines of succession
Preceded by Prince Akishino	Succession to the Japanese throne 2nd in line	Succeeded by Prince Hitachi
