= Mako Komuro =

Former Japanese princess (born 1991)

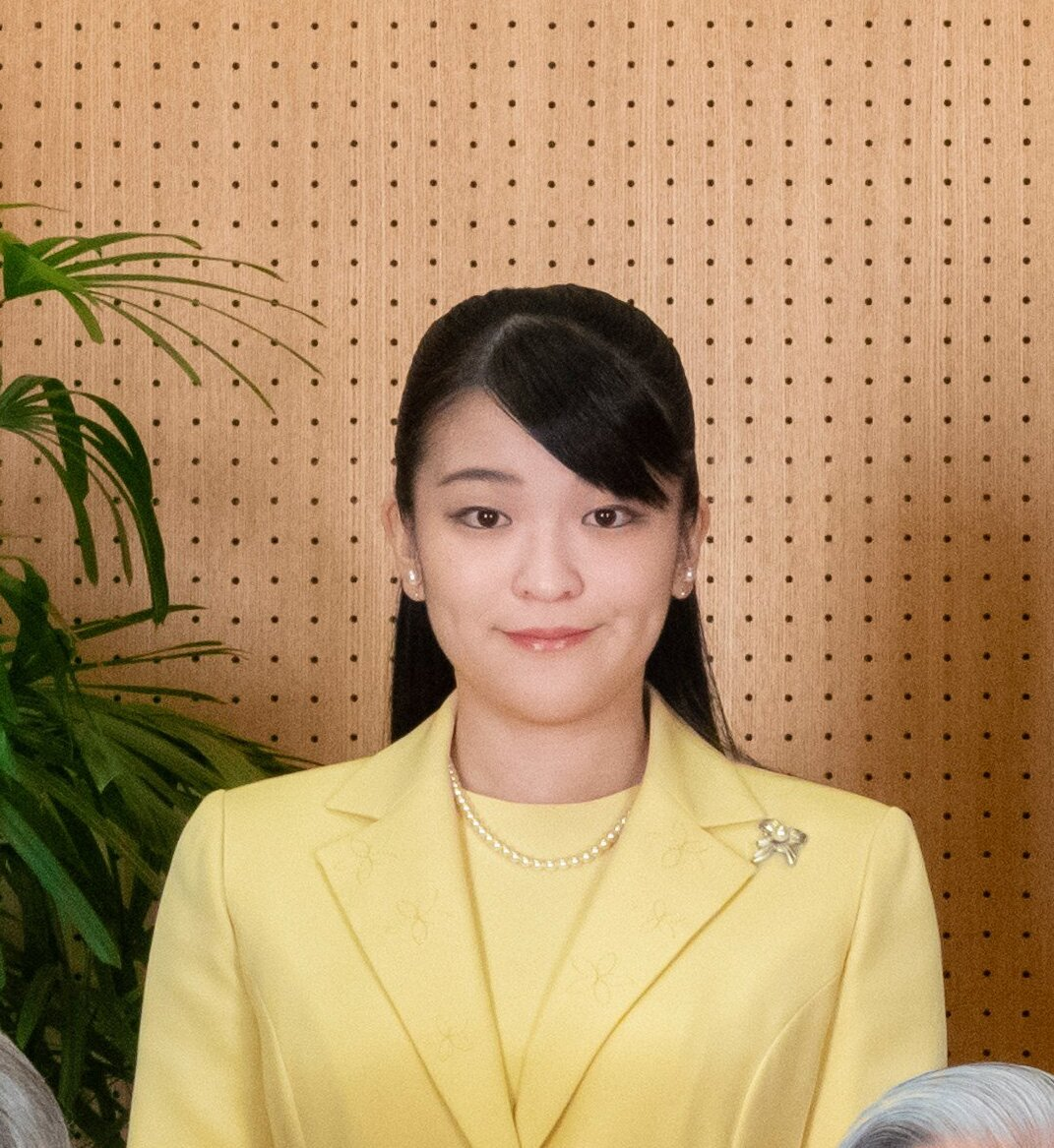
- Mako in 2021
- Born: Princess Mako of Akishino (眞子内親王); 23 October 1991 (age 35); Imperial Palace, Tokyo, Japan
- Occupation: Researcher at The University Museum, The University of Tokyo (formerly)
- Spouse: Kei Komuro (m. 2021)
- Children: 1
- Parents: Fumihito, Crown Prince of Japan (father); Kiko Kawashima (mother)
- Relatives: Imperial House of Japan

Mako Komuro (小室 眞子, Komuro Mako; born 23 October 1991), formerly Princess Mako of Akishino (眞子内親王, Mako Naishinnō), is a Japanese art historian and a former member of the Japanese imperial family. She is the eldest child of Crown Prince Fumihito and Crown Princess Kiko, niece of Emperor Naruhito, and granddaughter of Emperor Emeritus Akihito and his wife, Empress Emerita Michiko. In October 2021, upon her marriage to a commoner, Princess Mako formally lost her title, as required by the Imperial Household Law.

== Early life and education ==
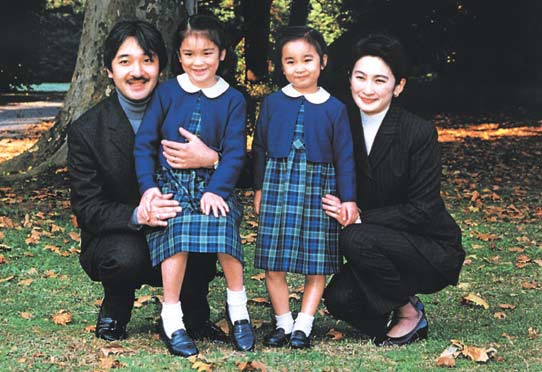
Mako with her parents and sister (c. 2000)

Mako Komuro was born Princess Mako of Akishino on 23 October 1991 to Fumihito, Prince Akishino, and Kiko, Princess Akishino, at Imperial Household Agency Hospital in Tokyo Imperial Palace, Chiyoda, Tokyo. She has a younger sister, Princess Kako, and a younger brother, Prince Hisahito. Mako was educated at the Gakushūin School in her kindergarten, primary, junior high school, and senior high school years. She studied English at University College, Dublin (UCD), in July–August 2010. She had an informal talk with the President of Ireland, Mary McAleese, and she visited Northern Ireland.

She obtained Japanese national certification in curation as well as a driver's license while she was an undergraduate student. She later studied art history at the University of Edinburgh for nine months, from September 2012 to May 2013. The Princess graduated from the International Christian University in Mitaka, Tokyo, on 26 March 2014 with a bachelor's degree in Art and Cultural Heritage.[1] On 17 September 2014, she moved back to the United Kingdom in order to study at the University of Leicester for a year, receiving an MA degree in Art Museum and Gallery Studies on 21 January 2016. In September 2016, she enrolled in the doctoral course of the Graduate School of Arts and Sciences, International Christian University.

== Public life ==
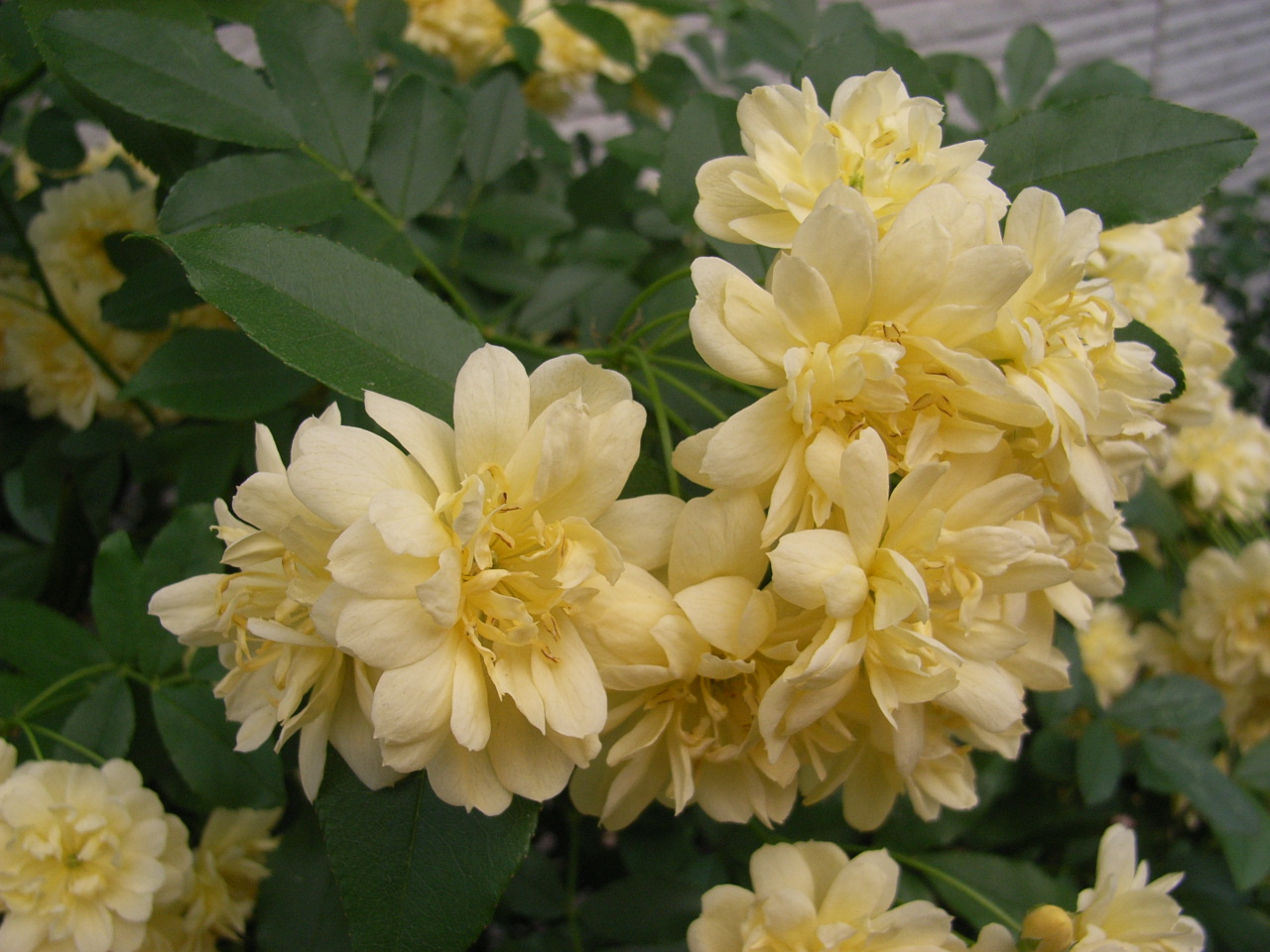
Lady Banks' rose, Rosa banksiae, designated imperial personal emblem of Mako

Mako has been considered by some to be an internet idol since 2004, when images of her in sailor fuku appeared on television. An image repository was set up, and a video featuring fanart of her was uploaded onto the popular video-sharing website Nico Nico Douga, attracting over 340,000 views and 86,000 comments. The Imperial Household Agency, responding to a request for comment, stated that they were not sure how they should handle this phenomenon, since they saw no signs of slander or insults against the Imperial Family.

In 2011, Princess Mako came of age and was conferred Grand Cordon of the Order of the Precious Crown on 23 October. Since then, she began attending official events as an adult member of the Imperial Family. She gave her patronage to a number of organizations, including the Japan Tennis Association and the Japan Kōgei Association.

=== Official visits ===
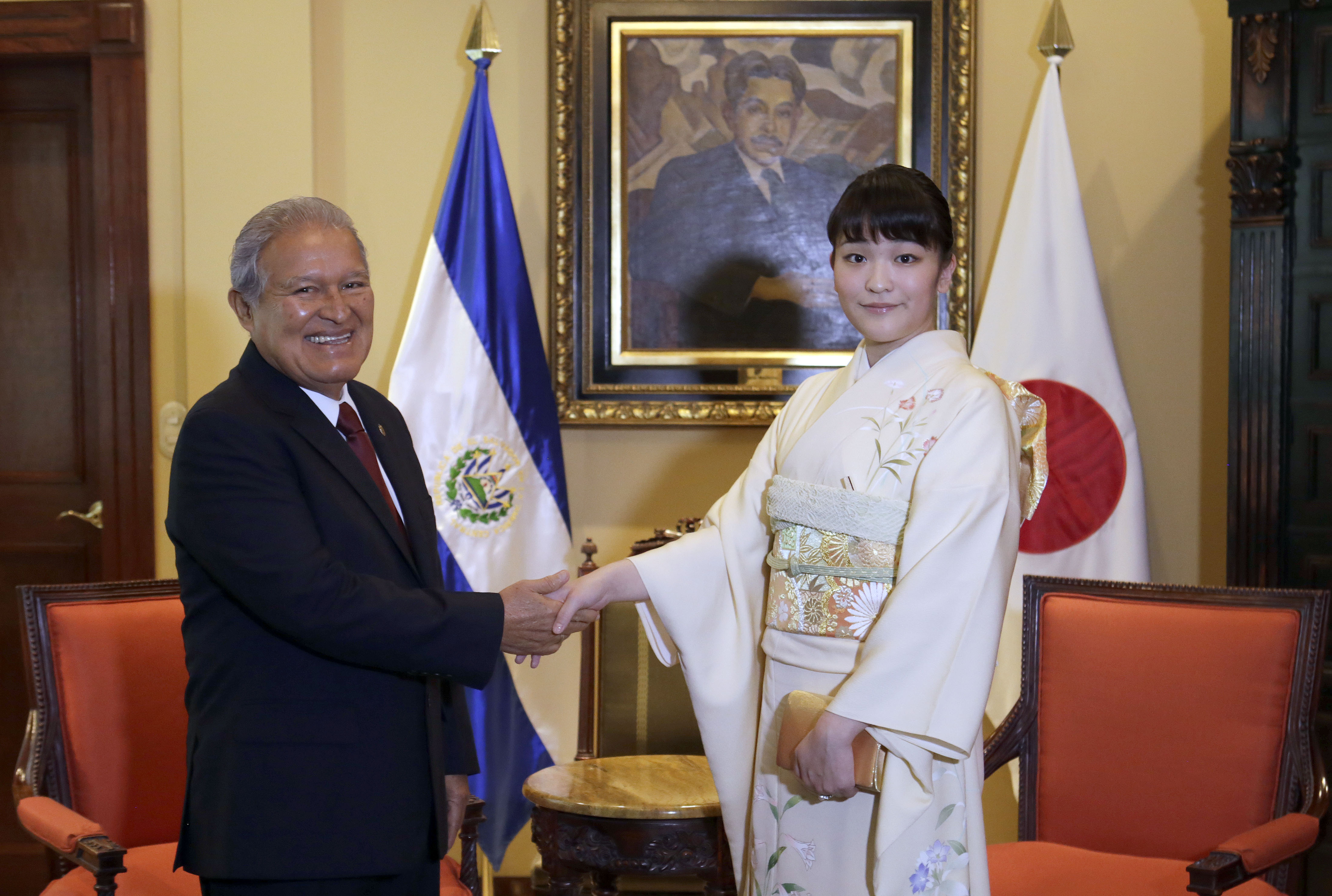
Mako meeting Salvadoran president Salvador Sánchez Cerén in 2015

- December 2015 – El Salvador and Honduras
- September 2016 – Paraguay
- June 2017 – Bhutan
- August 2017 – Hungary
- July 2018 – Brazil
- July 2019 – Peru and Bolivia

In October 2021, because of her marriage to a commoner, Princess Mako formally lost her title upon the marriage as required by Imperial Household Law, the ninth and last woman to be forced to do so. Male members of the Imperial family are allowed to marry commoners without losing their title.

== Personal interests ==
In August 2006, Mako visited Vienna, Austria for two weeks on a school-sponsored homestay program. She stayed in the home of an Austrian citizen who was a colleague of Tatsuhiko Kawashima, her maternal grandfather. Because Mako is interested in art and architecture, she visited the museums, St. Stephen's Cathedral and Schönbrunn Palace.

In July 2011, just four months after the Great East Japan earthquake, tsunami, and nuclear disaster, Mako worked as a volunteer in affected areas in Tohoku region without revealing her identity.

She became a project researcher at the University Museum in the University of Tokyo on 1 April 2016.

In April 2022, it was reported that she was working as an unpaid volunteer at the Metropolitan Museum of Art in New York City, assisting curators within the museum's Asian art collection.

== Marriage ==
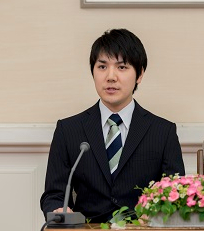
Kei Komuro at the press conference held for the couple's engagement announcement, 3 September 2017

In May 2017, it was announced that the Princess was expected to marry Kei Komuro. The two, both students at International Christian University (ICU), had met at a study abroad event in Tokyo. Komuro proposed to the Princess in December 2013.

The wedding was originally expected to take place in November 2018, but it was postponed after media reports of Komuro's mother in dispute with her former fiancé over ¥4 million ($36,000). Some of the money had been used to pay Komuro's tuition fees, and the dispute resulted in the public's disapproval of the match. Komuro stated that his mother believed the money was a gift and added that he wished to pay it back. Princess Mako blamed the postponement on the couple's immaturity at that time.

On 26 October 2021, Princess Mako officially married Komuro following the submission of their marriage document at the local ward office. Like her paternal aunt, Sayako, Princess Nori, and other princesses who married commoners in recent decades, she formally lost her title and became a commoner upon marriage as required by Imperial Household Law. In light of criticism of her marriage, she refused the Japanese government's taxpayer-funded payment of ¥140 million (US$1.3 million) given to royal women upon leaving the Imperial Family. She is the first female member of the imperial family to forgo an official wedding ceremony and a gift of money from the government.

By law, royals who give up their titles are not allowed to live inside the imperial quarters with their families. For this reason, Mako moved to her own residence in the Shibuya district in Tokyo while awaiting her passport issuance and US Visa. Komuro paid his mother's ex an undisclosed sum of money to resolve the debt with his mother in November 2021. The couple departed for New York that same month.

Kei Komuro began studying at Fordham University School of Law in August 2018 and graduated with a Juris Doctor in May 2021. He later joined Lowenstein Sandler, a law firm in New York as a law clerk. He passed New York's bar exam in October 2022 and began working as a lawyer in 2023 and is now reportedly an associate at Lowenstein Sandler specializing in global trade and national security.

On 30 May 2025, the Imperial Household Agency announced the birth of Mako's first child. The family has moved to Connecticut.

In August 2025, Mako and her husband were invited to attend her brother's coming of age ceremony in September 2025. Mako and Kei both declined, citing the distance and their new baby. However, Mako expressed a wish to see her family and spend some quality time with them sometime in the near future.

== Health ==
Weeks before her planned wedding, the Imperial Household Agency announced on behalf of Princess Mako that she had recently been diagnosed with complex post-traumatic stress disorder (C-PTSD) by the head of the quality assurance room of the NTT Medical Center Tokyo. The diagnosis determined that the C-PTSD originated during her primary high school years and continued due to strong criticism from imperial family members and the media.

== Titles, styles, and honours ==
=== Titles and styles ===
Mon of the Akishino branch of the imperial family

Mako was styled as Her Imperial Highness Princess Mako (眞子内親王殿下, Mako naishinnō denka), until her marriage on 26 October 2021, after which she became known as Mrs. Mako Komuro/Mrs. Kei Komuro.

=== Honours ===
==== National honours ====
- Japan: Grand Cordon of the Order of the Precious Crown (23 October 2011)

==== Foreign honours ====
- Brazil: Grand Cross of the Order of Rio Branco (12 October 2021)
- Paraguay: Grand Cross of the National Order of Merit (5 October 2021)
