= Grand Steward's Secretariat =

The Grand Steward's Secretariat (長官官房, Chōkan-kanbō) is the head department of the Imperial Household Agency of Japan.

== History ==
The origins of the structure of the Imperial Household can be traced back to the reign of Emperor Monmu, with the organisation of the government structure in 701 AD.

Prince Naruhito, in May 2004, criticized the then-grand steward, Toshio Yuasa, for putting pressure on Masako Owada, Naruhito's wife, to bear a male child. At a press conference, Naruhito said that his wife had "completely exhausted herself" trying to adapt to royal life, and added "there were developments that denied Masako's career (up to our marriage) as well as her personality".

== Organisation ==
The grand steward (長官, Chōkan) is the head of the secretariat, and is responsible for managing the part of the household staff who are omote (おもて), or "outside the house"; these employees serve as drivers, cooks, gardeners, or administrative officials.

The secretariat is composed of these divisions:

- Secretariat
- General Affairs
- Imperial Princes' Household Affairs
- Accounting
- Supplies
- Hospital of the Imperial Household

== Grand stewards ==
Number	Name	Term of office	Ex-service	Remarks
Grand stewards of the Imperial Household Office				
1	Yoshitami Matsudaira	3 May 1947 – 5 June 1948	Imperial Household Ministry	
2	Michiji Tajima	5 June 1948 – 31 May 1949	Civilian	cont.
Grand stewards of the Imperial Household Agency				
1	Michiji Tajima	1 June 1949 – 16 December 1953	Civilian	
2	Takeshi Usami	16 December 1953 – 26 May 1978	Home Ministry	
3	Tomohiko Tomita	26 May 1978 – 14 June 1988	National Police Agency	
4	Shōichi Fujimori	14 June 1988 – 19 January 1996	Ministry of Welfare, Environment Agency	
5	Sadame Kamakura	19 January 1996 – 2 April 2001	National Police Agency	
6	Toshio Yuasa	2 April 2001 – 1 April 2005	Ministry of Home Affairs	
7	Shingo Haketa	1 April 2005 – 1 June 2012	Ministry of Health	
8	Noriyuki Kazaoka	1 June 2012 – 26 September 2016	Ministry of Construction	
9	Shin'ichirō Yamamoto	26 September 2016 – 17 Dec 2019	Ministry of Home Affairs	
10	Yasuhiko Nishimura	17 Dec 2019 – 24 Dec 2025	National Police Agency	
11	Buichiro Kuroda	24 Dec 2025 – present	Ministry of Home Affairs; Ministry of Internal Affairs and Communications	
