= Toshio Yuasa =

Japanese government official (born 1935)

Toshio Yuasa (Japanese: 湯浅利夫, romanized: Yuasa Toshio) (born October 3, 1935) is a retired Japanese civil servant who is a former Grand Steward of the Imperial Household Agency (2001–2005). He graduated from the University of Tokyo.

Political offices
Preceded by Sadame Kamakura	Grand Steward of the Imperial Household Agency; 2001–2005	Succeeded by Shingo Haketa
