= Japanese imperial succession debate =

Discussion about changing the Japanese throne's laws of succession

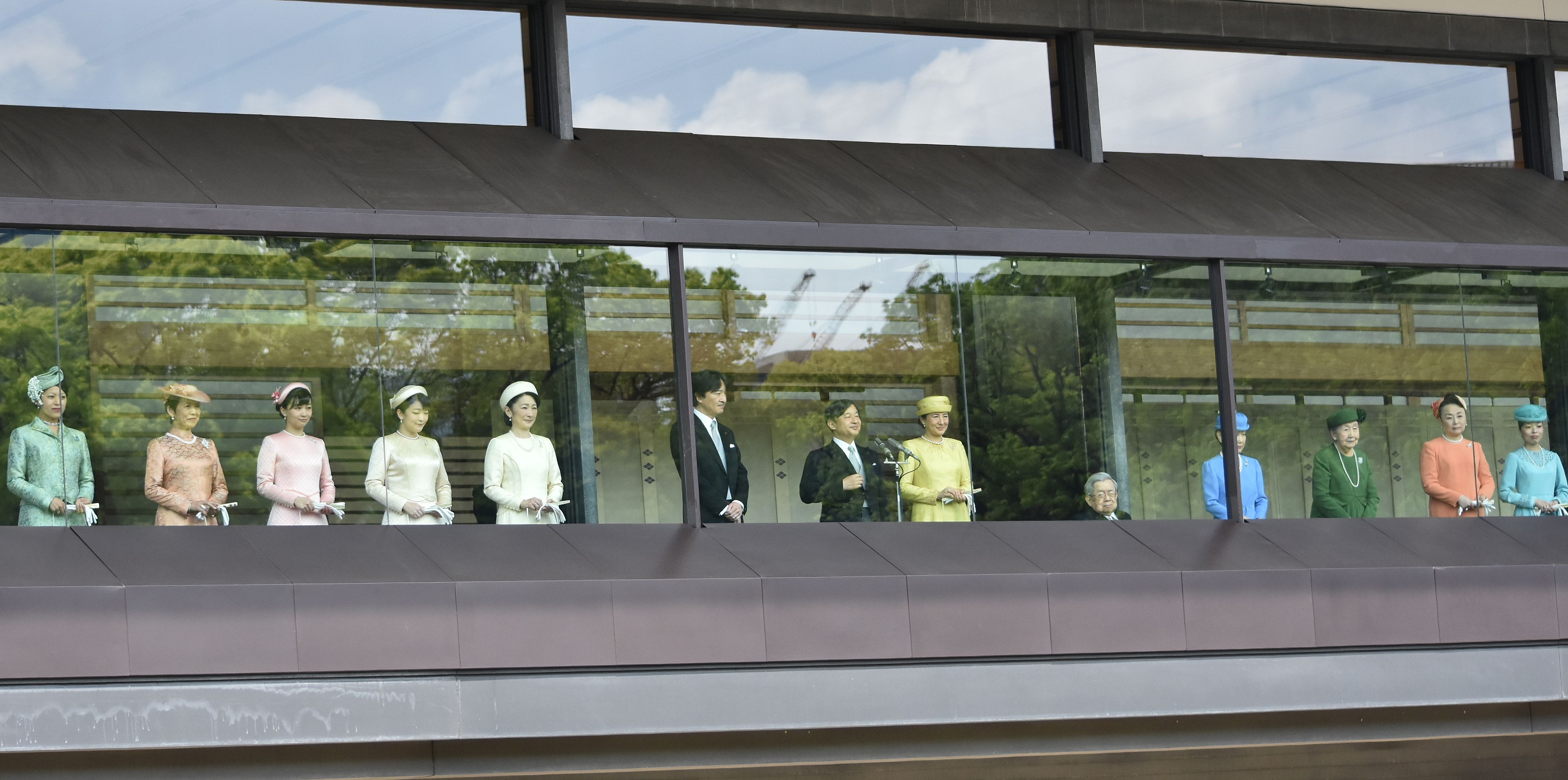
Members of the Japanese imperial family appearing to the people during celebrations for the new emperor's enthronement from the balcony of the main audience hall of the imperial palace in Tokyo in 2019. The lack of male members during the last couple of decades has led to an intensified succession debate and how to change the laws surrounding the imperial house.

From 2001 to 2006, Japan discussed the possibility of changing the laws of succession to the Chrysanthemum Throne, which is currently limited to males in the male line of the Japanese imperial family.

As of November 2026, there are three people in the line of succession to the current emperor Naruhito: Crown Prince Akishino, Prince Hisahito, and Prince Hitachi. Prior to the birth of Prince Hisahito in 2006, the government of Japan considered changes to the Imperial Household Law to allow additional potential successors to the throne. In July 2026, legislation was passed to allow the adoption of former male members in the patrilineal line. Although the adoptee is not eligible to succeed the throne, his male patrilineal descendants are eligible and the order is determined by their natural birth order. Yet, the debate still remains and currently no former male members have been adopted in.

== Background ==
Traditionally, the imperial throne was passed on under custom which resembled the rule of agnatic seniority. Theoretically, the emperor could declare any man or woman his heir, so long as they were of Imperial blood and a member of the Imperial family. A matrilineal emperor was theoretically possible. However, in practice, preference was given to first-born male offspring of a preceding male monarch, followed by his brothers, sons, other males of the immediate male-line family, and ultimately male members of the Shinnōke houses, cadet branches distantly related to the reigning monarch. Because there existed no restrictions on remarriage or polygyny in historical Japan, there existed usually many male relatives who could take over the throne.

However, there have been eight empresses regnant of Japan. All empresses regnant were descendants of the Imperial Dynasty in the male line. Such successions have happened for a variety of reasons. On some occasions, the direct male heir was only a toddler and unable to perform the imperial rituals. In such an instance, his mother, aunt or elder sister, if also of Imperial lineage through her patriline, temporarily took over the throne until the child came to puberty, which was deemed sufficient for a boy's accession. The offspring of female emperors had succession rights under the Nara period law that was used up until the Meiji restoration, and Japan practiced a system of dual lineage, thus most early emperors (Asuka to early Heian period) were related to the Imperial Family via both lines. The last time Japan had an empress regnant was in 1771, when Empress Go-Sakuramachi abdicated in favor of her nephew, Emperor Go-Momozono.

After the Meiji Restoration, Japan imported the Prussian model of imperial succession, in which princesses were explicitly excluded from succession. The Japanese government also banned polygyny, which was previously allowed to any family with noble rank (samurai or kuge), particularly if the first wife could not produce male offspring. The Imperial Household Law of 1947 instituted a further restriction: only the descendants of the male line of Emperor Taishō (the father of then-emperor Hirohito) could be part of the official imperial family and have a claim to succession, excluding all other male lines of the imperial dynasty and specifically barring the emperor and other members of the imperial family from adopting children.

Under Chapter 1: Article 1 of the Imperial Household Law, "The Imperial Throne shall be succeeded to by a male offspring in the male line belonging to the Imperial Lineage". The line of succession is detailed in Article 2 as:

1. The eldest son of the emperor
2. The eldest son of the emperor's eldest son
3. Other descendants of the eldest son of the emperor
4. The second son of the emperor and his descendants
5. Other descendants of the emperor
6. Brothers of the emperor and their descendants
7. Uncles of the emperor and their descendants

== Situation ==
The Japanese imperial dynasty, traditionally descended from the Emperor Jimmu, is perhaps the oldest patrilineage in the world, and members of that single dynasty have ruled Japan for nearly 2700 years, according to legends. The ancient Japanese system is of agnatic succession, generally by primogeniture, with the caveat that, in case the imperial family lacked heirs, they may adopt a boy from collateral cadet branches of the Imperial lineage. Four such cadet branches of the imperial family had, from ancient times, held the privilege of supplying an heir in adoption to the throne of Japan. The need for adoption rarely arose, because emperors normally had several consorts, and the sons of all consorts were equally eligible to succeed.

All of these traditions and solutions had been discontinued or prohibited by the 1950s. Emperor Shōwa (Hirohito) was the emperor of the Japanese Empire during World War II. After the war ended, the Diet passed a new Imperial Household Law that limited the succession to agnatic descendants of Emperor Shōwa's father, the Emperor Taishō, thus excluding cadet branches of the imperial family. It also prohibited the practice of adoption. Since the days of the Emperor Meiji, the practice of having several consorts had been discontinued. The imperial family, therefore, became very small after the new Imperial Household Law was adopted.

By the turn of the century, these restrictions had resulted in a situation where the dynasty came perilously close to extinction. Emperor Emeritus Akihito (eldest son of Emperor Shōwa) had only two sons: Naruhito and Fumihito. The younger son, Prince Fumihito, was the first to marry, and he soon became the father of two daughters, then-Princess Mako (b. 1991) and Princess Kako (b. 1994), but he had no son until 6 September 2006, when his wife gave birth to Prince Hisahito. Akihito's eldest son, Naruhito, who married in 1993, did not become a father until 1 December 2001, when his wife gave birth to a daughter, the Princess Aiko. Naruhito and his wife received their child with great joy, since they had almost despaired of parenthood. However, the birth of the princess opened the question of the succession to public debate, because Naruhito's wife, who had suffered a miscarriage previously, and was very close to forty years of age, was unlikely to bear further children.

Akihito's brother, Masahito, Prince Hitachi and his wife have no children.

The two other collateral members of the imperial family also had only daughters: Prince Tomohito of Mikasa had two daughters, Princess Akiko (b. 1981) and Princess Yōko (b. 1983); while Norihito, Prince Takamado had three daughters, Princess Tsuguko (b. 1986), then-Princess Noriko (b. 1988) and then-Princess Ayako (b. 1990). Prior to the birth of Prince Hisahito in 2006, no male heir had been born into the imperial family in nearly 41 years.

=== Solutions ===
As solutions to this issue, two main logical countermeasures can be considered. In fact, during the mid-Heisei period and later, when the imperial line faced the threat of extinction, both of these proposals were brought to the table for discussion.

- Expand the range of candidates while maintaining the principle of patrilineal descent from the first emperor (bansei ikkei). Specifically, this would involve reinstating into the imperial household the male members and male-line descendants of former imperial family branches who lost their imperial status in the past (commonly referred to as the "former imperial family" and their male-line descendants), thereby preserving patrilineal succession (bansei ikkei).
- Relax the principle from "patrilineal descendants of the first emperor" to simply "descendants of the emperor". In other words, this would entail permitting the inclusion of male members of the general public who are not patrilineal descendants of the first emperor into the imperial family, thereby accepting an unprecedented form of succession not based on patrilineal descent—namely, succession through female or maternal lines (commonly referred to as female-line or maternal emperors).

The two proposals are not simply alternatives, as the first one would seek to reinstate former imperial households, while the latter would seek to allow the female members already in the Imperial Household to succeed to the throne and have children themselves giving the imperial line female line heirs.

==== Proposals for the return of former princely houses ====
Historically, male members of collateral branches of the Imperial House who were distantly related to the reigning emperor were at times removed from imperial status through Shinseki kōka (臣籍降下), becoming commoners. Their male-line descendants nevertheless remained part of the broader imperial lineage. In contemporary debates on reform of the Imperial House Law, some commentators and policymakers have proposed restoring descendants of former imperial branches to imperial status in order to address concerns regarding the declining number of eligible heirs to the Chrysanthemum Throne.

Historical precedent exists for the use of collateral branches of the Imperial House to resolve succession shortages. Upon the death of Emperor Go-Momozono in 1779 at the age of 21 years, the throne faced a succession crisis because the emperor left no surviving son, only a daughter, Imperial Princess Yoshiko. To secure the succession, Prince Kanehito of the Kan'in-no-miya house, one of the four shinnōke collateral branches maintained as potential sources of heirs, was adopted by Go-Momozono and subsequently acceded to the throne as Emperor Kōkaku. Historians have regarded this succession as one of the most significant examples of a collateral imperial line being called upon to preserve the continuity of the throne. The accession of Emperor Kōkaku has been regarded as a historical example of a collateral branch of the Imperial House serving as a reserve source of male-line successors to the throne. Emperor Kōkaku's accession in 1779 marked the first succession from a collateral branch of the Imperial House since Emperor Go-Hanazono in the 15th century. Emperor Go-Hanazono himself had been selected from the Fushimi-no-miya branch of the Imperial House after the death of Emperor Shōkō without a surviving heir, demonstrating the historical function of collateral imperial lines in maintaining dynastic continuity.

During the drafting of the Imperial House Law of 1889, Inoue Kowashi argued that, should a succession crisis similar to that associated with Emperor Keitai arise, male-line descendants of earlier imperial branches could be sought even after many generations. According to the records of the deliberations on the Imperial House Law and Imperial Family Ordinance drafts, he maintained that descendants could be recalled even if their separation from the imperial house extended back numerous generations.

Medieval historian Kawachi Yoshisuke has argued, on the basis of his analysis of the Jinnō Shōtōki, that imperial legitimacy was historically understood to derive fundamentally from male-line descent rather than from proximity to the reigning emperor.

Although members of the imperial family have repeatedly undergone shinseki kōka throughout Japanese history, contemporary discussions focus primarily on the eleven collateral princely houses (Ōke) that lost imperial status in October 1947.

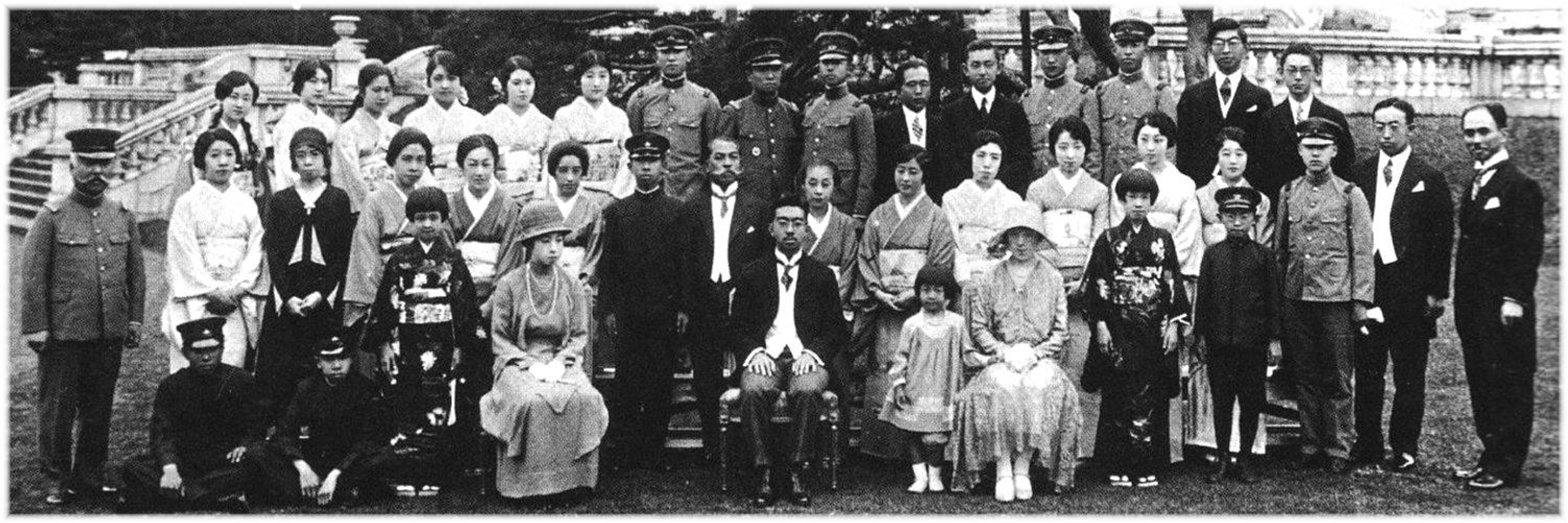
Emperor Shōwa and members of the extended imperial family (c. 1937)

All eleven houses were descended from the Fushimi-no-miya line, the oldest hereditary collateral branch established to provide potential successors should the main imperial line fail. Proponents of restoration frequently cite the historical role of the Fushimi-no-miya and its descendant houses as former succession reserves for the throne.

Supporters also note that the Fushimi-no-miya line maintained close ties with the reigning imperial family through adoption and marriage, particularly during the Meiji era and thereafter.

The eleven princely houses were removed from the Imperial Family during the allied occupation of Japan as part of post-war reforms. On 14 October 1947, fifty-one members of these houses lost imperial status, leaving only the immediate family of Emperor Shōwa and the households of his three brothers within the Imperial Family.

Supporters of restoration have also pointed to statements attributed to Emperor Shōwa indicating that former imperial family members should remain conscious that they might one day be called upon to assume imperial responsibilities. Following their departure from the Imperial Household, former members maintained social and familial ties with the remaining imperial family, including through the establishment of the Kikuei Friendship Association (菊栄親睦会).

The question of restoring former princely houses generally concerns descendants of the eleven collateral princely houses that lost imperial status in 1947. According to testimony presented to the government's Expert Panel on Stable Imperial Succession in 2021, only a subset of those houses are generally understood to retain living male-line descendants in the twenty-first century.

Among the former princely houses, the following are commonly identified as retaining living male-line descendants who could potentially fall within the scope of restoration proposals:

- Kaya-no-miya (賀陽宮家)
- Kuni-no-miya (久邇宮家)
- Higashikuni-no-miya (東久邇宮家)
- Takeda-no-miya (竹田宮家)

Constitutional scholar Momochi Akira testified before the Expert Panel that these four family lines were believed to include at least ten unmarried young male-line descendants in their twenties or younger.

The remaining former princely houses, namely Asaka-no-miya, Kitashirakawa-no-miya, Nashimoto-no-miya, Yamashina-no-miya, Kachō-no-miya, Kan'in-no-miya, and Fushimi-no-miya, are generally not regarded as possessing living male-line descendants who would be relevant to current restoration proposals.

In its 2021 report, the government-sponsored Expert Panel on Stable Imperial Succession examined possible measures to secure an adequate number of imperial family members, including the adoption of male-line descendants of former princely houses by current members of the imperial family and their subsequent restoration to imperial status.

Supporters contend that descendants of the former princely houses remain part of the historic male-line imperial lineage (dansei, 男系) and could therefore help preserve traditional principles of male-line succession and bansei ikkei (万世一系).

Arguments in favour of restoration have also cited Article 2 of the current Imperial House Law and parliamentary discussions indicating that descendants of former princely houses continue to possess family connections with the present imperial family. Proponents maintain that restoring such descendants to imperial status would not conflict with Article 14 of the Constitution of Japan, which guarantees equality before the law.

Critics, however, have questioned whether individuals whose families have spent decades outside the Imperial Household should be eligible for restoration and have advocated alternative reforms, including the retention of women in the imperial family after marriage or the introduction of female-line succession.

==== Imperially descended lineages outside the Imperial House ====
Beyond the 11 former princely houses (Ōke and Miyake) removed from the Imperial House in 1947, discussions concerning the imperial succession have occasionally referred to other male-line descendants of earlier emperors who exist outside the Imperial Family. These include both the so-called "other imperial regent houses" (皇別摂家, kōbetsu sekke) and a number of historical aristocratic and warrior lineages traditionally classified as kōbetsu (皇別), or families of imperial descent.

The kōbetsu sekke originated when members of the Imperial House entered noble families of the Fujiwara clan, particularly the Five regent houses (sekke), in order to continue lines that lacked male heirs. As a result, some of these houses are, in strictly genealogical terms, male-line descendants of emperors.

However, proposals to restore imperial status have generally focused on the former princely houses rather than the kōbetsu sekke. Objections commonly raised include that:

- their imperial ancestors left the Imperial House centuries earlier, in some cases more than 250 years before the 1947 separation of the former princely houses;
- upon succession into the regent houses, they became members of the Fujiwara clan, traditionally classified as shinbetsu (神別) rather than kōbetsu;
- eligibility for the throne historically depended not only on bloodline but also on recognised lineage and status (家柄 and 家格);
- the regent houses (摂家) and other court noble houses were historically houses of subjects rather than branches of the Imperial House; and
- no member of the kōbetsu sekke is known to have possessed succession rights after entering the regent houses.

A broader group of imperial-descended families exists outside both the Imperial House and the former princely houses. Such lineages were traditionally recorded as kōbetsu in the early ninth-century genealogical compilation Shinsen Shōjiroku, which classified aristocratic families according to their claimed ancestry.

Among the most prominent surviving examples are descendants of the Seiwa Genji and Uda Genji, including the Hosokawa, Tokugawa, Matsudaira, Ogasawara, Satake, Nanbu and Kyōgoku families. Unlike many other ancient kōbetsu lineages, these houses maintained continuous aristocratic or daimyō traditions into the modern period and were recognised as families of particularly high social standing (家柄 and 家格).

Other historically important imperial-descended lineages include the Ariwara clan, Tachibana clan, Yoshimine clan, Takashina clan and Fumiya clan. Although these lineages traced their paternal ancestry to emperors or imperial princes, many either became extinct, lost their historical prominence, or ceased to possess aristocratic status comparable to that of the major warrior and court houses.

The existence of these lineages has occasionally been cited in succession debates as evidence that male-line descendants of earlier emperors survive outside the Imperial Family. Nevertheless, public and political discussion has overwhelmingly centred on the restoration of the former princely houses, and no proposal involving historical warrior, court noble, or other kōbetsu families has gained significant political support.

==== Empress regnant ====
There have been eight reigning empresses throughout Japan's history who occupied the throne in ten reigns between the 6th and 18th centuries. All historical reigning empresses, or female tenno, belonged to the imperial patriline and are therefore classified as dansei joshi (male-line women); no empress regnant in Japanese history founded a matrilineal dynastic line.

In many cases, reigning empresses ascended the throne during periods of succession uncertainty, when an appropriate male heir was either a minor, politically contested, or otherwise unable to assume the throne immediately. Historical scholarship has frequently interpreted several female reigns as transitional arrangements intended to preserve dynastic continuity until a male successor could be installed. Examples include Genmei and Genshō, who reigned before the accession of Emperor Shōmu, and the later reign of Empress Go-Sakuramachi, who abdicated in favour of her nephew Emperor Go-Momozono in 1771.

Unlike several hereditary monarchies elsewhere, historical reigning empresses did not establish new reigning branches through their descendants. Rather, they functioned within the existing male-line imperial genealogy, with succession subsequently passing to another member of the paternal imperial line.

In modern times, the term "female-line tenno" (女系天皇 or 母系天皇) refers to a monarch who is not descended through the male line from the first emperor. This would mark a break from the traditional male-line succession that has characterized the imperial institution throughout history.

The distinction between a female emperor (女性天皇) and a matrilineal emperor (女系天皇) remains a significant aspect of the modern succession debate. Some conservative politicians have argued that a woman belonging to the existing imperial male line could ascend the throne without altering the historical principle of male-line descent, while succession by her descendants would create a matrilineal line. In a 2022 interview, Liberal Democratic Party politician Takaichi Sanae stated that she was "not opposed to female emperors" while opposing matrilineal emperors (「私は、女性天皇には反対していません。女系天皇に反対しているのです」), distinguishing between the accession of a woman belonging to the existing imperial male line and succession through her descendants. As prime minister in 2026, Takaichi stated in the National Diet that the Imperial Household Law restricts succession to male-line males and that she respected the government's expert-panel conclusion that eligibility should remain limited to "male-line male descendants belonging to the imperial lineage", signalling support for retaining the existing succession framework.

Emperor Naruhito, Empress Masako and their only child Princess Aiko in 2022

A recurring theme in the debate has been the distinction between support for an empress regnant and support for matrilineal succession. While public opinion polls have frequently shown strong support for the accession of Princess Aiko, the only child of current Emperor Naruhito, some commentators have noted that political discussions have often focused instead on the implications for succession through her descendants. Proponents of an empress regnant argue that Princess Aiko's accession could be considered separately from the question of whether her children should inherit the throne, citing the historical precedent that all previous ruling empresses belonged to the imperial male line and were not founders of new dynastic lines.

Due to laws passed in July 2026, female members of the imperial family may choose to remain members upon marriage. The husband and their children remain commoners, in order to prevent the possibility of a matrilineal emperor.

However, should a female member of the imperial family marry a male member of the imperial family, her children are eligible under her husband's line.

Imperial Princesses (内親王) (Note: 内親王 (Naishinnō) are the daughters and granddaughters of an emperor (reigning or not). The male equivalent is 親王 (Shinnō, or Imperial Prince).) . If an Imperial Princess, who is the emperor's daughter, marries a hypothetical Prince (王) (Note: 王 (Ō, or Prince, though literally translated as King) is a third generation or later male descendant of an emperor (reigning or not). The female equivalent is 女王 (Joō, or Princess, though literally translated as Queen).) who is 4th in line for the throne, the Imperial Princess becomes a Princess Consort (王妃) (Note: Ōhi. If she were the wife of an Imperial Prince she would be 親王妃 (Shinnōhi). Technically, she is demoted in rank based on the order of precedence in the imperial family, under which she is treated as her husband's consort, not the daughter of an emperor.) and her eldest son is 5th in line for the throne, despite the fact she is the emperor's daughter, since her male offspring and descendants gain their succession rights solely from their father.

However, there is the argument for matrilineal emperors, which seeks to reform the long-standing principles of the imperial institution to allow for the incorporation of commoner males into the imperial family, thereby broadening succession rights among current members and their descendants.

=== Male members of the imperial family ===
Current emperor	Living members	Deceased members
Emperor Taishō
Emperor Shōwa	Yasuhito, Prince Chichibu	Nobuhito, Prince Takamatsu	Takahito, Prince Mikasa
Emperor Emeritus Akihito	Masahito, Prince Hitachi ③	Prince Tomohito of Mikasa	Yoshihito, Prince Katsura	Norihito, Prince Takamado
Emperor Naruhito	Fumihito, Crown Prince ①
Prince Hisahito ②

=== Order of succession ===
Rank	Successor	Born	Age
1	Fumihito, Crown Prince of Japan	30 November 1965	60
2	Prince Hisahito of Akishino	6 September 2006	20
3	Masahito, Prince Hitachi	28 November 1935	90

== Debate ==
In the early 2000s, the succession controversy emerged as a political issue. The Asahi Shimbun published an editorial in May 2006 suggesting that the current system was unsustainable. In an Asahi Shimbun survey in March 2006, 82% of the respondents supported the revision of the Imperial Household Law to allow a woman to ascend to the Imperial Throne. Then Prime Minister Junichirō Koizumi also strongly supported the revision, pledging to present a bill to the 2006 session of the parliament.

Some conservative lawmakers opposed Koizumi and said the debate was premature. The current emperor's cousin, Prince Tomohito of Mikasa, also opposed the proposal, saying that the official male members of the Japanese imperial family might take up concubines in order to produce male members because it was previously possible for a male illegitimate child to assume the imperial throne. Later he said that this remark was just a joke. Another solution would be to restore the Shinnoke (agnatic collateral branches of the imperial dynasty which had been disinherited by the United States) to the line of succession.

Prince Akishino's wife, Princess Kiko, gave birth to a baby boy on September 6, 2006. The child, Prince Hisahito, is now second in line to the imperial throne. Following the birth of Prince Hisahito, the political debate surrounding succession subsided. Koizumi withdrew his bill, though public opinion polling suggested that support for the change was still around 68%.

Controversy exists as to what extent the current rule of succession under the Imperial Household Law should be changed. Those on the Right advocate a change, holding the Prussian-style agnatic primogeniture, but bringing back the previously excluded male relatives into the Imperial household. Liberals advocate the adoption of absolute primogeniture. Moderates advocate re-adoption of earlier, indigenous customs of succession, that is, that a female can succeed to the throne as long as she holds precedence in seniority or proximity within the patrilineal kinship. Princess Takamatsu, the last surviving Arisugawa-Takamatsu and aunt to Emperor Akihito, advocated the traditional, customary rights of female princesses to succession, in her media interviews and articles, after the birth of Princess Aiko.

Adoption of absolute primogeniture would permit, as has happened in history, unmarried or widowed female descendants in the male line of the Imperial House to inherit the Chrysanthemum Throne, but would also allow something unprecedented: it would allow married princesses and princesses' children whose fathers are not descendants in the male line of the earlier emperors to ascend the throne. This scenario could be interpreted as meaning a new dynasty would take over the Chrysanthemum Throne, since dynasties are traditionally defined patrilineally.

The Abe government had indicated that it would begin discussions about the status of women in the imperial family soon after Naruhito ascends the throne. Academic historian in Imperial Japan Kenneth Ruoff opined that "I don't think this would be their preference ... But they don't have any choice. They are facing extinction of the imperial line."

=== Timeline ===
==== 2005 ====
- On January 24, the Japanese government announced that it would consider allowing the Crown Prince and Princess to adopt a male child, in order to avoid a possible "heir crisis". Adoption from other male-line branches of the Imperial Line is an age-old imperial Japanese tradition for dynastic purposes, prohibited only in modern times by Western influence. The child would presumably be adopted from one of the former imperial branches which lost imperial status after World War II. A government-appointed panel of experts submitted a report on October 25, 2005, recommending that the imperial succession law be amended to permit equal primogeniture.
- In November 2005, it was reported that Emperor Akihito's cousin Prince Tomohito of Mikasa had objected to the reversal of the male-only succession, in a column of the magazine of the welfare association which he serves as president. Prince Tomohito had suggested four options to continue the male-only line succession there; the fourth was permitting the emperor or crown prince to take a concubine, which was allowed by the former law of imperial succession.

==== 2006 ====
- On January 20, Prime Minister Junichirō Koizumi used part of his annual keynote speech to address the controversy when he pledged to submit a bill to the Japanese Diet letting women ascend to the throne so that imperial succession may be continued into the future in a stable manner. Koizumi did not announce any particular timing for the legislation to be introduced, nor did he provide details about its content, but said that it would be in line with the conclusions of the 2005 government panel.
- On February 1, 2006, former trade minister Takeo Hiranuma caused a controversy by arguing against the proposed reform bill because Princess Aiko might marry a foreigner in the future.
- On February 6, it was announced that Prince Akishino's wife Princess Kiko was pregnant, and would give birth due September.
- On September 6, Princess Kiko delivered a boy, later named Prince Hisahito. According to the current succession law he is second in line to the throne, but Princess Aiko, who now holds no right to succession, would have precedence over him as well as over her uncle if the law is changed.

==== 2007 ====
- On January 3, Prime Minister Shinzō Abe announced that he would drop the proposal to alter the Imperial Household Act.
- In September 2007, Abe's successor Yasuo Fukuda stated he was in favour of reforming the Imperial Household Law to allow female succession.

==== 2009 ====
- In November, in a speech commemorating his 20th anniversary since ascending the Chrysanthemum Throne, Emperor Akihito refrained from giving his own suggestions on the succession debate, but urged the government to consider the opinions of his sons Crown Prince Naruhito and Prince Akishino.

==== 2011 ====
- On October 5, Shingo Haketa, Grand Steward of the Imperial Household Agency, visited Prime Minister Yoshihiko Noda at his office and told him that it was a matter of urgency to enable female members of the imperial family to create family branches. According to the Grand Steward, the imperial family cannot maintain its activities in a stable manner. Twelve imperial family members were adults under the age of 60 but half of these were unmarried princesses between the ages of 20 and 30. As the princesses leave the family through marriage, it would become more and more difficult for the imperial family to perform its duties. Considering that Prince Hisahito was the only grandchild of Emperor Akihito eligible to assume the throne, the agency also said that it would be necessary to design a system to ensure stable succession to the imperial throne, although this would be a mid- to long-term concern. Grand Steward Haketa has reportedly been worried about the succession issue when he took the top post at the agency in 2005. After the Democratic Party of Japan (DPJ) won the election in September 2009, he explained the situation to Cabinet members, urging the government to address the issue. The government has yet to act upon his request.
- On November 25, Chief Cabinet Secretary Osamu Fujimura said that a way had to be found to secure a "stable" accession to the Chrysanthemum Throne, expressing concern over the small number of successors to the crown: "The government is aware that future anxiety over securing a stable succession has not been resolved ... Maintaining a steady succession is an issue that relates to the core of the nation and the government will consider it based on thorough discussions from various levels of the public." The next day, former trade minister Takeo Hiranuma, now a founding member of the Sunrise Party, contended during a meeting with conservative organizations that the male line of imperial heirs should be maintained. Hiranuma suggested that if female members were allowed to remain in the family after marrying a commoner, they should try and marry a member of the eleven branches of the imperial family that were removed from the line of succession in October 1947. Hiranuma also proposed to reinstate the former branches in the Imperial family, to increase its size.
- On December 1, Prime Minister Noda called for a national debate on whether women should be allowed to retain their imperial status after marriage. He did not set any deadlines but declared his intention to build a framework to discuss the issue. Two days later, some government officials told Kyodo News that the issue of the female members' status "does not appear to be a pressing task. The government has no energy left to spare for that." According to Kyodo, a source close to the imperial family expressed concern because of the government's hesitant attitude: "It's obvious that the imperial family's range of activities will become narrower in the future without reforming the current system. A new system needs to be created before Princess Mako gets married. I'd like to see the public take more interest in the matter."

==== 2012 ====
- On January 6, Chief Cabinet Secretary Fujimura told a press conference that the government recognized "that maintaining the stability of the activities of the Imperial Household and lessening the burden of official duties placed on Their Majesties the Emperor and Empress are major issues of a high degree of urgency." He announced that they would focus on discussing the status of female members and the possibility for them to create new family branches but that there would be no debate about giving succession rights to them or to their children. He announced that "in order to contribute to the discussion", expert hearings would take place once or twice every month. Former Supreme Court Justice and lawyer Itsuo Sonobe was appointed to the position of Special Advisor to the Cabinet to lead the hearings, "as he is highly knowledgeable about the Imperial Household system" and formerly served as deputy chairman of the Advisory Council on Imperial Household Law that recommended in 2005 that the right to ascend the Chrysanthemum Throne should be expanded to women and imperial family offspring of female lineage.
- On January 7 and 8, a Kyodo News poll showed that 65.5% of the Japanese people supported the idea of allowing female members of the imperial family to create their own branches of the family and to retain their imperial status after marriage. The telephone survey drew valid responses from 1,016 eligible voters in 1,459 households randomly dialed across Japan, apart from parts of Fukushima Prefecture evacuated by the nuclear crisis.
- On February 10, a Japan Times editorial accused Fujimura of "beating around the bush" by solely talking about the importance of maintaining "the activities of the Imperial Family in a stable manner" and of lightening "the burden of the Emperor and Empress's official duties". It voiced concerns that "if male members of the Imperial Family become very few, it will become difficult to keep the Imperial line" and that "given the current situation of the Imperial Family, making a woman Imperial Family member serve as an emperor may become unavoidable", blaming the government for "shying away from discussing a possible situation in which there will be no males to succeed to the throne". Colin Jones, a law professor at Doshisha University in Kyoto, warned that, without changes, there would not be a backup plan if Prince Hisahito should fail to have a son or be incapacitated in some way: "Monarchies have extended families just so that there's a source of spares ... Over time there will be no other members of the imperial family to act as proxies." According to Jones, it is necessary to also address the succession issue as soon as possible, since it may be too late to do so by the time Hisahito becomes emperor. "They can't just suddenly conjure up new imperials ... They've got to do something now."
- On February 29, the first hearing took place. On this occasion Dr. Akira Imatani, Professor of medieval Japanese history at Teikyo University, and Soichiro Tawara, a journalist, gave their opinions. Both recommended that female members of the imperial family should retain their status after marriage. Tahara told the government panel: "Times have changed and Japan has become a society that promotes gender equality. I think refusing to allow females to maintain their status is an anachronism." Tahara and Imatani proposed that commoner husbands of imperial princesses be granted quasi-imperial status, which would permit them to attend official events while keeping their jobs, if even with some restrictions.
- On March 29, the second hearing took place. Dr. Masayuki Yamauchi, professor of international affairs at the Graduate School of the University of Tokyo, and Dr. Makoto Oishi, professor of constitutional law at the Graduate School of Kyoto University, also expressed their endorsement of princesses establishing their own branches. Yamauchi proposed, in order to reduce the burden on the public budget, to limit the eligibility to princesses within the second degree of kinship to the emperor. (That group included the three granddaughters of Emperor Akihito, Princesses Aiko, Mako and Kako.) According to Yamauchi, at some point in the future the imperial family may consist of a single nuclear family, that of Prince Hisahito, and support by female-headed family branches might prove helpful in avoiding such isolation.
- On April 10, the third hearing took place. The experts at this hearing were Yoshiko Sakurai and Professor Akira Momochi, and these two were the first to clearly oppose the idea of letting imperial women retain their royal status upon marriage. Professor Momochi teaches law at Nihon University, Japan's largest university. Ms. Sakurai is a well-known journalist and social critic in Japan, especially famous for her right-wing and sometimes ultra-nationalistic stance. Although there are no plans to give the princesses succession rights, Ms. Sakurai and Professor Momochi still have concerns that female-headed imperial family branches could eventually break the paternal lineage. As a solution to the decrease of imperial family members and the lack of eligible male heirs, they suggested revising the Imperial Household Law so that male descendants of former imperial families which renounced their royal status in 1947 be allowed to return to the imperial family as adoptees. Ms. Sakurai also proposed reinstating four of the former imperial branches: "There were too many, so they were cut back. Now we're in the complete opposite position, why can't we take the opposite measure?" The background to this statement is that up until the Meiji Restoration there were only four collateral branches of the imperial family, the shinnōke. In the 19th century, more houses were created from branches of the Fushimi-no-miya house, the ōke. By 1935, there were eleven collateral branches of the imperial family altogether, in addition to the families of Emperor Showa's three brothers. According to the Yomiuri Shimbun, the government is against the idea of reinstating the former collateral branches, "saying it will be difficult to obtain public support as the descendants were born as commoners".
- On April 23, the fourth hearing took place. The experts at this hearing also backed the establishment of female branches of the imperial family.
- On May 4, the Yomiuri Shimbun reported that the government was planning to consult the ruling DPJ and major opposition parties on a draft for the revision of the Imperial Household Act before submitting a bill to an extraordinary Diet session in autumn or to an ordinary sitting of the legislature next year. Looking back at the hearings, one government official said, "A wider than expected range of views have been expressed", talking about the proposal to expand the number of imperial family members by allowing men of the former princely houses to return to the imperial family as adoptees. Another idea that raised attention was allowing female imperial family members to retain the title of "princess" even after leaving the imperial family by marriage, so they could still take part in the royal family's activities despite losing the formal imperial family member status. As this idea has been supported by proponents and opponents of the creation of female-headed family branches, officials said that it could be a compromise if the discussion "remains inconclusive". As there were still controversial viewpoints concerning the possibility of allowing princesses to keep their royal status after marriage, government officials told the Yomiuri Shimbun that "the leadership of Prime Minister Yoshihiko Noda will be crucial to government reform of the system". However, although Noda once underlined the urgency of the matter, he has not made any public remarks on this issue for many months. This has led to skepticism among some government officials about whether the issue is a major priority for him. A senior official of the Imperial Household Agency voiced his concern, telling the Yomiuri Shimbun, "When considering the near future, the system needs to change." According to the Imperial Household Law, the empress as well as princesses are temporarily allowed to act on behalf of the emperor in state matters. That means that if female members of the imperial family were allowed to keep their royal status after marriage, they would be able to considerably alleviate the burden of the few male royals by taking over some of their duties."

==== 2014 ====
- On May 27, Princess Noriko of Takamado announced her engagement to commoner Kunimaro Senge. After her marriage on 5 October 2014, she left the imperial family.

==== 2016 ====
- On October 27, Prince Mikasa, one of the only five family members eligible to inherit the throne, died at age 100. In the previous 15 years only two children were born into the Imperial family while seven members left through death or marriage thereby reducing their number to 19.

==== 2017 ====
- On June 8, the Japanese parliament passed legislation that would allow Emperor Akihito to abdicate. The legislation also included a provision that asks parliament to consider allowing female royals to remain in the Imperial Family after their marriage. The legislation however did not address female succession, nor would the provision to abdicate apply to any successive emperor.
- In September, the Imperial Household Agency officially announced the engagement of Princess Mako. The agency later announced that the couple decided to postpone their marriage until at least 2020. Under the current system she would leave the Imperial Family and her name will change from Her Imperial Highness Princess Mako of Akishino to Mrs. Kei Komuro after her marriage.
- On December 1, it was announced that Emperor Akihito would abdicate at midnight JST on April 30, 2019. Crown Prince Naruhito succeeded him on May 1, 2019, beginning the Reiwa Imperial Era.

==== 2018 ====
- On August 12, Princess Ayako of Takamado announced her engagement to commoner Kei Moriya. After her marriage on October 29, 2018, she left the imperial family.

==== 2019 ====
- In January, the government announced that only male Imperial Family members would be allowed to participate at the key accession ceremony where Naruhito received the sacred regalia. Japan's sole female cabinet minister Satsuki Katayama was allowed to attend as government ministers are considered observers rather than participants.
- In April, the Government announced that it would only start internal discussions on the succession crisis after May 1. Nevertheless, Professor of Japanese History, Yuji Otabe from the Shizuoka University of Welfare criticized politicians for dodging the issue by saying that "they do not want to shoulder the responsibility" of having to deal with female succession.
- In July, the government planned to set up a panel by year-end to discuss how to achieve a stable imperial succession, including whether to allow female succession. Nevertheless, the panel, consisting of intellectuals from various fields, will not discuss changing the current order of succession. At that point in time the Conservative members of Prime Minister Shinzō Abe's Liberal Democratic Party (LDP) were opposed to having an empress on the throne, who could open up the line of succession to female members.

==== 2020 ====
- In January, it was reported that Deputy Chief Cabinet Secretary Kazuhiro Sugita would form an expert panel and begin debates on female succession, restoration of Imperial Family branches removed after WWII, and female retention of royal status after marriage. The debates were scheduled to begin after the Rikkoshi no Rei ceremony on April 19 when Crown Prince Akishino was to formally proclaim that he is first in line to the throne. The ceremony and the debates were postponed due to the COVID-19 pandemic in Japan.
- In August, then Defense Minister Tarō Kōno defended in an online program that matrilineal emperors, whose fathers have no bloodline connection with past emperors, should be considered to maintain stable succession of the Imperial Throne. He further proposed that it should be "possible that Imperial princesses (children or grandchildren of an emperor), including Princess Aiko (the daughter of Emperor Naruhito), could be accepted as the next empress. The Defense Minister also argued that under the current succession rules it would be difficult to allure any potential bride for the male heir, who would face enormous psychological pressure to become pregnant with a boy. Kono also questioned a proposal suggested by some conservative members of the LDP and others to reinstate members of former Imperial branch households to maintain patrilineal lineage succession, saying, "There will be a need to have discussions whether the people of Japan will truly accept reinstating those who were separated from the Imperial Family some 600 years ago."
- On November 8, the postponed Rikkoshi no Rei ceremony took place and Crown Prince Akishino was formally proclaimed as Emperor Naruhito's successor on Sunday. Prime Minister Yoshihide Suga was reported to state that the government will investigate measures to ensure stable succession but unnamed government officials wanted to shelve any decision as "premature". Public opinion on changes to imperial succession is divided with one source stating, "A decision cannot be made until we see whether Prince Hisahito will have a male child."
- On November 24, a proposal was raised to establish the courtesy title Kojo ("Imperial Woman" in English) for female members who leave the family after they marry commoners. Such a system would not require changes to Imperial Household Law but would give former princesses an official status in order to conduct public duties. Tokyo was also considering an idea to establish families headed by female members of the Imperial family by retaining their status after marriage and permit male descendants of former Imperial family members to enter the household by adoption. On November 26, Yuichiro Tamaki, leader of the Democratic Party for the People (DPP) and Kazuo Shii, chairman of the Japanese Communist Party (JCP), criticized the proposal due to its lack of addressing stable succession and any legality to recognize a female emperor.

==== 2021 ====
- On March 23, a panel was created to look into securing a stable line of succession in the Imperial Family with 20 experts being called to testify on their views. On July 27, 2021, the panel announced that the current line of succession to Crown Prince Akishino, then to Prince Hisahito, must remain unchanged and discussion of lineage beyond Hisahito's reign should be postponed. The panel planned to continue discussion on proposals to allow women to remain in the Imperial Family after marriage to commoners, and on allowing male members of former Imperial branches to be adopted into the Imperial Family.
- In September, it was considered to amend the Imperial Household Law and allow the 85-year old Prince Hitachi to adopt a male member of the collateral branches of the imperial family.
- On October 26, Princess Mako of Akishino married her fiancé and left the imperial family.
- On November 30, Crown Prince Fumihito criticized those who were critical of his daughter's marriage to Kei Komuro and that the family should be allowed the opportunity to refute false allegations made by the media.
- On December 22, the panel recommended that the succession of the throne be kept to male heirs. The panel said that options such as adopting single men and allowing female royals to keep their imperial status would require revising the 1947 Imperial Household Law.

==== 2022 ====
- On January 12, Prime Minister Fumio Kishida delivered the imperial succession report prepared by a government commission of experts to Lower House Speaker Hiroyuki Hosoda and Upper House President Akiko Santo. The report effectively set aside the question of how to maintain the imperial succession after Prince Hisahito, stating that the discussion on the matter is "still premature". The report also did not discuss whether to allow a daughter of the emperor or a son of the female line of the imperial family to take the throne. Thus, the report did not explore the question of how Japan can keep the imperial succession stable in the future. After the delivery of the report, the political parties were divided on the succession, with differing opinions.
- On January 13, the editorial board of Asahi Shimbun said that the imperial succession report "is unlikely to gain support from the public" and that "it is rather unlikely that the report will gain widespread support among Japanese people, today and in the future". Furthermore, the Newspapers stated that "the imperial system in a democratic society can only continue to exist if it is supported by a wide range of audiences. With the diversity of values among Japanese people expected to grow further in the coming years, it is questionable whether the proposals put forward by the group would ensure long-term stability in the activities and succession of the Imperial family".
- On January 19, the Japanese government met to address the decline in the number of members of the Imperial family. The LDP said it would address the issue of decreasing members of the Imperial family.
- On March 24, a group of experts, under pressure from the LDP, met to discuss the status of imperial princesses after marriage: they all agreed to keep the titles, treatment, residence in the palace and patronages to married princesses. In this way the princesses would still be able to take part in the activities of the imperial family. The group of experts, however, also agreed not to confer titles and treatments on the husbands and children of princesses.
- On June 28, Fushimi Hiroaki, a former member of the imperial family of the Fushimi-no-miya branch, said he was cautious about a possible return to the imperial family of the former collateral branches. But he said that he and his family "would have no choice but to follow if the emperor, as well as the government, tells us to return to the imperial family".
- On September 12, the editorial board of Mainichi Shimbun described the government's procrastination on the succession issue as "irresponsible", as "without taking any action, the number of Imperial Family members will only keep falling."

==== 2023 ====
- On February 26, Prime Minister Kishida said that the Diet would discuss a stable succession to the throne, as an issue that can no longer be postponed. LDP members were confused by his unexpected stance but they said they would address the issue. The Diet was supposed to have begun deliberation in January 2022 but as of August 2023 it had yet to take any action. Kishida made passing mention of constitutional and imperial succession reforms toward the end of his October 2023 policy speech to the Diet, which the Japan Times reported as an indication that "these matters remain peripheral for his administration".
- Surveys have shown 80% public support for a female succession. A manga by Yoshinori Kobayashi called Gōmanism Sengen Special: Aiko Tennō Ron (愛子天皇論) "Aiko as Empress") has led to debates and also been circulated amongst the members of the National Diet. On July 23, 2023, the "Making Aiko the Imperial Heir" event took place in Tokyo, which covered various topics, such as the possible nomination of Princess Aiko as Crown Princess of Japan. The event was attended by former members of the National Diet, politicians, and journalists from all over Japan. At the event was pointed out that Japan has already had eight empresses regnant (from Empress Suiko, who reigned 592–628, to Empress Go-Sakuramachi, who reigned 1762–1771) and therefore a possible ninth empress would receive a lot of support from the public. It has also been stated that there is no constitutional ban on the idea of a female emperor, and public opinion has been in favor of such an idea for some time. The possible succession to the throne if imperial princesses were allowed to enter the order of succession was also discussed at the event. Thus, the throne would be inherited by the direct descendants of the imperial lineage, without excluding the princesses.

The succession would therefore be as follows:

- Emperor Taishō (1879–1926)
  - Emperor Shōwa (1901–1989)
    - Mrs. Shigeko Higashikuni (1925–1961)
    - Sachiko, Princess Hisa (1927–1928)
    - Mrs. Kazuko Takatsukasa (1929–1989)
    - Mrs. Atsuko Ikeda (b. 1931)
    - Emperor Akihito (b. 1933)
      - Emperor Naruhito (b. 1960)
        - (1) Aiko, Princess Toshi (b. 2001)
      - (2) Fumihito, Crown Prince Akishino (b. 1965)
        - Mrs. Mako Komuro (b. 1991)
        - (3) Princess Kako of Akishino (b. 1994)
        - (4) Prince Hisahito of Akishino (b. 2006)
      - Mrs. Sayako Kuroda (b. 1969)
    - (5) Masahito, Prince Hitachi (b. 1935)
    - Mrs. Takako Shimazu (b. 1939)
  - Yasuhito, Prince Chichibu (1902–1953)
  - Nobuhito, Prince Takamatsu (1905–1987)
  - Takahito, Prince Mikasa (1915–2016)
    - Mrs. Yasuko Konoe (b. 1944)
    - Prince Tomohito of Mikasa (1946–2012)
      - (6) Princess Akiko of Mikasa (b. 1981)
      - (7) Princess Yōko of Mikasa (b. 1983)
    - Yoshihito, Prince Katsura (1948–2014)
    - Mrs. Masako Sen (b. 1951)
    - Norihito, Prince Takamado (1954–2002)
      - (8) Princess Tsuguko of Takamado (b. 1986)
      - Mrs. Noriko Senge (b. 1988)
      - Mrs. Ayako Moriya (b. 1990)
- On November 17, the LDP held its first session to ensure a stable imperial succession with new members and led by former prime minister Tarō Asō, brother of Princess Tomohito of Mikasa. Tarō Asō said that the problem of succession is very obvious and that it should be solved even at the cost of "revising and changing the Imperial Household Law, if necessary". During the meeting, two possible solutions were presented to allow a resolution of the problem:
  - the first solution would allow the imperial princesses to maintain their status after marriage. Members of the LDP have in fact stressed that Princesses Aiko and Kako are now old enough to be able to marry and that this possible option of solving the problem must be adopted immediately. However, it was also pointed out that former Imperial Princesses who are now married (such as Mako Komuro and Sayako Kuroda) will not be able to return to being members of the imperial family. Finally, it has been added that the spouses of the princesses who can remain in the imperial family after marriage (if this option is adopted) will not be able to have any imperial title or status, as well as any children. This solution is considered to be the most stable.
  - the second solution would provide for the return to the imperial family of the members of the former collateral branches. This solution is given slightly less consideration, as members of the LDP have questioned whether members of a former branch of the imperial family, now reduced to commoner citizens, will be able to readjust to life in the family and whether they will have the understanding and support of the people, which is very unlikely.
- In December, Fukushiro Nukaga, Speaker of the House of Representatives, asked senior leaders of the governing and opposition parties to gather views on a stable succession to the throne. He also asked the parties to consolidate views and called for discussions on imperial succession. He subsequently discussed the succession with some of the most important Japanese parties, such as the Komeito, the Constitutional Democratic Party (CDP), the Nippon Ishin no Kai, the JCP, the DPP and also met LDP vice president Tarō Asō.

==== 2024 ====
- On February 20, the CDP, led by former prime minister Yoshihiko Noda, held a meeting to address and determine a stable succession to the throne: the main topic addressed was the possible creation of female branches of the imperial family, allowing the princesses to be able to inherit the leadership of the branch of which they are already a part of and remain in the imperial family after their marriages. The need to address the problem of female family members immediately and quickly was stressed. It has also been suggested that the possible creation of branches led by the imperial princesses could lead to the future accession to the throne of a reigning empress.
- On March 12, the CDP met and approved a summary of issues compiled by the party's study committee on a stable succession to the throne. The committee stated that "it is very likely that women of the Imperial Family will leave [the Imperial Family] in the near future due to marriage" and that therefore the issue must be addressed immediately as an urgent matter. The committee stated the need to discuss the possibility of princesses being able to remain in the imperial family after marriage and becoming head of the family branch to which they belong. Regarding the adoption of male members from former imperial branches, the committee expressed doubts about this solution to the succession problem.
- On March 13, Komeito held a committee to discuss stable succession to the throne and discussed amendments to the 1947 Imperial Household Law, which could allow female members of the imperial family to remain in the imperial family after the marriage. Party vice president Kazuo Kitagawa, Chairman of the committee, said that: "Ensuring the number of members of the Imperial Family is an urgent matter for the moment" and said that the idea of allowing the family's princesses to remain in the imperial family even after marriage is "an urgent matter". Furthermore, according to him, husbands and children of princesses who remain in the imperial family after marriage "may not become members of the imperial family".
- On March 15, 2024, Shigetaka Yamazaki, who was involved in Emperor Akihito's abdication, was reappointed as an advisor to the Cabinet Secretariat with the task of formulating policies for a stable succession to the throne. According to the most important Japanese newspapers, his appointment marked the real beginning of discussions on imperial succession.
- On March 18, the LDP discussed the proposal for princesses to retain the status of members of the imperial family even after marriage. There were no negative opinions and the general consensus on allowing the imperial princesses (内親王, naishinnō) daughters and sisters of the emperor and other princesses (女王, joō) to remain in the family after marriage was totally favorable.
- On April 10, the editorial board of Mainichi Shimbun supported the proposal to allow female members of the Imperial family to retain their status after marriage. However the board cast doubt on the proposal to re-integrate former imperial branch family members back into the imperial family: they have lived as commoners for over 70 years, it was uncertain if the public would accept their reinstated status, and their consent to this change was not explored. Extending succession rights to women also needed to be debated as the other two proposals would only serve as temporary measures and would not provide stable imperial succession. It called for the government to "swiftly reach a conclusion" as the matter affected the structure of the nation and the future lives of the younger imperial family members.
- On April 28, a survey conducted by Kyodo News reported that 90% of respondents support the idea of an empress in the wake of a growing lack of male heirs.
- On May 7, an Asahi Shimbun editorial accused the LDP of not being serious about the sustainability of the imperial line. Both succession proposals were called "out of touch with public sentiment" and "fixated" on retaining male patrilineal succession. Even if adopted there would remain an "intense pressure to produce male heirs".
- On May 15, it was announced that political parties would begin discussions on the succession and things such as allowing women to retain their titles upon marriage and adopting male members of former branches of the imperial family.
- On May 17, the political parties began discussions on the succession debate. It remained to be seen whether the parties would be able to bridge divides before the parliamentary session ends on June 23.
- On June 1, the political parties agreed that women should keep their status upon marriage, but did not reach a conclusion on whether they can succeed to the throne, or as to the status of their husbands and children.
- On June 19, Emperor Naruhito said that the imperial family was running out of heirs and that there was an obvious solution but he refused to speak about the legal system in Japan.
- On September 27, the presidents of both the House of Representatives and the House of Councillors compiled each party's views on the form of stable succession to the throne and submitted them to Prime Minister Kishida: a general consensus was reached in favor of the possibility for female members of the family to remain in the imperial house after marriage. Regarding the adoption of male members from the former collateral branches, it was stated that "while there were a lot of positive opinions, there were also mixed opinions".
- On October 1, LDP leader Shigeru Ishiba became the new prime minister. He previously supported calls for a ruling empress in the imperial family. His party however holds to the bansei ikkei (unbroken male Imperial line) ideology, according to two academic foreign policy scholars. They criticized the proposal to allow Japanese princesses to remain in the imperial family after marriage as not well thought out: the husband would not be a member of the imperial family and thus would be eligible to run for elected political office. There still remains a complicated and extensive system of customs and rituals undertaken by the imperial court that were never reformed after the war. These are considered the private domain of the imperial family and could not be altered by legislation.
- On November 15, Princess Yuriko, widow of Prince Mikasa, died after months in poor health at St. Luke's International Hospital, aged 101. Her death reduced the number of members of the imperial family to 16.
- On November 23, the United Nations Committee on the Elimination of Discrimination Against Women requested the succession be looked at. Takeshi Iwaya showed displeasure at this, saying "It is not appropriate for the committee to raise this issue in relation to the Imperial House Law ... We will continue to request the deletion of the recommendation". Iwaya added that the committee raising this issue was "unacceptable for Japan". In its report issued on October 29, the committee recommended the law, which stipulates the Chrysanthemum Throne shall be "succeeded to by a male offspring in the male line belonging to the Imperial Lineage", be amended to "guarantee equality of women and men in the succession to the throne". The committee did not accept Japanese government requests to have the reference to the law deleted.
- On November 30, Crown Prince Akishino turned 59 and during a press conference for the occasion, he spoke about the succession, the laws, proposed changes to them, and the status of women in the imperial family and succession, saying: "Some in the Imperial Household Agency who are in responsible positions need to learn the [female Imperial members'] opinions about this". He went on to say that "The members of the Imperial family are real life people. The people in suitable positions in the Imperial Household Agency need to know how [change to the system] would affect the members and how they think about it".
- On December 12, Imperial Household Agency Grand Steward Yasuhiko Nishimura expressed "regrets" regarding the concerns and criticisms raised by Crown Prince Akishino during the press conference for his 59th birthday. He said "I regret that I did not have the opportunity to speak [with the female members of the Imperial family] in depth [regarding the succession debate]". Nishimura also expressed a willingness to take the lead in creating opportunities to hear the views of each female member of the imperial family regarding the possibility of allowing princesses to retain their status after marriage.

==== 2025 ====
- On January 29, the government announced that it would not provide funding to the UN Committee on the Elimination of Discrimination against Women that called for reviewing the Japanese succession laws. The committee raised concerns in 2024, with the Japanese government saying "It is not appropriate for the committee to raise this issue in relation to the Imperial House Law ... We will continue to request the deletion of the recommendation".
- On January 30, Japan halted UN panel funding for the panel that will to meet about the imperial succession. A statement released from the Japanese government said that they were "Ensuring that not even a portion of Japan's contributions is used for the committee will clarify the government's position".
- On January 31, members of the House of Representatives and of the House of Councillors met at the house of the speaker of the House of Representatives to hold a general meeting about the imperial family. The speaker of the House of Representatives, Fukushiro Nukaga, said he would like to reach a conclusion on measures to ensure the number of members of the imperial family during the current session of the Diet. There is a broad consensus among the parties on the idea that imperial female members retain their status after marriage. Additionally, the LDP did not approve the proposal to grant the status to imperial princesses' possible spouses and children, saying that this could lead to the birth of a "female Emperor". During a press conference after the meeting, Nukaga said: "The conflict does not represent the general will of the people. It is important that we respond to the expectations [of the people] with sincerity and determination to take responsibility for the future".
- On February 17, the representatives of each party in the House of Representatives and the House of Councillors met to discuss the ways to keep the number of members of the Imperial Family stable. A proposal was brought to allow women in the family to maintain their Imperial status even after marriage. On the issue of spouse and children, the LDP still maintains its position that they "will not have Imperial status", expressing concern that this could lead to a "female Emperor".
- On March 28, the House of Representatives and the House of Councillors published the minutes of the meeting held on the 10th concerning discussions between the ruling and opposition parties on the stability of the succession. Regarding the proposal to reintegrate male former princes from former branches into the imperial family through adoption, a government official expressed the opinion that the wishes of interested parties should be confirmed after the establishment of the system. Sumio Mabuchi, a member of the House of Representatives of the CDP, stressed the need to confirm "the intentions of the recipients". By contrast, Yamazaki Shigetaka, advisor to the Cabinet Secretariat, pointed out that adoption is currently prohibited by the actual Imperial Household Law, so "it is difficult to confirm this until the Diet has made a decision".
- On April 29, it was revealed that a plan to secure a sufficient number of imperial family members would be presented before the House of Councillors that summer. The idea of women retaining their title upon marriage was popular but opinions were divided on the status of their spouses and children. It was also revealed that the previous Thursday there was a meeting where most supported the idea to allow female imperial family members to choose whether to retain their status after marriage, with no objections to extending the condition to all of the emperor's female descendants on the male line. A document with the unmarried descendants from the male lines of the four former imperial branches will be handed out at a separate meeting with government experts on the imperial family.
- On May 4, a survey carried out by Yomiuri Shimbun newspaper revealed that 71% of respondents were concerned about the succession to the imperial throne. When asked about the permanence of princesses of the family after marriage, 55% said they were in favor, 7% against and 37% undecided. In contrast, the proposal to allow adoptions of male descendants from former imperial branches received a less clear response: 24% in favor, 20% against, and 55% undecided.
- On May 24, Mainichi News released a poll conducted between May 17 and 18, which stated that 70% of respondents approved female succession, 6% opposed it, 23% said either way and 1% chose not to answer.
- On June 3, both the LDP and CDP decided to postpone compiling a plan for stable female succession citing that they needed more time. The LDP was opposed to giving titles to the children and spouses of female members of the imperial family, saying that it could lead to an emperor from a female line, something the LDP is opposed to. Both parties agreed, however, that a woman should retain her title and status upon marriage. The CDP seemed positive on the possibility of an emperor from a female line. A proposition was put forth saying that the spouses and children of women should only gain a title if the husband is of a former branch of the imperial family. It was also suggested to put a plan on female marriage whilst retaining a title forward, ahead of other issues pertaining to the succession crisis, as all parties agreed on a woman retaining her status. The House of Representatives' speaker suggested to give it more time to look at the status of the spouse and children of a woman.
- On September 6, Prince Hisahito had his coming of age ceremony, thus increasing the number of adult members of the imperial family.
- On September 11, Tarō Asō, former vice president of the LDP, stated that it was his wish to secure the number of members of the Imperial Family and to finalize proposals regarding the imperial succession. It was pointed out that discussions regarding the matter were being held by the Diet. Proposals from other politicians were also heard, with Fumitake Fujita, co-leader of the Restoration Party stating, "We must proceed with measures to adopt the male descendants of former imperial branches into the Imperial Family", and also Yuichiro Tamaki, leader of the People's Democratic Party, affirming: "We must never let the tradition of succession through male descendants in the male line be broken"; Keiji Furuya, president of the Nippon Kaigi Diet Members' Association, specified that "It is the great responsibility of the current generation to preserve the tradition of male succession".
- On September 30, the number of branches of the imperial family increased from 4 to 5 as the Mikasa-no-miya branch was split: the Imperial Household Economic Council led by Prime Minister Ishiba, agreeing with Princess Tomohito of Mikasa and her daughters Princess Akiko and Princess Yōko, decided to appoint Princess Akiko as head of the Mikasa-no-miya branch, succeeding her grandmother Princess Mikasa, and Princess Tomohito as the head of the independent "Tomohito Mikasa-no-miya branch". Princess Yōko remains in the original household now carried on by her elder sister. It can be considered as an historical move, as it was not since the Meiji era that a princess had not led a branch of the imperial family on her own.
- On October 4, Sanae Takaichi won the 2025 LDP presidential election and was expected to become Japan's first female prime minister on October 15. Unlike the incumbent, Shigeru Ishiba, Takaichi is not in favour of female succession. However, in the past she has said "I'm not opposed to a female emperor. I'm opposed to a matrilineal emperor. ... In reality, I imagine it would be difficult for a woman to succeed to the throne. ... it would be better to restore the former imperial families to the imperial family." She later changed her position and is now opposed to female succession.
- On October 10, Komeito announced they would leave the coalition with the LDP. The vote to swear in Takaichi was delayed until October 20.
- On October 21, a vote in the House of Councillors was held and Sanae Takaichi was elected as Japan's first female prime minister.
- On December 24, Yasuhiko Nishimura was replaced as Grand Steward of the Imperial Household Agency by Buichiro Kuroda. Yasuhiko has previously commented on the Imperial succession debate, stating steps needed to be taken after "sufficient debate". Nishimura's successor, Buichiro Kuroda's opinions however are largely unknown, as he has never properly spoken on the matter.
- In December, Princess Aiko's growing popularity started to be noted by foreign media, such as the Associated Press, who reported on it as a sign of the increasing support among the public for an absolute primogeniture-based succession to the throne. The Princess' engagements carried out throughout the year – including a foreign visit to Laos, and other major appearances – helped her popularity to increase.
- On December 25, Buichiro Kuroda gave his first press conference as Grand Steward. He stated on the imperial succession "I would like to take various opportunities to explain the importance of this issue."
- Also on December 25, 2025, Yasuhiko Nishimura made a comment on the succession debate. He stated he was "extremely frustrated" that the National Diet was yet to come up with a stable succession plan, adding "It is a matter of deep regret. I earnestly hope that a proposal will be formulated soon that will gain the support of the majority of the people."

==== 2026 ====
- On February 18, Eisuke Mori (who became speaker of the house that same day) stressed the urgency of a stable succession plan, stating "This is an urgent matter that cannot be delayed. I will strive to achieve consensus within the legislature."
- On March 16, Prime Minister Takaichi said that she valued proposals made to ensure a stable succession and sufficient number of members of the imperial family. The LDP agreed to prioritising the adoption of former members of the imperial family from paternal branches; however, she said that she "respects" the two proposals given in 2021 (the previous stated adoption and also allowing women to keep their titles upon marriage). Regarding the LDP and JIP's agreement to prioritise the adoption of former members from paternal branches, she said "What should be listed first is a matter between political parties."
- On March 27, Junya Ogawa, leader of the Centrist Reform Alliance, stated during a press conference he wanted to see a female emperor "in my lifetime". He also stated that he wanted to ensure a stable succession.
- On April 2, JCP chairperson Tomoko Tamura expressed support for female members of the imperial family to ascend the throne.
- On April 14, Prime Minister Takaichi brought up succession to the throne during a 20-minute speech, stating: "Revision to the Imperial House Law is urgently needed." She once again stated her favour towards strictly male only and male line only succession: "Our top priority will be the proposal to use the adoption system to restore the Imperial family status of male descendants in the paternal line."
- On April 15, The Asahi Shimbun released an editorial calling on the government with a need for "thorough" discussions by both the ruling and opposition parties. They also stated that Prime Minister Takaichi's stance on succession, specifically her having a preference for adoption of former members of the Imperial House who are male is like "putting the cart before the horse if the rush to push through the adoption proposal was intended to eliminate the possibility in the future of a female emperor or matrilineal emperor."
- On April 16, it was announced that a diet will be formed to view the laws of succession and come up with plans to support stable succession. Meetings were already held, but the Centrist Reform Alliance (CRA) was not in attendance as the party failed to reach a consensus of what they support. The speaker of the house requested they reach a consensus before the next meeting in May. That same day, Prime Minister Takaichi indicated that she would approve a revision to the Imperial House law that would allow women to keep their titles after marriage. The same report also includes adopting former members of the imperial family of the male line back into the imperial family. When the CDP mentioned polls showing most Japanese people in favour of female succession, Takaichi said "The line of Imperial succession up to Prince Hisahito, the eldest son of Crown Prince Akishino, 'must not be disrupted.'"
- On April 27, LDP lawmakers submitted a proposal on imperial succession. The lawmakers opposed women keeping their titles after marriage stating "Our position is strictly in favour of 'patrilineal succession'; the existence of female imperial households or a female Emperor must not be permitted. We place our hopes in the leadership of Prime Minister Takaichi and Chief Cabinet Secretary Kihara." They also proposed marrying male line descendants of former imperial family branches into the imperial family through women. Under this proposal, the men would be adopted as princes and would marry the women already in the imperial family.
- On May 7, the CRA made its official party stance on female succession after much deliberation. They backed the proposal of the adoption of former male members of the imperial family in the male line. They also backed another proposal that allows women to keep their titles upon marriage, but debate remains in the party over the status of their husbands and children. Internally, while Komeito supports the adoption proposal, the CDP does not, instead preferring female succession.
- Between April 29 and May 7, the Shūkan Bunshun conducted one of the largest polls on female succession via their magazine. Of the 25,000 responses, 93% were in favour of a female emperor, and 88.9% were in favour of a female line (matrilineal) emperor.
- On May 28, a draft revision to the Imperial Household Law was postponed until May, with it being reiterated that little disagreement existed on the topic of allowing women to retain their titles upon marriage.
- On May 29, opposition parties such as the JCP and Social Democratic Party, called for discussions on female succession to be completely restarted, citing the prime minister's lack of consideration for a female emperor or an emperor in the female line.
- On June 3, the LDP agreed that the plan to adopt men of former male line branches of the imperial family should be done "on their free will" meaning anyone adopted into the imperial family will have to be 15 or older due to Japanese law which would allow them to consent to the adoption.
- On June 5, 2026, the speakers and deputy speakers of both houses of government have compiled a proposal on succession to the throne:

1. Imperial women are allowed retain their titles upon marriage.

We believe that, as it is consistent with the history of the Imperial Family and in light of considerations such as the continuity of public activities, the Imperial House Law should be amended and work should proceed on the specific design of the system. Furthermore, given that Their Imperial Highness the Imperial Princesses (Naishinnō) and Their Imperial Highnesses the Princesses (Joō) have lived their lives under the current system whereby they would lose their imperial status upon marriage, certain considerations should be made as transitional measures, such as respecting their wishes regarding whether or not to retain their status as members of the Imperial Family.

2. That former male members in the paternal branches of the imperial family be readmitted into the imperial house, and that the succession from Fumihito to Hisahito not be disrupted.

The specific framework of the system shall be designed to apply to male-line descendants of the male members of the so-called former 11 Imperial Houses.

These former male members will not have succession rights and shall only be adopted upon their expressed consent. Later the summary stated "The Government shall solemnly accept this 'consensus of the legislature', immediately commence drafting the bill, carry out the drafting work in good faith, report to the Vice-Speakers of the House of Representatives and the House of Councillors in advance once the outline of the bill has been finalised, and, once the draft bill has been completed, explain it to all parties and parliamentary groups at a plenary meeting. We strongly urge the Government to submit the bill to the Diet without delay once confirmation has been obtained." The proposal fails to bring up the titles of the spouses and children of imperial women, of which parties remain divided. The proposal states that parties should go over the proposal and it should be re-evaluated as a non permanent solution, as division still remains on female inheritance. Due to disagreements between parties, no legislature may be drawn during the remainder of the current diet session which ends on June 22.

- On June 8, most parties supported the revision to the Imperial Household Law, and a draft is expected to be put forward. Some opposition still remained and no agreements have been made on whether the consort to a princess or her children would get titles, and the parties would meet again to have their opinions considered before any legislature is finalised. There is hope to pass legislature before July 17.
- On June 9, the speaker of the house stated that if a male is born to any of the former male members of the imperial family who are adopted back in, he will have succession rights. Many opposition parties have disagreed with this statement, and it is expected to lead to a delay in legislature, with the Centrist Reform Alliance expected to oppose the adoption of former male members in the patrilineal line at a party meeting on June 10.
- On June 10, the speaker of the house compiled proposals on imperial succession to be given to Prime Minister Takaichi, who will be asked to compose a draft. The Centrist Reform Alliance, which did not express any opinions on the 8th, did agree to the marriage proposal, but remains cautious of the adoption proposal. The proposals compiled by the speaker of the house fail to mention the status of the consorts and children of the female members of the imperial family, and division still remains. That same day, opposition parties such as the CDP and the CRA of which the CDP is apart of, released their "consensus" on imperial succession following the plan of the LDP having reached "the consensus of the legislature." (according to the LDP). They reached the consensus that imperial succession and the changes to the Imperial Household Law should focus on the female members already in the imperial family. The adoption proposal is to be "discussed again".
- On June 11, Emperor Naruhito was asked his opinions on the recent parliamentary discussions related to imperial succession.

I hope that these measures will gain the understanding of the people.

Adding he would "refrain from making specific references to the system." He also said that "the fundamental nature of the imperial family and its activities lies in constantly wishing for the happiness of the people and sharing their joys and sorrows."

- On June 22, the draft containing the revision to the Imperial Household Law was postponed and will not be submitted to the house for adoption into law.
- On June 26, the LDP finalized the full details on the Imperial Household Law revision which will allow former male members of the imperial family to be adopted in. That same day, [Chief Cabinet Secretary Minoru Kihara indicated that former male members adopted into the imperial family will have the current Imperial Household Law applied to them, meaning their descendants will be eligible for succession. It was revealed women's consorts and children will not receive titles upon their marriage to a princess, but will instead gain a separate family register while the princess will remain royal.
- On June 29, the government planned to enact its revisions as soon as the 30th of the same month, however deliberations may continue due to intense opposition. The plan is intensely criticised as the government did not receive the consensus of the party leaders and diet, with a representative of the CDP stating "The legislative branch is not a slave to the Cabinet."
- On June 30, the cabinet reportedly approved a bill that called for revising laws to ensure a sustainable imperial family system.
- On July 10, the House of Representatives passed the "Imperial Family Code" bill, amending the rights of succession of the Japanese imperial family. A protest took place outside the National Diet in the evening, with about 27,000 people attending. They protested, among other things, the revisions to the Imperial Household Law.
- On July 15, the vote in the House of Councillors on the revisions to the Imperial Household Law was postponed with no consensus reached during the debates. The vote took place again on the 16th.
- On July 16, the revisions were approved by a special committee of the House of Councillors.
- On July 17, the revisions to the Imperial Household Law were passed by the House of Councillors, completing their enactment.
- On July 21, the government decided that the revised law would be promulgated on July 24 and would take effect three months after promulgation.
- On July 24, the revised Imperial Household Law was formally promulgated as Law No. 66 of 2026 and was scheduled to take effect on October 24. It was the first substantive amendment to the main provisions of the current law since its enactment in 1947.
- On August 13, Crown Prince Akishino stated that he had mixed feelings about the revised law, acknowledging that the resolution of imperial succession in the near future was a difficult question to answer.
- On September 6, Prince Hisahito turned 20 with attention centering on his potential succession to the throne.
- On October 9, reports from a poll in Japan suggest 72% of the population are supportive of a female emperor.
- On October 24, the revisions to the Imperial Household Law took effect.
