= Princess Masako: Prisoner of the Chrysanthemum Throne =

2006 book by journalist Ben Hills

- Author: Ben Hills
- Publication date: 2006
- ISBN: 1585425680

Princess Masako: Prisoner of the Chrysanthemum Throne is a controversial 2006 book by Australian investigative journalist Ben Hills. Billed as "The Tragic True Story of Japan's Crown Princess", the book drew criticism from the Imperial Household Agency and the government of Japan over its supposed inaccuracies, and Hills claims to have received death threats. The English version was published in Japan in September 2007.

A translation was to be published in Japan by the country's largest publisher, Kodansha. But Kodansha demanded that some of the contents which was pointed out by Imperial household to be revised due to "substantial number of factual errors". Hills refused and Kodansha, in response, decided not to publish the book. A small publishing company, Dai-san Shokan, later published the book in August 2007, along with a companion book by investigative journalist Mineo Noda titled The Truth about 'Princess Masako' – Mystery of the Contents Which Were Censored, which claims to reveal the ways the Japanese establishment tried to prevent Hills' book being published.

== The book ==
The author states that the book was written after over a year of research in Japan, Australia, United States and England, and interviews with friends, teachers and colleagues of the Crown Prince and Crown Princess.

Among the claims made in the book are that Masako was forced to abandon her studies at Oxford because her thesis topic was too controversial; that the Imperial Household Agency opposed the marriage from the start and has bullied the Princess, leading to a nervous breakdown; that Princess Aiko was conceived as a result of in vitro fertilisation treatments; and that Masako is suffering from clinical depression.

== Reactions ==
On 13 February 2007, the Japanese Foreign Ministry held a press conference in Tokyo at which it denounced the book as "insulting to the Japanese people and the Imperial family", alleging "disrespectful descriptions, distortions of facts, and judgemental assertions with audacious conjectures and coarse logic". Press conferences at which the book was denounced were also held by Japan's ambassadors to Australia and the US.

Japan's leading media, including the Asahi, Mainichi, Yomiuri and Nihon Keizai newspapers all rejected advertisements for the book.

== Kodansha ==
Publisher Kodansha was slated to release a Japanese translation in 2006, which was to contain 149 changes. According to Hills, these included:

- Removal of all references to IVF treatment (story originally broken by The Times)
- Alteration of references from "depression" to "adjustment disorder" – the Imperial Household Agency's official terminology
- Deletion of all references to the controversial Yasukuni Shrine
- Deletion of references to yakuza
- Removal of statements about the allegedly strained relationship between the Emperor and Empress and the Crown Prince and Princess

On learning of what he termed the "bowdlerization" of his book, Hills demanded a disclaimer be placed in the preface. Ultimately, however, Kodansha decided not to publish the book.

Kazunobu Kakishima, a Kodansha editor, says that the book was cancelled because Hills refused to acknowledge making a "substantial number of factual errors". Hills says, "We have repeatedly asked the bureaucrats for the list of 'more than 100 errors' that they claim to have found. There has been no response, other than to state that the Empress Michiko is not a 'stick-thin, grey-haired wraith'."

== See also ==
- The King Never Smiles
