= Buichiro Kuroda =

Japanese official

- 黒田武一郎
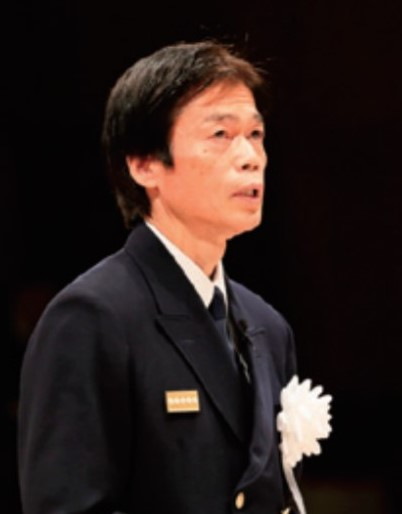

Grand Steward of the Imperial Household
- Incumbent
- Assumed office December 24, 2025
- Monarch: Naruhito
- Vice Steward: Yoshimi Ogata
- Preceded by: Yasuhiko Nishimura

Vice Grand Steward of the Imperial Household Agency
- In office December 19, 2023 – 24 December 2025
- Monarch: Naruhito
- Grand Steward: Yasuhiko Nishimura
- Preceded by: Kenji Ikeda
- Succeeded by: Yoshimi Ogata

Personal details
- Born: February 20, 1960 (age 66) Amagasaki, Hyōgo Prefecture
- Education: University of Tokyo

Buichiro Kuroda (Japanese: 黒田武一郎, Hepburn: Kuroda Buichiro; born February 20, 1960) is a Japanese official who serves as Grand Steward of the Imperial Household Agency since December 2025.

== Early life and education ==
Kuroda was born in Amagasaki, Hyōgo Prefecture, graduating from Nada High School. He graduated from the University of Tokyo.

== Early career ==
Kuroda became part of the Ministry of Home Affairs in 1982, and later the Ministry of Internal Affairs and Communications. He has held many governmental positions such as Director General of the Local Public Finance Bureau, Commissioner of the Fire and Disaster Management Agency, and Administrative Vice Minister of Internal Affairs and Communications. During the Tohokushinsha Film and Ministry of Internal Affairs and Communications scandal, Kuroda was one of the people who received an ethics warning. He also received a warning due to entertainment he had received from the Nippon Telephone and Telegraph, in violation of the ethics code. He resigned from his posts in 2022.

== Vice Grand Steward ==
In 2023, Kuroda was appointed Vice Steward of the Imperial Household Agency.

In April 2024, he made a statement commenting on the Imperial family reaching a million followers on Instagram, stating "It is a reminder of the strong public interest in the imperial family. I'm filled with a renewed sense of responsibility". He went on to comment "We will continue to refine our public relations approach, engaging a wider audience, including younger generations".

In June of that same year, Kuroda was the first official of the Imperial Household Agency to announce that Empress Emerita Michiko had contracted COVID-19, at a regular press conference.

In 2025, Yasuhiko Nishimura announced his retirement as Grand Steward, with Buichiro Kuroda to succeed him on December 24.

== Grand Steward of the Imperial Household Agency ==
Kuroda became Grand Steward on the 24th as planned. His vice grand steward is Yoshimi Ogata.

On 25 December 2025, Kuroda gave his first press conference. "I have been given a job of great responsibility. I will do my best, even if my abilities are small." He also discussed the imperial succession and the debate surrounding it, stating "I would like to take various opportunities to explain the importance of this issue."

When the revisions of the Imperial Household Law were passed, allowing men of imperial descent to be adopted into the main family, Kuroda stated he would take careful measures to ensure the privacy of the people involved.
