= Yasuhiko Nishimura =

Japanese Imperial official

- 西村 泰彦
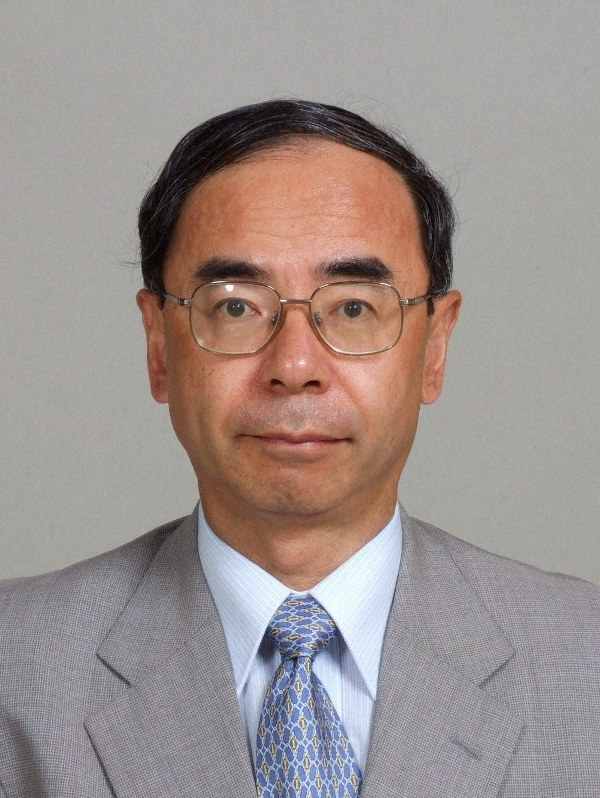
- Nishimura in 2014

Grand Steward of the Imperial Household
- In office 17 December 2019 – 24 December 2025
- Monarch: Naruhito
- Preceded by: Shin'ichirō Yamamoto
- Succeeded by: Buichiro Kuroda

Personal details
- Born: 29 June 1955 (age 71) Toba City, Mie Prefecture
- Education: University of Tokyo

Yasuhiko Nishimura (Japanese: 西村 泰彦, Hepburn: Nishimura Yasuhiko; born 29 June 1955) is a Japanese official who served as the Grand Steward of the Imperial Household from 2019 until 2025.

== Early life and career ==
Yasuhiko Nishimura was born in Toba, Mie. He was educated at the Faculty of Law, University of Tokyo, graduating in March 1979.

After graduating, Nishimura joined the National Police Agency, holding many roles such as chief of the Security Bureau and superintendent general of the Tokyo Metropolitan Police.

At a 2010 conference, Yasuhiko, responding to a question by Hiroshi Nakai about right-wing civic groups, asking if it was appropriate to call them extreme right, he expressed that "They are not engaged in violent destructive activities, so the term extreme right-wing does not fit." He would later retire from this role in 2014. In the same year, he would become the Cabinet Crisis Management Officer. In 2016, he became Vice Grand Steward of the Imperial Household.

== Grand Steward of the Imperial Household ==
Yasuhiko was appointed on 17 December 2019 as Grand Steward of the Imperial Household. The beginning of his role as Grand Steward coincided with the COVID-19 pandemic. Because it was so close to the 2020 Summer Olympics, the event was postponed until 2021. Yasuhiko released a statement about the Olympics saying "From what I gather, the emperor is concerned about holding the Tokyo Olympic and Paralympic Games, for which he serves as honorary president, while people are voicing anxiety over whether it will lead to a spread of infections,". To which the then Prime Minister of Japan, Yoshihide Suga, said that "Nishimura had purely voiced his personal views." An argument was also made against his comments, saying, "The Japanese Emperor is not allowed to engage politically according to the Constitution. He must make sure to observe it."

In April 2021, Yasuhiko also precised over the marriage of then Princess Mako of Akishino, to Kei Komuro. He said that a previous statement she made on her marriage was "Explained very well" but also said that "The public will make their own assessment". The marriage later went through. After Kei Komuro released documents explaining his mother's financial issues, which were put into question and quite controversial, Yasuhiko said that "This document has allowed me to understand the facts and circumstances." In 2024, he went on to speak about the Japanese imperial succession debate by saying that it was an "Extremely important matter" and "Steps will be taken after sufficient debate has occurred."

In December 2025, Yasuhiko announced his retirement, effective on December 24, 2025, and he was succeeded by vice steward, Buichiro Kuroda.

== Post-Grand Stewardship ==
Upon his retirement, Nishimura received flowers from employees of the Imperial Household Agency. He commented on the Imperial succession stating he was "extremely frustrated" that a stable succession plan had not yet been drawn up by the National Diet. He also said "It is a matter of deep regret. I earnestly hope that a proposal will be formulated soon that will gain the support of the majority of the people."
