= Shōichi Fujimori =

Grand Steward of the Japanese Imperial Household Agency (1926–2016)

- 藤森 昭一

Grand Steward of the Imperial Household Agency
- In office 14 June 1988 – 19 January 1996
- Monarchs: Hirohito; Akihito
- Preceded by: Tomohiko Tomita
- Succeeded by: Sadame Kamakura

Deputy Chief Cabinet Secretary (Administrative affairs)
- In office 27 November 1982 – 6 November 1987
- Prime Minister: Yasuhiro Nakasone
- Preceded by: Kyūjirō Okina
- Succeeded by: Nobuo Ishihara

Personal details
- Born: 26 December 1926 Matsumoto, Nagano, Japan
- Died: 25 June 2016 (aged 89) Shibuya, Tokyo, Japan
- Education: University of Tokyo

Shōichi Fujimori (Japanese: 藤森昭一) (26 December 1926 – 25 June 2016) was a Japanese bureaucrat who served as Grand Steward of the Imperial Household Agency (1988–1996). He was born in Matsumoto, Nagano Prefecture.

== Biography ==
Shōichi Fujimori was born on 26 December 1926, to a farmer's family on the outskirts of Matsumoto in Nagano Prefecture. Born the first day after the Emperor Shōwa acceded to the throne, his name Shōichi combined the first character of Showa (昭) with the character for one (一). Fujimori attended Matsumoto Higher School and was mobilised to work at a munitions factory during the Pacific War. He studied law at the University of Tokyo and joined the Ministry of Health and Welfare when he graduated in 1950.

At the time when the Isewan Typhoon struck Mie Prefecture, Fujimori was deeply involved in the disaster response, serving on secondment as chief of the Health and Welfare division in the Mie Prefectural Government. He was seconded to the Cabinet Secretariat as Chief Cabinet Counsellor (首席内閣参事官, Shuseki Naikaku Sanjikan) in July 1973. When Prime Minister Takeo Miki was attacked during the funeral of Eisaku Satō, Fujimori tackled and subdued the assailant. Fujimori was later transferred to the Environment Agency in July 1979, and successively served as chief of the Nature Conservation Bureau and chief of the Planning and Coordination Bureau, before being appointed administrative vice minister of the Environment in July 1981.

Fujimori left the post when he was appointed Deputy Chief Cabinet Secretary for administrative affairs under the Nakasone Cabinet in November 1982. He served for almost five years until Prime Minister Nakasone stepped down in November 1987.

Fujimori first entered the Imperial Household Agency as Vice Grand Steward in April 1988. He was promoted to Grand Steward two months later. Fujimori announced the death of Emperor Hirohito on 7 January 1989, at 7:55 AM. He oversaw the Emperor's funeral and the ascension of Emperor Akihito as Grand Steward. He continued to serve until 1996.

After retiring he served as President of the Japanese Red Cross Society until 2005, and was honorary president afterwards. Shōichi Fujimori died of sepsis on 25 June 2016.

== Honour ==
- Grand Cordon of the Order of the Rising Sun.

=== Foreign honour ===
- Malaysia : Honorary Commander of the Order of Loyalty to the Crown of Malaysia (P.S.M.) (1991)

== Bibliography ==
- 荻上悦子著「春寂寥 旧制松本高等学校人物誌」 2008年

Government offices
Preceded by Kyūjirō Okina	Deputy Chief Cabinet Secretary (Administrative affairs); 1982–1987	Succeeded by Nobuo Ishihara
Court offices
Preceded by Satoru Yamamoto	Vice Grand Steward of the Imperial Household; 1988	Succeeded by Ban Miyao
Preceded by Tomohiko Tomita	Grand Steward of the Imperial Household; 1988–1996	Succeeded by Sadame Kamakura
Non-profit organization positions
Preceded by Masayoshi Yamamoto	President of the Japanese Red Cross Society; 1996–2005	Succeeded by Tadateru Konoe
