= Yoshitami Matsudaira =

Viscount Yoshitami Matsudaira Senior Second Rank
- 松平 慶民
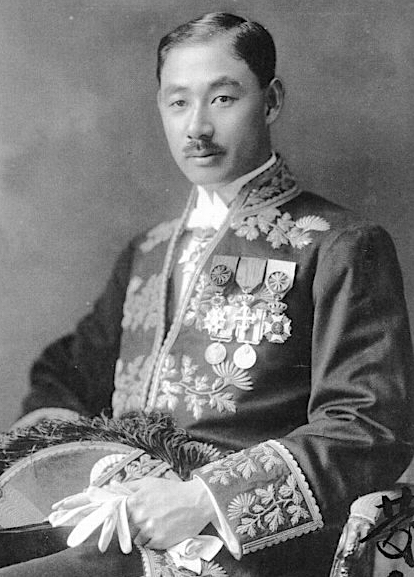

Grand Steward of the Imperial Household Office
- In office 3 May 1947 – 5 June 1948
- Monarch: Hirohito
- Preceded by: Himself (as Minister of the Imperial Household)
- Succeeded by: Michiji Tajima

Minister of the Imperial Household
- In office 16 January 1946 – 2 May 1947
- Monarch: Hirohito
- Preceded by: Sōtarō Ishiwata
- Succeeded by: Himself (as Grand Steward of the Imperial Household Office)

Personal details
- Born: 13 March 1882
- Died: 18 July 1948 (aged 66)
- Parent: Matsudaira Yoshinaga (father)
- Relatives: Yoshichika Tokugawa (brother)
- Education: Balliol College, Oxford

Viscount Yoshitami Matsudaira was a Japanese bureaucrat. He served as the last Minister of the Imperial Household (now the Imperial Household Agency) from 1946 to 1947. He spent 12 years of his youth in England and was educated at Balliol College, Oxford.

== Family ==
- Father:Matsudaira Yoshinaga
- Adoptive father: Yasutaka Matsudaira
- Adoptive father-in-law:Katsunosuke Inoue
- Son:Nagayoshi Matsudaira
- Cousins:Tokugawa Iesato and Tokugawa Satotaka

== Bibliography ==
- 霞会館華族家系大成編輯委員会『平成新修旧華族家系大成』（霞会館、1996年）

Preceded by	Grand Steward of the Imperial Household Office; 1947–1948	Succeeded by Tajima Michiji
