= Ben Hills =

Australian journalist and author

- Born: 1942; Grassington, North Yorkshire, England
- Died: 10 June 2018 (aged 75–76); Sydney, New South Wales, Australia
- Occupations: Journalist, author

Ben Hills (1942 – 10 June 2018) was an Australian freelance journalist and author.

== Early life and career ==
Hills was born in Grassington, England and migrated with his family to Australia in 1959. He worked on various regional newspapers before being hired as an investigative reporter by The Age in Melbourne in 1969. He worked for The Age and The Sydney Morning Herald as a London-based foreign correspondent in the mid-1970s then as a Hong-Kong based publisher during the 1980s. Returning to Melbourne, Hills became assistant editor of The Age. He spent four years as a producer for 60 Minutes. In 1991 he received the Walkley Award for investigative reporting. Hills became the Fairfax Japan correspondent from 1992 to 1995 and then lived in Sydney. He wrote six books, and after leaving Fairfax worked as a freelancer for SBS TV and other media outlets.

Hills died from cancer in Sydney on 10 June 2018.

== Bibliography ==
- Stop the presses: how greed, incompetence (and the internet) wrecked Fairfax. ABC Books, Sydney, 2014.
- Breaking news: the golden age of Graham Perkin Scribe, Melbourne 2010. About the Australian editor Graham Perkin.
- The island of the ancients: the secrets of Sardinia's Centenarians Murdoch Books, Sydney 2008
- Princess Masako: Prisoner of the Chrysanthemum Throne Tarcher/Penguin, New York 2006
- Japan behind the lines Sydney : Hodder Headline, Melbourne 1996
- Blue murder: two thousand doomed to die, the shocking truth about Wittenoom's deadly dust Sun Books, Melbourne 1989
