= Bansei ikkei =

Bansei Ikkei (Japanese: 万世一系, lit. 'single unbroken line spanning ten thousand generations') means an eternal continuation of lineage, often referring mainly to a succession of hereditary aristocratic families, such as the Imperial family. In particular, bansei ikkei often refers to the claim that the bloodline of the Japanese Emperor has never been interrupted since Emperor Jimmu.

== History ==
Bansei ikkei myth was promoted by scholars of ancient Japanese thought and culture, including Motoori Norinaga, as a concept emphasizing Japan's superiority over foreign countries.

Article 1 of the Constitution of the Empire of Japan, it was written as follows: "The Empire of Japan shall be reigned over and governed by a line of Emperors unbroken for ages eternal." (Japanese: 大日本帝󠄁國ハ萬世一系ノ天皇之ヲ統治ス)

In 1940, figures inside and outside the Japanese government held the most comprehensive and grand national celebration, the 2,600th anniversary celebration of the Empire of Japan. The Japanese defined themselves, their country, and their Empire through the celebration of Emperor Jimmu's accession in 660 B.C. This celebration symbolized the culmination of the bansei ikkei ideology, which was the centerpiece of modern Japanese identity until the legitimacy of imperial worship was bruised by defeat in 1945.

== Other ==
Article 1 of the Principles of the Constitution, promulgated during the Qing dynasties in 1908, includes:

大清皇帝統治大清帝國，萬世一系，永永尊戴。
The Emperor of the Grand Qing Dynasty shall rule supreme over the Grand Qing Empire 'for ten thousand generations in succession', and be honored forever.

The word 萬世一系 (simplified Chinese: 万世一系; pinyin: Wànshì yīxì) appeared because this constitution, enacted by Qing, was influenced by the Constitution of the Empire of Japan.

== See also ==
- Emperor of Japan#Succession
- Genealogy
- Japanese imperial succession debate
- Monarchism#Japan
