= Tomohiko Tomita =

Tomohiko Tomita (富田 朝彦, Tomita Tomohiko, July 3, 1920 – November 13, 2003) was a Japanese official who served as Grand Steward of the Imperial Household Agency from May 1978 to June 1988).

Tomita graduated from the University of Tokyo. Prior to his appointment as Grand Steward he was a senior police officer who served as chief of the Security Bureau of the National Police Agency, Deputy Superintendent General of the Tokyo Metropolitan Police Department and director of the Cabinet Research Office.

Government offices
Preceded by Hiromori Kawashima; Fujio Hara (acting)	Director of the Cabinet Research Office; 1973-1974	Succeeded by Masarō Watanabe
Court offices
Preceded by Takeshi Usami	Grand Steward of the Imperial Household Agency; 1978–1988	Succeeded by Shōichi Fujimori

== See also ==
- Ministry of the Imperial Household
