= Noriyuki Kazaoka =

Noriyuki Kazaoka (Japanese: 風岡典之) (born September 15, 1946) was a Japanese official who served as Grand Steward of the Imperial Household Agency from 1 Jun 2012 – 26 Sep 2016. He was born in Niigata Prefecture and worked at the Ministry of Construction.

== Honours ==
- Netherlands: Grand Officer of the Order of Orange-Nassau (29 October 2014)

Preceded by Shingo Haketa	Grand Steward of the Imperial Household Agency; 2012–2016	Succeeded by Shinichiro Yamamoto
