= Empress Masako =

Empress of Japan since 2019

Masako
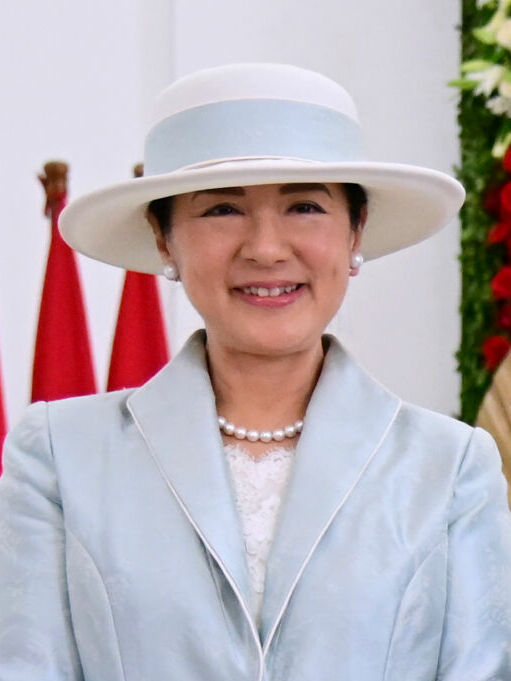
- Masako in 2023

Empress consort of Japan
- Tenure: 1 May 2019 – present
- Enthronement: 22 October 2019
- Born: Masako Owada (小和田雅子); 9 December 1963 (age 62); Minato, Tokyo, Japan
- Spouse: Naruhito (m. 1993)
- Issue: Aiko, Princess Toshi
- House: Imperial House of Japan (by marriage)
- Father: Hisashi Owada
- Mother: Yumiko Egashira

Masako (Japanese: 雅子; born Masako Owada (小和田雅子, Owada Masako); 9 December 1963) is Empress of Japan as the wife of Emperor Naruhito.

Born in Minato, Tokyo, Masako was educated at Belmont High School in Massachusetts, United States, before attending Harvard College. She also studied law at the University of Tokyo and international relations at Balliol College, Oxford. After completing her studies, she worked for Japan's Ministry of Foreign Affairs as a diplomat.

Masako met Crown Prince Naruhito in 1986. They married in 1993 and their only child, Aiko, Princess Toshi, was born in 2001. The birth of Princess Aiko fueled the ongoing Japanese imperial succession debate, which had led some politicians to favor rescinding the agnatic primogeniture imposed by the Allies of World War II on the Constitution of Japan. However, with the birth of a son to Naruhito's brother, Fumihito, in 2006, no amendments were made and Princess Aiko remains ineligible to inherit the throne.

The pressure to produce a male heir affected Masako's health. She was diagnosed with adjustment disorder in 2004, which forced her to withdraw from public life periodically. As crown princess and later empress, Masako has accompanied her husband on official visits abroad and at ceremonies in the imperial court.

== Early life and education ==
Masako Owada (小和田雅子, Owada Masako) was born on 9 December 1963 at Toranomon Hospital in Toranomon, Minato, Tokyo. She is the eldest daughter of Yumiko Egashira (b. 1938) and Hisashi Owada (b. 1932), a senior diplomat and former president of the International Court of Justice. She has two younger sisters, twins named Setsuko and Reiko (b. 1966).

Masako went to live in Moscow with her parents when she was two years old, where she attended Detskiy Sad (kindergarten in Russian) No. 1127 daycare. At the age of five, Masako's family moved to New York City, where she attended kindergarten at Public School 81 in Riverdale.

In 1971, the Owadas returned to Japan, moving in with Masako's maternal grandparents in Meguro while Hisashi returned to the Foreign Ministry office. She entered Futaba Gakuen, a private Catholic girls' school in Den-en-chōfu, Tokyo. Established by the Congregation of the Holy Infant Jesus in 1872, Masako's mother and maternal grandmother had graduated from this school as well. It was here that Masako learned to play piano and tennis, joined a handicrafts club, and became interested in animals, tending several after school and deciding to become a veterinarian. Masako also studied her fourth and fifth languages, French and German. With a school friend, Masako revived Futaba's softball team, serving as third base and after three years bringing her team to the district championships.

In 1979, her second year of senior high school, Masako and her family moved to the United States and settled in the Boston suburb of Belmont, Massachusetts, where her father became a guest professor of international law at Harvard University's Center for International Affairs. In 1981, she graduated from Belmont High School, where she was president of the National Honor Society and participated in the school's math team and French club. Masako joined the school's softball team and won a Goethe Society award for her German poetry. Masako participated in a production of M*A*S*H.

Masako's father was posted to Moscow after her high school graduation, but Masako remained in Boston to continue her education; In 1981 she enrolled at Harvard College, where she chaired the school's Japan Society, "became quite close friends with the then Japanese consul in Boston, and volunteered as a kind of self-appointed diplomat and cultural ambassador" in the wake of mounting Japan–United States trade tension. Masako liked to ski and traveled overseas during vacations, staying with a host family in France and studying at the Goethe-Institut. Masako is fluent in English and in French, which she learned in 1983 at the University Center for French Studies at Université Grenoble Alpes. Masako worked with Jeffrey Sachs to obtain a B.A. magna cum laude in economics in March 1985.

== Professional career ==
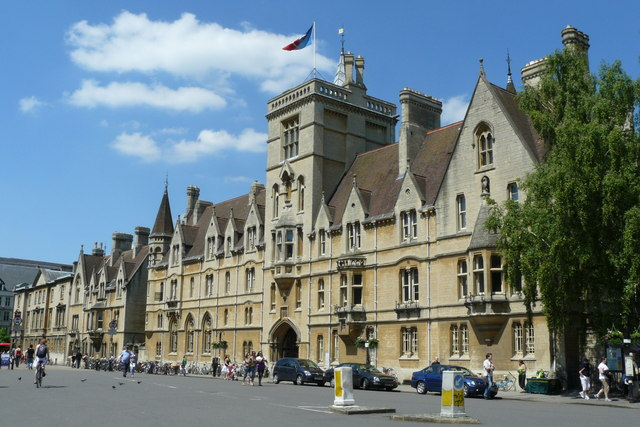
Balliol College, Oxford, where Masako studied international relations

After graduation Masako moved back to Japan, where for six months (April to October 1986) she studied law at the University of Tokyo to prepare for the Japanese Ministry of Foreign Affairs's entrance examination. Out of 800 applicants only 28 passed; Masako was one of them, along with two other women.

"She was assigned, first, to the oddly named Second International Organizations Division which deals with Japan's relations with international agencies, such as the OECD, a club of 30 rich countries committed to free trade and development. Her assignments included dealing with the OECD's environmental affairs committee ... by all accounts she acquitted herself well—her command of spoken languages, so rare in Japan, was a huge advantage—and was popular with most of her workmates." During her free time, Masako attended cooking classes to, according to interviews with her instructor, "be able to cook proper Japanese dishes when she was entertaining [foreigners]."

Two years later, in 1988, Masako was chosen by the Ministry to be sponsored for two years' postgraduate study overseas with full pay, just as her father Hisashi had been years earlier. Masako "desperately wanted to go back to Harvard to do her master's". According to her former Harvard adviser Oliver Oldman, she "tried to re-enroll to work towards ... a Juris Doctor. However, Harvard's bureaucrats would not give her credit for her study-time at the University of Tokyo." Therefore, Masako enrolled in her second choice, studying international relations under Sir Adam Roberts at Balliol College, Oxford. However, for unclear reasons Masako did not finish her thesis and instead returned to Japan in 1990.

== Courtship and marriage ==
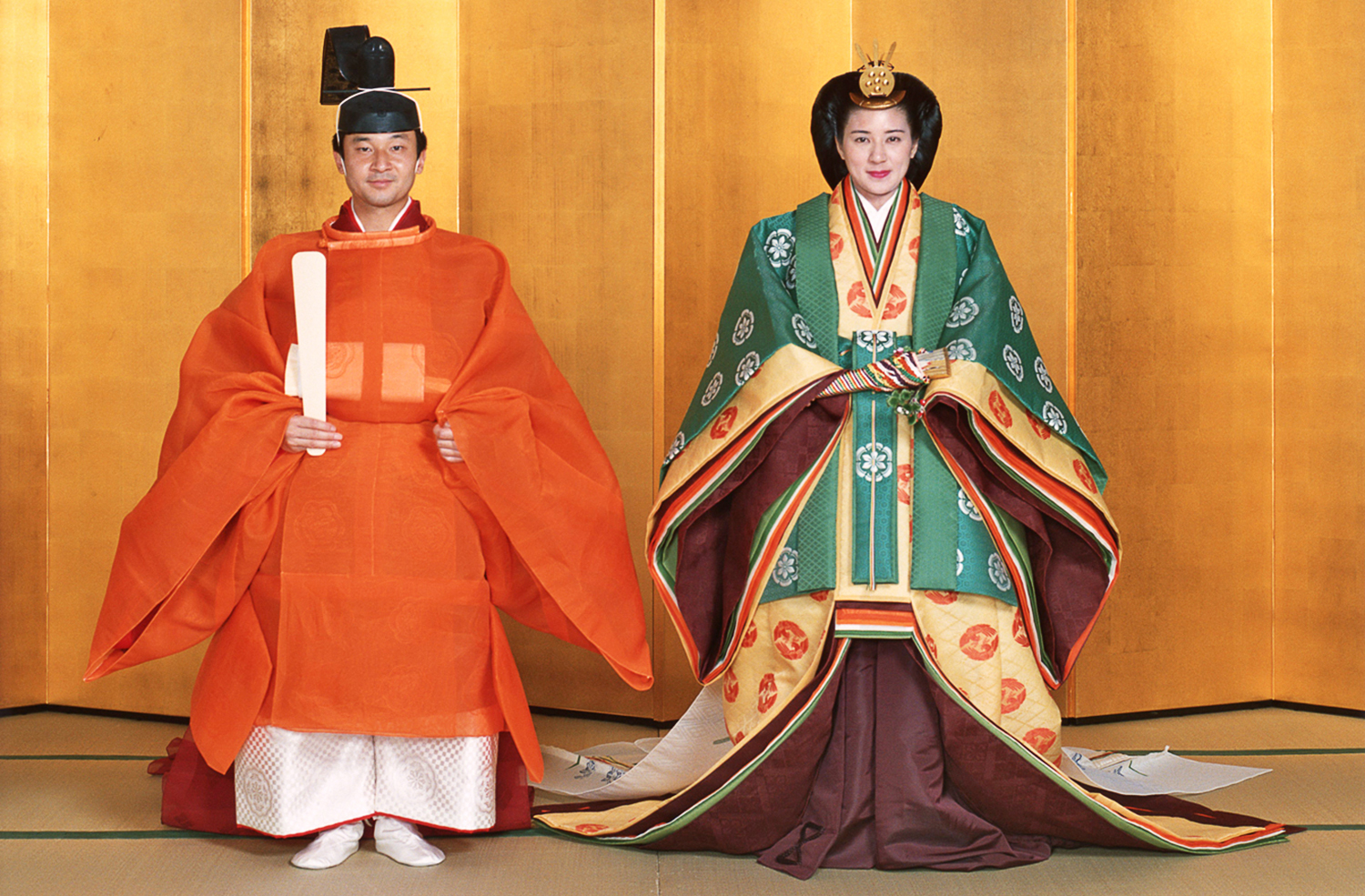
The newly married Crown Prince Naruhito and Crown Princess Masako in Japanese traditional attire, with the Prince wearing a sokutai, the Princess a jūnihitoe, 1993

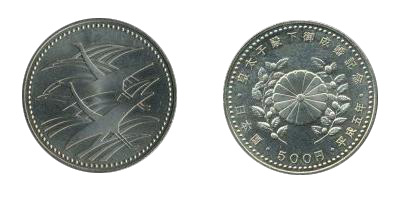
A 500-yen coin issued to commemorate the imperial wedding

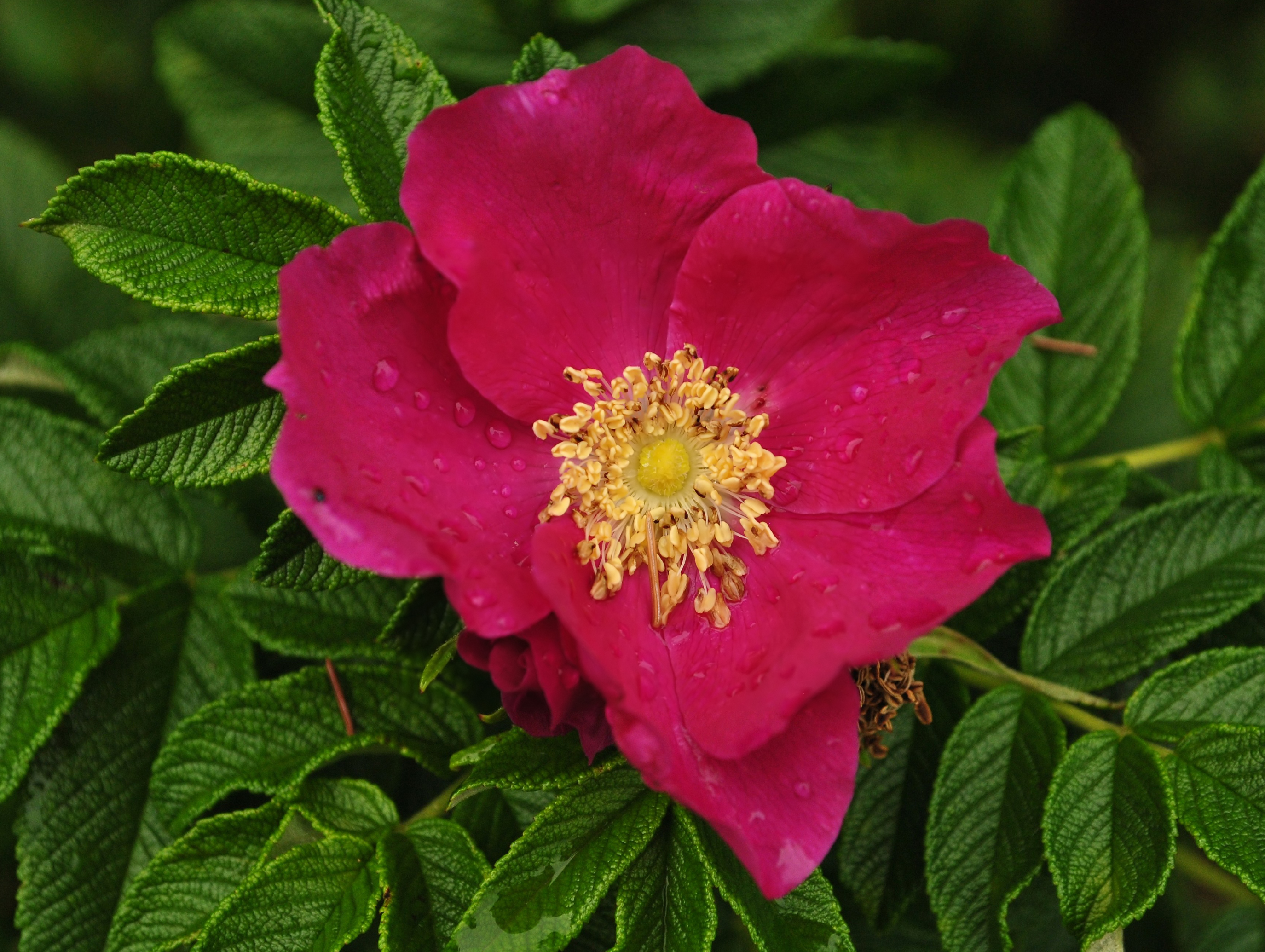
Crimson phenotype of Japanese 'Ramanas' rose, Rosa rugosa, Masako's designated imperial personal insignia

Masako first met Prince Naruhito at a tea for Infanta Elena of Spain, in November 1986, during her studies at the University of Tokyo. The prince was immediately captivated by her and arranged for them to meet several times over the next few weeks. Because of this they were pursued relentlessly by the press throughout 1987. However, Masako's name disappeared from the list of possible royal brides due to controversy about her maternal grandfather, Yutaka Egashira, who while working for the Industrial Bank of Japan was assigned to take over management of one of its debtors the Chisso Corporation to prevent it from financial collapse. Chisso, built in the 1930s, dumped the methylmercury used to make acetaldehyde (a chemical in plastic) into the water surrounding Minamata and other towns, causing the infamous Minamata disease and the resulting scandal.

Despite this controversy and Masako's travelling to Oxford University's Balliol College for the next two years, Naruhito remained interested in her. Masako refused to marry the prince because it would force her to give up her promising career in diplomacy and severely restrict her independence and freedoms. Masako finally accepted his third proposal on 9 December 1992. It was reported that he argued that serving as Crown Princess of Japan would only be "another form of diplomacy" before she finally accepted this third proposal. The Imperial Household Council formally announced the engagement on 19 January 1993; the engagement ceremony was held on 12 April 1993. Although many were surprised at the news, as it was believed that the prince and Masako had separated, the engagement was met with a surge of renewed media attention directed toward the Imperial family and their new princess.

Masako married Crown Prince Naruhito in a traditional wedding ceremony on 9 June 1993. By virtue of the marriage, Masako Owada assumed the formal style Her Imperial Highness The Crown Princess of Japan. As tradition dictates, upon her entry into the imperial family and like other members, she received the blossom of the endemic curly-leaved Japanese Ramanas rose (o-shirushi (お印)): Rosa rugosa (hamanasu, beach aubergine (ハマナス)) for an imperial personal emblem, which is mauve-lilac to crimson or white (rarely with cultivars to full or burst yellow), while her insignia as Crown Princess bear the forms of the imperial household's antique gold-traced white chrysanthemum. In addition, she was placed in the Japanese Imperial Order of Precedence (used for the most formal occasions) behind her mother-in-law, Empress Michiko, and her grandmother-in-law, Empress Dowager Nagako. The orchid flower Dendrobium cultivar Masako Kotaishi Hidenka was named in her honour to celebrate the wedding.

Masako became the third commoner to marry into the imperial family, after her mother-in-law, Empress Emerita Michiko (Michiko Shōda) and her sister-in-law, Crown Princess Kiko (Kiko Kawashima).

=== Children ===
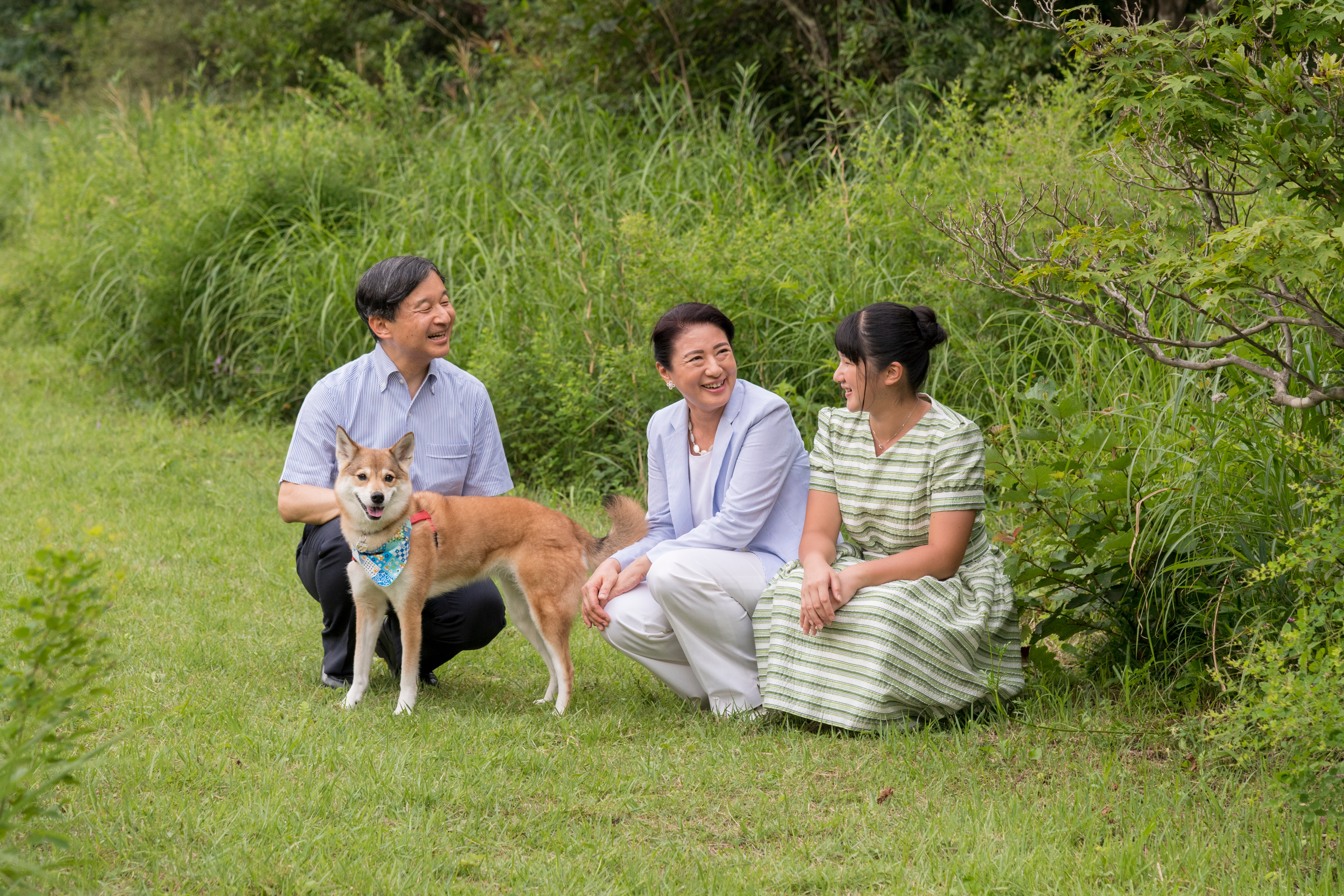
Naruhito and Masako with their daughter, Aiko, in Nasu Imperial Villa, Tochigi Prefecture in August 2019

Masako's first pregnancy was announced in December 1999, but she miscarried.

The Emperor and Empress have one daughter: Aiko, Princess Toshi (敬宮愛子内親王, Toshi-no-miya Aiko Naishinnō; born 1 December 2001 at Imperial Household Agency Hospital in Tokyo Imperial Palace).

=== Succession crisis ===
Their daughter's birth, which occurred more than eight years after their marriage, sparked lively debate in Japan about whether The Imperial Household Law of 1947 should be changed from that of agnatic primogeniture to either cognatic or absolute primogeniture, which would allow a woman to succeed to the Chrysanthemum Throne.

A government-appointed panel of experts submitted a report on 25 October 2005, recommending that the Imperial Succession Law be amended to permit absolute primogeniture. On 20 January 2006, Prime Minister Junichiro Koizumi used part of his annual keynote speech to address the controversy when he pledged to submit a bill to the National Diet letting women ascend to the throne in order that the imperial throne be continued in a stable manner. Koizumi did not announce a timing for the legislation to be introduced nor did he provide details about the content, but he did note that it would be in line with the conclusions of the 2005 Government Panel.

Plans to change the male-only law of Imperial succession were shelved after it was announced in February 2006 that Masako's brother-in-law and his wife, Prince and Princess Akishino, were expecting their third child. On 6 September 2006, Princess Akishino gave birth to a son, Hisahito, who was third-in-line to the Chrysanthemum Throne under the current law, after his uncle, the then-Crown Prince Naruhito, and his father, Prince Akishino.

== Crown Princess of Japan ==
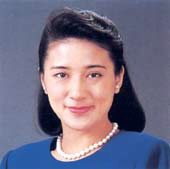
Masako, as Crown Princess

In 1994, the couple visited Saudi Arabia, Oman, Qatar and Bahrain. They visited Kuwait, the United Arab Emirates and Jordan in 1995, and again traveled to Jordan in 1999. In 1999, they also went to Belgium to attend the wedding of Prince Philippe, Duke of Brabant. In 2002, they paid a visit to New Zealand and Australia. In 2006, the Crown Prince and Crown Princess went to the Netherlands with their daughter, Princess Aiko, at the invitation of Queen Beatrix for a private visit.

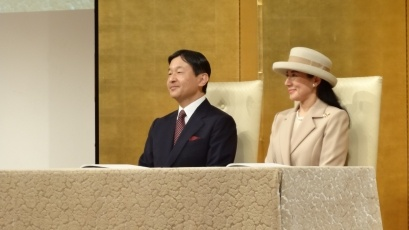
Crown Prince Naruhito and Crown Princess Masako attended the JET Programme 30th Anniversary Commemorative Ceremony at the Keio Plaza Hotel in Tokyo, November 2016.

On 30 April 2013, the Crown Prince and Crown Princess were present at the inauguration of King Willem-Alexander of the Netherlands, which was the Crown Princess's first official overseas appearance in eleven years. In October 2014, she was present at a banquet held in honour of King Willem-Alexander and Queen Máxima at the Tokyo Imperial Palace, which was her first appearance in such a ceremony in eleven years. She welcomed the couple during an official ceremony at the palace which was her first appearance in a welcoming ceremony after five years. In July 2015, Princess Masako traveled to Tonga with the Crown Prince in order to attend the coronation of King Tupou VI. Over 40 members of the Japanese media covered the event, during which the happy-looking Crown Princess was warmly welcomed.

== Empress of Japan ==
Upon the abdication of Masako's father-in-law, Emperor Akihito of Heisei era on 30 April 2019, his eldest son, Crown Prince Naruhito became the 126th Emperor of Japan, and his wife, Masako became empress consort on 1 May. The Emperor and Empress of Reiwa era were enthroned (Sokui Rei Seiden no Gi) at the Tokyo Imperial Palace on 22 October 2019.

Naruhito and Masako's first trip abroad as emperor and empress took place in September 2022, to the United Kingdom to attend the state funeral of Queen Elizabeth II. They visited Indonesia in June 2023, their first state visit.

In March 2024, Masako and Naruhito visited Wajima and Suzu, two cities affected by the Noto earthquake. The couple later visited an evacuation center in Anamizu on 12 April.

Masako and Naruhito embarked on a three-day state visit to the United Kingdom in late June 2024, at the invitation of King Charles III. The imperial couple had originally planned to visit in 2020 as guests of Queen Elizabeth II, but the state visit was cancelled due to the COVID-19 pandemic. The rescheduled visit went ahead despite concerns of postponement due to the British general election campaign that began in late May. It was the first state visit in modern times to take place during an active election campaign.

On 7 April 2025, the imperial couple visited Iwo Jima to commemorate the 80th anniversary of the Battle of Iwo Jima, in the first visit to the island by a Japanese monarch since 1994. In July 2025, the Imperial couple paid an eight-day state visit to Mongolia at the invitation of President Ukhnaagiin Khürelsükh.

== Health ==
Masako has periodically been out of the public eye, largely between 2004 and 2014, reportedly due to emotional disorders speculated to be caused by the pressure to produce a male heir and adjusting to life in the Imperial Family. In July 2004, she was diagnosed as suffering from adjustment disorder and was reported to be seeking treatment.

On 11 July 2008, Naruhito sought public understanding for his ailing wife. He was on an eight-day trip to Spain without her: "I would like the public to understand that Masako is continuing to make her utmost efforts with the help of those around her. Please continue to watch over her kindly and over the long term." Pressures to produce a male heir, to conform with the ancient traditions and a 1947 Imperial Household Law are perceived to be behind her illness, as well as negative media coverage of her behavior, the stress of royal responsibility and public life, and turf battles among the Imperial Household Agency.

In December 2012, at the time of her 49th birthday, Masako issued a statement thanking the Japanese people for their support and saying that she was still receiving treatment for her illness. The Japanese Constitution does not allow the members of the Imperial Family to engage in political activities. Naruhito made controversial comments about discourtesies and pressures placed on his wife by the Imperial Household Agency and his wife's desire to pursue the life of a diplomat.

In 2019, Masako accompanied her husband at official events and at his accession ceremonies. During the state visit of U.S. President Donald Trump and First Lady Melania Trump to Japan in April, Masako and Naruhito conversed with them without interpreters; the imperial couple are both fluent in English. Her doctors stated that she has not fully recovered but a strong sense of duty has helped her fulfill her responsibilities.

== Titles, styles and honours ==
=== Titles and styles ===
- 9 June 1993 – 30 April 2019: Her Imperial Highness The Crown Princess (皇太子妃殿下 Kōtaishi-hi Denka)
- 1 May 2019 – present: Her Majesty The Empress (皇后陛下 Kōgō Heika)

=== Honours ===
==== Foreign ====
- Austria: Grand Decoration of Honour in Gold with Sash for Services to the Republic of Austria (1999)
- Belgium: Grand Cordon of the Order of Leopold (2016)
- Brazil: Grand Cross of the Order of Rio Branco (13 March 2025)
- Hungary: Grand Cross of the Order of Merit of the Republic of Hungary (2000)
- Malaysia: Honorary Grand Commander of the Order of the Defender of the Realm (2012)
- Netherlands:
  - Grand Cross of the Order of the Crown (29 October 2014)
  - Knight Grand Cross of the Order of the Netherlands Lion (17 June 2026)
- Philippines: Order of Gabriela Silang (27 May 2026)
- Portugal: Grand Cross of the Order of Prince Henry (2 December 1992)
- Spain: Dame Grand Cross of the Royal Order of Isabella the Catholic (8 November 2008)
- Tonga:
  - Grand Cross of the Most Illustrious Order of Queen Sālote Tupou III (4 July 2015)
  - Coronation Medal of H.M. King George Tupou V (4 July 2015)

=== Honorary positions ===
- Honorary President of the Japanese Red Cross Society (formerly vice president as the Crown Princess)

=== Honorary degrees ===
- Doctor of Civil Law, University of Oxford (2024)

== Ancestry ==
Her father Hisashi is descended from the Owada clan, whose head Shinroku—Masako's 4th-great-grandfather—was called to Murakami in 1787 to serve the Naito clan that the Tokugawa shōgun had installed as the city's rulers 67 years earlier. After the fall of the shogunate, the Owadas participated in a salmon-fishing cooperative, the proceeds of which provided schooling for many local children, including Hisashi and his father Takeo.

Her mother Yumiko is descended from the Egashira clan which served the Saga clans near Nagasaki on the island of Kyushu. One of the Egashiras, Yasutaro, went on to command a battleship in the Russo-Japanese War. Yumiko's father was a wealthy banker who was at the time of her marriage the managing director of the Industrial Bank of Japan.

== See also ==
- Emperor of Japan: Succession
- Japanese imperial succession debate
- Princess Masako: Prisoner of the Chrysanthemum Throne

== Sources ==
- Hills, Ben (2006). Princess Masako: Prisoner of the Chrysanthemum Throne. London; New York: Jeremy P. Tarcher/Penguin. ISBN 1-58542-568-0. OCLC 76074219.

Japanese royalty
Preceded by Shōda Michiko	Empress consort of Japan; 2019–present	Incumbent
