= Takeshi Usami =

Takeshi Usami (Japanese: 宇佐美毅, romanized: Usami Takeshi) (December 19, 1903 – January 19, 1991) was a Japanese official who served as Grand Steward of the Imperial Household Agency (December 16, 1953 – May 26, 1978). He graduated from the University of Tokyo. He was a recipient of the Order of the Rising Sun.

Preceded by Tajima Michiji	Grand Steward of the Imperial Household Agency; 1953–1978	Succeeded by Tomohiko Tomita

== Bibliography ==
- Ikuhiko Hata 『旧制高校物語』文春新書
- Ikuhiko Hata 『戦前期日本官僚制の制度・組織・人事』 University of Tokyo出版
