= Shingo Haketa =

Japanese bureaucrat (born 1942)

Shingo Haketa (羽毛田 信吾, Haketa Shingo; born 5 April 1942) is a Japanese bureaucrat. He served as Grand Steward of the Imperial Household Agency from 1 April 2005 to 1 June 2012.

Appointed by Prime Minister Junichirō Koizumi, a promoter of absolute primogeniture, Haketa is known as a supporter of the report submitted by the Advisory Council on Imperial Household Act, recommending absolute primogeniture. He criticized Prince Tomohito of Mikasa for his comment that agnatic primogeniture should be kept, and requested the members of the Imperial House to refrain from expressing their opinions on the succession. Right after the birth of Prince Hisahito of Akishino, he commented that the newborn prince would not solve the succession crisis, and insisted that the law be changed. In November 2011, he held a meeting with Prime Minister Yoshihiko Noda to discuss the possibility for allowing women to head branches of the Imperial House (rather than losing imperial status upon marriage), in order to replenish the number of imperial members who can help fulfill the court-related duties.

He had worked at the Ministry of Health until he was installed as Vice-Grand Steward of the Imperial Household Agency in 2001. Among his senior colleagues at the Ministry of Health was Teijiro Furukawa, a member of the Advisory Council on the Imperial Household Law. Haketa announced his retirement effective 1 June 2012, and was replaced by Noriyuki Kazaoka.

== See also ==
- Japanese succession controversy

Political offices
| Preceded by Toshio Yuasa | Grand Steward; 2005–2012 | Succeeded by Noriyuki Kazaoka |
