= Michiji Tajima =

- 田島道治
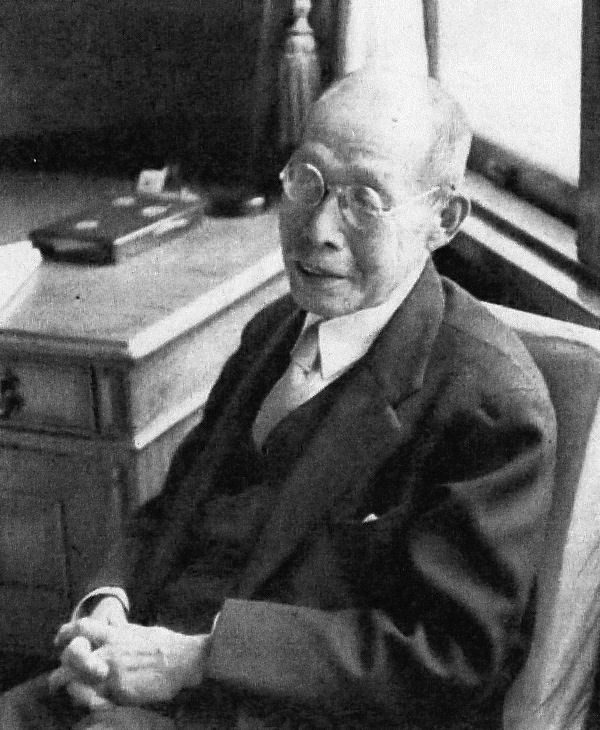
- Michiji Tajima
- Born: July 2, 1885; Japan
- Died: December 2, 1968; Japan
- Education: University of Tokyo
- Occupations: Businessman, educator, government official
- Known for: Grand Steward of the Imperial Household Office and Agency

Michiji Tajima (Japanese: 田島道治) (July 2, 1885 – December 2, 1968) was a Japanese businessman and educator. He was Grand Steward of the Imperial Household Office (June 5, 1948 – May 31, 1949) and continued as Grand Steward of its successor, the Imperial Household Agency (June 1, 1949 – December 16, 1953). He graduated from the University of Tokyo.

Documents written by Tajima and made public by the Japanese broadcaster NHK in 2019 suggest that Emperor Hirohito sought to apologize to the Japanese people for the damage caused during World War II. These include 18 notebooks, as well as a 1948 draft for an apology speech written in preparation for Japan gaining independence from Allied occupation in April 1952, which included phrases such as "deep shame" due to "my fault" (for the war). However, Japanese Prime Minister Shigeru Yoshida sought to avoid all mention of the war by Hirohito, and the passage referencing the emperor's "remorse" was dropped altogether.

== Bibliography ==
- 『孔子 その人とその伝説』, translation by Michiharu Tajima of “Confucius and his legend” by H. G. Creel, Iwanami Shoten, October 7, 1993 (6th printing), ISBN 4000028820. The author (Herrlee G. Creel, 1905–94) was a professor at the University of Chicago. First published on January 31, 1961, it has been republished several times. Later, on September 10, 2014, the same publisher published an on-demand version (ISBN 9784007301353).
- 『田島道治 昭和に「奉公」した生涯』(Tajima Michiji : Shōwa ni "hōkō" shita shōgai), TBSブリタニカ, 2002, ISBN 4484024047
- 『昭和天皇 「謝罪詔勅草稿」の発見』 (Shōwa Tennō "shazai shōchoku sōkō" no hakken), Kyōko Katō (加藤恭子著), 文藝春秋, 2003, ISBN 4163655301
- 『昭和天皇と田島道治と吉田茂』 (Shōwa Tennō to Tajima Michiji to Yoshida Shigeru: shodai Kunaichō Chōkan no "nikki" to "bunsho" kara), Kyōko Katō (加藤恭子著), 人文書館, 2006, ISBN 4903174042
