= Imperial Household Agency =

Japanese government agency

Coordinates: 35.684°N 139.754°E

- 宮内庁; Kunai-chō
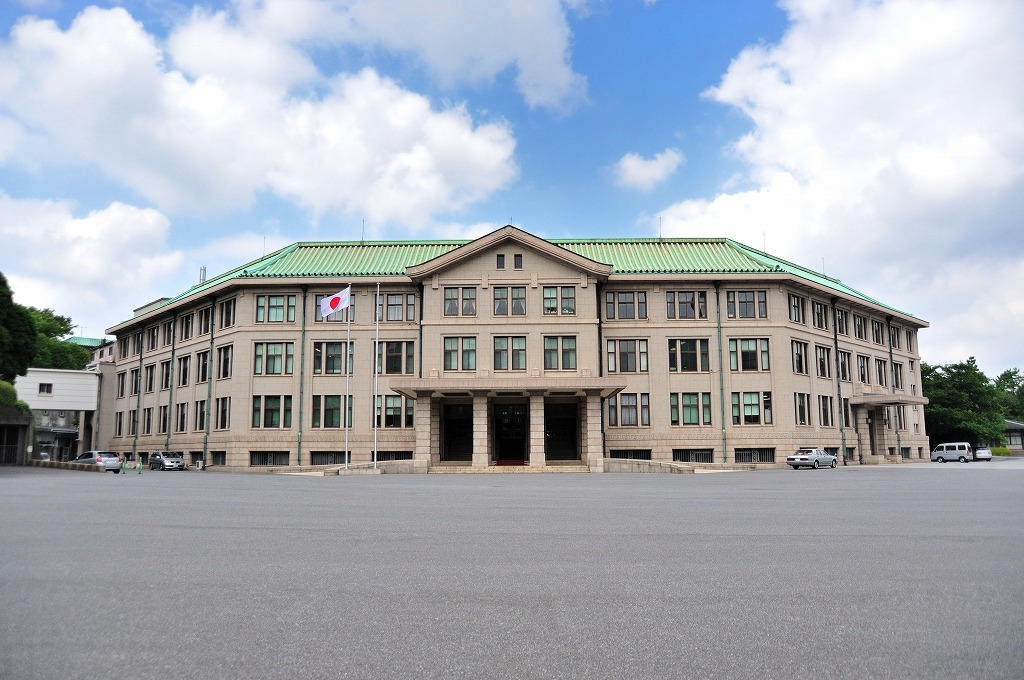
- Imperial Household Agency headquarters in the grounds of the Imperial Palace in Tokyo

Agency overview
- Formed: 1 June 1949
- Preceding agencies: Imperial Household Office (1947–1949); Ministry of the Imperial Household (701–1947)
- Jurisdiction: Japan
- Headquarters: 1-1 Chiyoda, Chiyoda-ku, Tokyo 100-8111, Japan
- Employees: 1,072
- Annual budget: ¥11,577,442,000 (FY 2023)
- Agency executives: Buichiro Kuroda, Grand Steward; Yoshimi Ogata, Vice-Grand Steward
- Parent agency: Cabinet Office
- Website: www.kunaicho.go.jp/eindex.html

The Imperial Household Agency (宮内庁, Kunai-chō) (IHA) is an agency of the government of Japan in charge of state matters concerning the Imperial Family, and the keeping of the Privy Seal and State Seal of Japan. From around the 8th century AD until the Second World War, it was known as the Imperial Household Ministry (宮内省, Kunai-shō).

The Agency is unique among conventional government agencies and ministries in that it does not directly report to the Prime Minister at the cabinet level.

== Organization and functions ==
The Imperial Household Agency is headed by the Grand Steward, assisted by the Vice Grand Steward, appointed by the Cabinet. Its main organizational positions are:

- the Grand Steward's Secretariat
- the Board of Chamberlains
- the Crown Prince's Household
- the Board of Ceremonies
- the Archives and Mausolea Department
- the Maintenance and Works Department
- the Kyoto Office

The current Grand Steward is Buichiro Kuroda, following the retirement of his predecessor, Yasuhiko Nishimura, on December 24, 2025.

The Agency's headquarters is located in the grounds of the Tokyo Imperial Palace. The Agency's duties and responsibilities encompass the daily activities of the Imperial household, such as state visits, organised events, preservation of traditional culture and administrative functions, amongst other responsibilities. The Agency is responsible for the various Imperial residences located throughout Japan, and organises guided tours for visitors to the Tokyo Imperial Palace, the Kyoto Imperial Palace, the Katsura Detached Palace, and other residences and locations falling under its remit.

The Agency is responsible for the health, security and travel arrangements of the Imperial family, including maintaining the Imperial line. The Board of the Chamberlains, headed by the Grand Chamberlain, manages the daily life of the Emperor and the Empress, and is responsible for keeping the Privy Seal and State Seal of Japan. The Grand Master of the Crown Prince's Household helps manage the schedules, dining menus, and household maintenance of the Crown Prince and his family.

== History ==
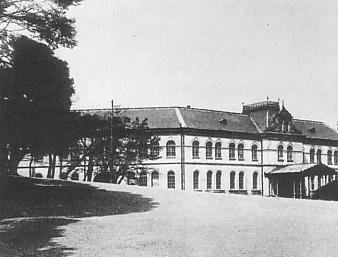
The Ministry of the Imperial Household in Meiji era

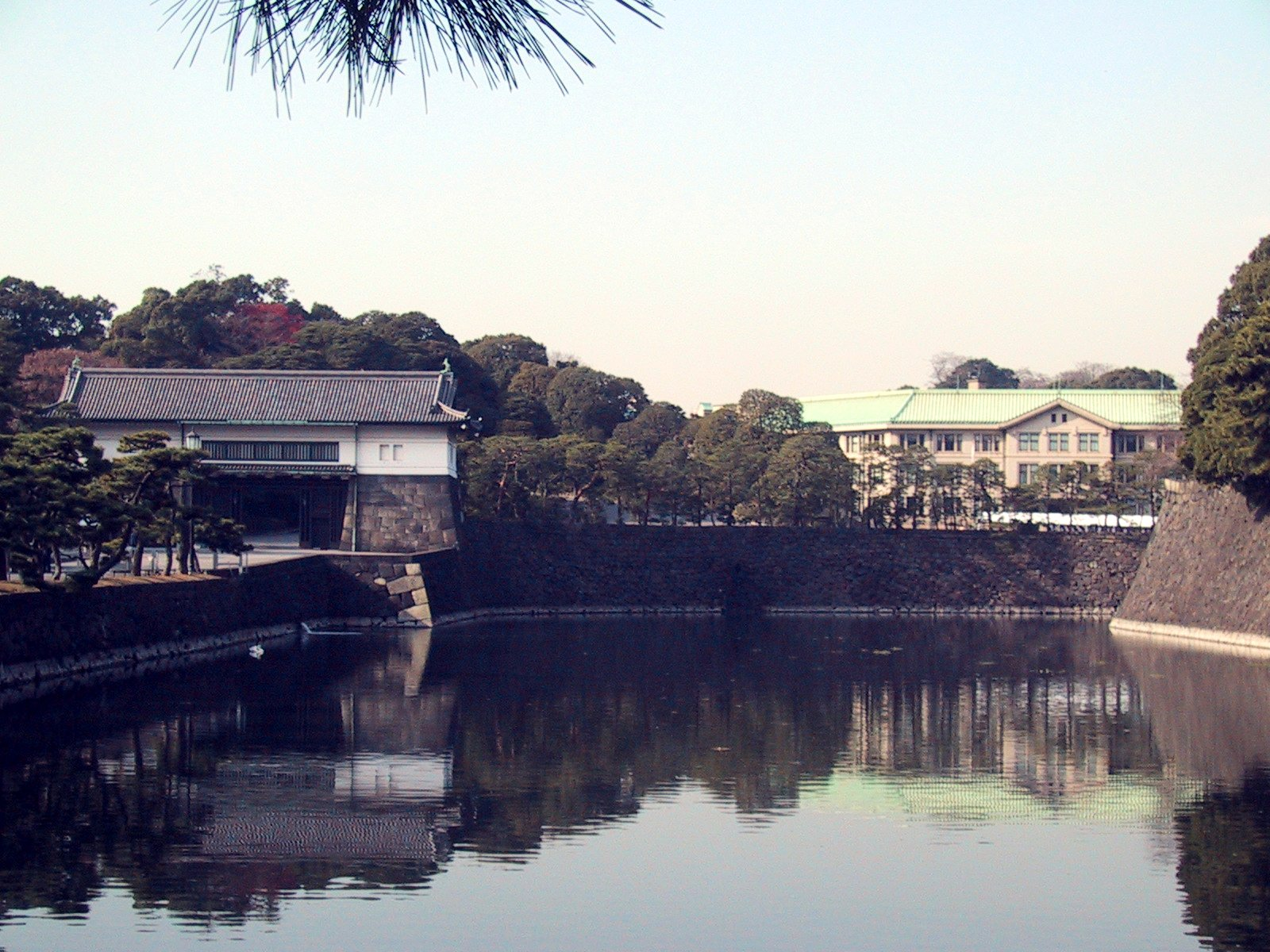
The Imperial Household Agency building, located near the Sakashita gate of the palace

The Imperial Household Agency traces its origins back to institutions established by the Taihō Code (or more formally, "The Ritsuryō Code of the Taihō period" (大宝律令, Taihō Ritsuryō)) promulgated in 701–702 AD. The Ritsuryō system established the namesake Ministry of the Imperial Household (宮内省, Kunai shō), a precursor to the present agency; the former code also gave rise to the Ministry of Ceremonial (式部省, Shikibu shō), which has its legacy in the Board of Ceremonies (式部職, Shikibu shoku) under the current agency, and the Ministry of Civil Administration (治部省, Jibu shō) which oversaw the Bureau of Music (雅楽寮, Uta ryō) that would now correspond to the Agency's Music Department (楽部, gakubu). The basic structures remained in place until the Meiji Restoration (1868).

=== Meiji period ===
The early Meiji government officially installed the Imperial Household Ministry (宮内省, Kunai shō) on 15 August 1869. Though the names are occasionally differentiated in English as the "Imperial Household Agency", versus the former, Meiji period "Ministry of the Imperial Household", both names are rendered with no differentiation in Japanese. However, there is a convoluted history of reorganization around how the government bodies that correspond to constituent subdivisions of the current Agency were formed or empowered during this period.

The Department of Shinto Affairs (神祇官, Jingi kan) and later the Ministry of Divinities (神祇省, Jingi shō) (1871–1872) were briefly established, having been placed in charge of, for example, the Imperial mausolea under the Office of Imperial Mausolea (諸陵寮), one of the tasks designated to the Agency today.

Meanwhile, the Meiji government created the Board of Ceremonies (式部局, Shikibu-kyoku) in 1871, which was soon renamed Bureau of Ceremonies (式部寮; Shikibu-ryō) in 1872. Also in 1872, the Ministry of Divinities was abolished, with the bulk of duties moved to the Ministry of Religion (教部省, "Department (Ministry) of Religion and Education") and the administration of formal ceremonial functions transferred to the aforementioned Board/Bureau of the Ceremonies. (Note: Kishimoto 1956 keeps calling it "Board of Ceremonies" instead of "Bureau" even after the name change.)

The Bureau of the Ceremonies was initially placed under the care of the Great Council of State (太政官, Dajō kan), but was later transferred to the control of the Imperial Household Ministry in September 1877. The Bureau underwent yet another name change to Board of Ceremonies (式部職, Shikibu-shoku) in October 1884. Since then, the name has remained unchanged and is, today, headed by the Master of Ceremonies.

An Imperial Order in 1908 confirmed that the Imperial Household Minister, as the chief official was then called, held responsible for assisting the Emperor in all matters concerning the Imperial House. The ministry also oversaw the official appointments of Imperial Household Artists and commissioned their work.

=== Imperial Household Office, 1947–1949 ===
The Imperial Household Office (宮内府, Kunai-fu), a downgraded version of the ministry, was created pursuant to Imperial Household Office Law (宮内府法) Law No. 70 of 1947 during the American Occupation of Japan. Its number of staff was downscaled from 6,200 to less than 1,500, and the Office was placed under the Prime Minister of Japan. (Note: In 1947, ahead of the new constitution the Imperial Household Act was promulgated, along with the Imperial Household Finance Law (Law No. 4 of 1947) and the Imperial Household Office Law (Law. No. 70 of 1947) 小森, 義峯 (Komori, Yoshimine) (1985). 天皇と憲法(Tennō to kenpō) (snippet). 皇學館大學出版部. p. 162. ASIN B000J6P1OK. ちなみに、皇室に関して新しく制定された法律としては、この「皇室典範」の外に、皇室経済法(昭和二二年法律四号)、宮内府法(昭和二二年法律七〇 号)などが存する。 Reprint 2002 ISBN 978-4-876-44081-8)

=== Imperial Household Agency, 1949–present ===
In 1949, Imperial Household Office was renamed to the Imperial Household Agency, and placed under the fold of the newly created Prime Minister's Office (総理府, Sōrifu), as an external agency attached to it. In 2001, the Imperial Household Agency was organizationally re-positioned under the Cabinet Office (内閣府, Naikakufu).

== Criticism ==
The Agency has been criticized for isolating members of the Imperial Family from the Japanese public, and for insisting on stiffly preserved customs, rather than permitting a more approachable, populist monarchy.

In May 2004, Crown Prince Naruhito criticised the then-Grand Steward of the Imperial Household, Toshio Yuasa, for putting pressure on Crown Princess Masako, Naruhito's wife, to bear a male child. At a press conference, Naruhito stated that his wife had "completely exhausted herself" trying to adapt to the Imperial family's life, and added "there were developments that denied Masako's career (up to our marriage) as well as her personality." It has officially been stated that Masako is suffering from an "adjustment disorder", but there has been extensive speculation in the press that she is suffering from clinical depression as a result of her treatment by Imperial Household officials.

Increasingly in recent years, the Agency's prevention of archaeological research regarding a large number (more than 740) of Kofun Period tombs claimed to be and designated as "Imperial" has come under criticism from academics. The tombs, located in the Kansai region of western Japan, are considered by many academics as potentially holding important historical information on the origins of Japanese civilization; however, the possibility that these potential finds could verify or further solidify theories of formative civilizational ties with contemporary civilizations in China and the Korean Peninsula, with these civilizations potentially having as much influence on the origins of the Imperial Household itself, is generally considered to be a considerable contributing factor to the ongoing prevention of archaeological research at these sites by the Imperial Household Agency, with a large number of the tombs considered by some to be imperial only in name.

== Grand Stewards ==
The Imperial Household Agency is headed by the Grand Steward (Imperial Household Agency Law, Article 8-1), whose appointment or dismissal is subject to the Emperor's approval (Article 8-2).

The Grand Steward is vested with comprehensive control over administrative activities within the Agency, and supervisory authority over the service performance of the staff (8–3). He is empowered to interact with the Prime Minister on matters pertaining to the Agency's authorized duties, either requesting the issuance of Cabinet Office ordinances (8–3), or notifying him on pertinent matters (8–4). He has the authorization to hand down orders or directives to staff members of government organs under the agency's direct control (8–6), and may request the Commissioner General of the National Police Agency to take appropriate measures regarding administrative duties that involve the civilian Imperial Guard (皇宮警察, Kōgū Keisatsu).

The Grand Stewardship is a post customarily filled by former administrative vice-ministers (≒permanent secretaries) at one of several internal affairs (home affairs) type ministries and agencies, or someone with a closely approximating curriculum vitae (e.g., Superintendent General of the Tokyo Metropolitan Police Department), after having served as Vice-Grand Steward.

List of Grand Stewards
No.	Portrait	Name	Term of office	Ex-service	Remarks
Grand Stewards of the Imperial Household Office
1		Matsudaira Yoshitami	3 May 1947 – 5 Jun 1948	Imperial Household Ministry	
2		Michiji Tajima	5 Jun 1948 – 31 May 1949	Civilian	
Grand Stewards of the Imperial Household Agency
1		Michiji Tajima	1 Jun 1949 – 16 Dec 1953	Civilian	cont.
2		Takeshi Usami	16 Dec 1953 – 26 May 1978	Home Ministry	
3		Tomohiko Tomita	26 May 1978 – 14 Jun 1988	National Police Agency	
4		Shōichi Fujimori	14 Jun 1988 – 19 Jan 1996	Ministry of Welfare, Environment Agency	
5		Sadame Kamakura	19 Jan 1996 – 2 Apr 2001	National Police Agency	
6		Toshio Yuasa	2 Apr 2001 – 1 Apr 2005	Ministry of Home Affairs	
7		Shingo Haketa	1 Apr 2005 – 1 Jun 2012	Ministry of Health	
8		Noriyuki Kazaoka	1 Jun 2012 – 26 Sep 2016	Ministry of Construction	
9		Shin'ichirō Yamamoto	26 Sep 2016 – 17 Dec 2019	Ministry of Home Affairs	
10		Yasuhiko Nishimura	17 Dec 2019 – 24 Dec 2025	National Police Agency	
11		Buichiro Kuroda	24 Dec 2025 – present	Ministry of Home Affairs; Ministry of Internal Affairs and Communications	

== See also ==
- Imperial Household Law
- Lord Keeper of the Privy Seal of Japan
- Imperial Household Department, China
- Matsushiro Underground Imperial Headquarters
- Office of the Yi Dynasty, also known as Ri Oshoku (李王職), which was part of the Imperial Household Ministry during 1911–1945.
- Honglujing Stele
