= Sadame Kamakura =

Sadame Kamakura (Japanese: 鎌倉節) (April 27, 1930 – October 25, 2014) was a Japanese official who served as Grand Steward of the Imperial Household Agency (January 19, 1996 – April 2, 2001). He graduated from the University of Tokyo. He was a recipient of the Order of the Sacred Treasure.

Political offices
| Preceded by Shōichi Fujimori | Grand Steward of the Imperial Household Agency; 1996–2001 | Succeeded by Toshio Yuasa |
