= Empress Michiko =

Empress of Japan from 1989 to 2019

Michiko
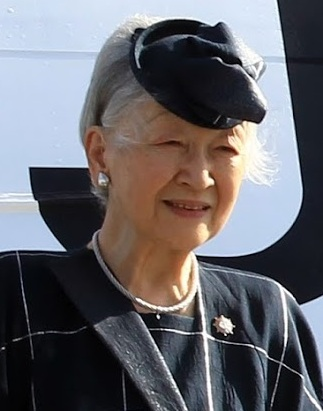
- Michiko in 2016

Empress consort of Japan
- Tenure: 7 January 1989 – 30 April 2019
- Enthronement: 12 November 1990
- Born: Michiko Shōda (正田 美智子); 20 October 1934 (age 92); Bunkyō, Tokyo, Japan
- Spouse: Akihito (m. 1959)
- Issue: Naruhito, Emperor of Japan; Fumihito, Crown Prince of Japan; Sayako Kuroda
- House: Imperial House of Japan (by marriage)
- Father: Hidesaburō Shōda
- Mother: Fumiko Soejima
- Religion: Shinto

Michiko (美智子; born Michiko Shōda [正田 美智子 Shōda Michiko], 20 October 1934) is a member of the Imperial House of Japan who has been the Empress Emerita of Japan since 1 May 2019. She was the Empress of Japan as the wife of Akihito, the 125th Emperor of Japan reigning from 7 January 1989 to 30 April 2019.

Michiko married Crown Prince Akihito and became Crown Princess of Japan in 1959. She was the first commoner to marry into the Japanese imperial family. She has three children with her husband: Naruhito, Fumihito, and Sayako. Her elder son, Naruhito, is the current emperor. As crown princess and later as empress consort, she has become the most visible and widely travelled imperial consort in Japanese history. Upon Akihito's abdication, Michiko received the new title of Jōkōgō (上皇后), or Empress Emerita.

== Early life and education ==
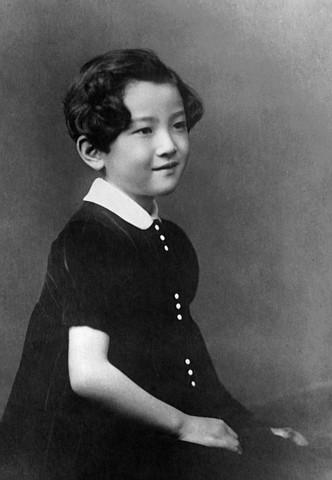
Michiko in 1940

Michiko Shōda was born on 20 October 1934 at the University of Tokyo Hospital in Bunkyō, Tokyo, the second of four children born to Hidesaburō Shōda (正田英三郎, Shōda Hidesaburō; 1903–1999), president and later honorary chairman of Nisshin Flour Milling Company, and his wife, Fumiko Soejima (副島 富美子, Soejima Fumiko; 1909–1988). Raised in Tokyo and in a cultured family, she grew up receiving a careful education, both traditional and European, learning to speak English and to play piano and being initiated into the arts such as painting, cooking and kōdō. She has an older brother Iwao, a younger brother Osamu, and a younger sister Emiko. She is the niece of several academics, including Kenjirō Shōda, a mathematician who was the president of the University of Osaka from 1954 until 1960.

Shōda attended Futaba Elementary School in Kōjimachi, a neighbourhood in Chiyoda, Tokyo, but was required to leave in her fourth-grade year because of the American bombings during World War II. She was then successively educated in the prefectures of Kanagawa (in the town of Katase, now part of the city of Fujisawa), Gunma (in Tatebayashi, the home town of the Shōda family), and Nagano (in the town of Karuizawa, where Shōda had a second resort home). She returned to Tokyo in 1946 and completed her elementary education in Futaba and then attended the Sacred Heart School for Junior High School and High School in Minato, Tokyo. She graduated from high school in 1953.

In 1957, Shōda graduated summa cum laude from the Faculty of Literature at the University of the Sacred Heart (a Catholic university in Tokyo) with a Bachelor of Arts degree in English literature.

Since she came from a particularly wealthy family, her parents were very selective about her suitors. There had been several contenders for her hand in marriage in the 1950s. Biographers of the far-right writer Yukio Mishima, including Henry Scott Stokes and David Vernon, report that Mishima had considered marrying Michiko Shōda, and that he was introduced to her for that purpose sometime in the 1950s.

== Engagement and marriage ==
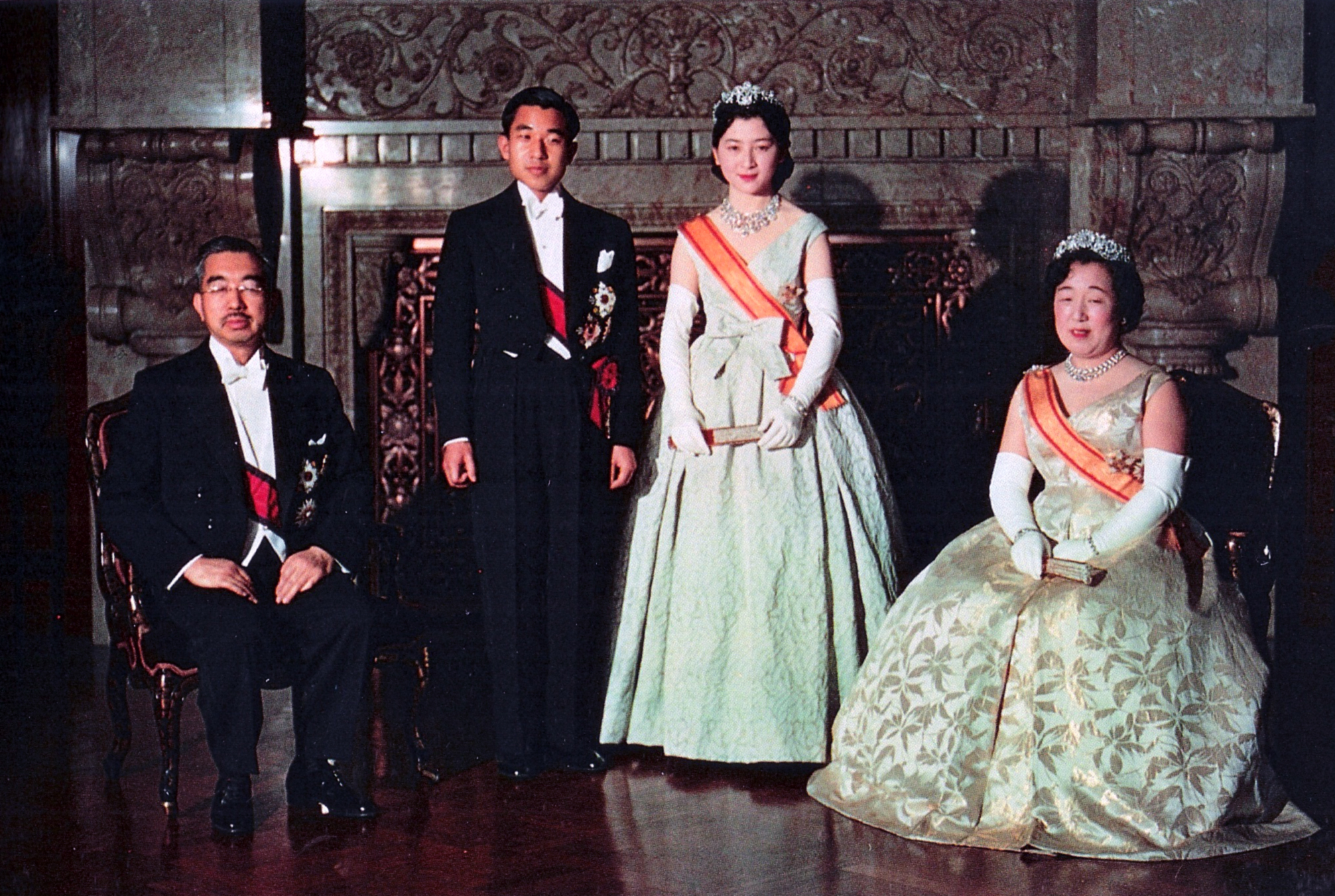
Wedding portrait with Emperor Shōwa and Empress Kōjun, 10 April 1959

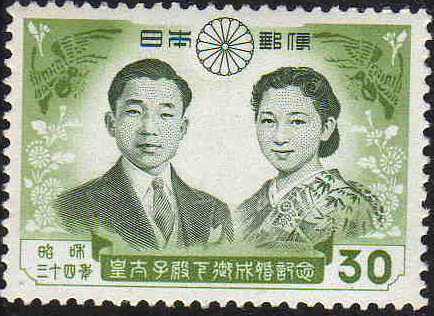
A Japanese stamp commemorating the imperial wedding

In August 1957, she met then-Crown Prince Akihito on a tennis court at Karuizawa near Nagano. The Imperial Household Council formally approved the engagement of the Crown Prince to Michiko Shōda on 27 November 1958. At that time, the media presented their encounter as a real "fairy tale", or the "romance of the tennis court". The engagement ceremony took place on 14 January 1959.

The future Crown Princess was the daughter of a wealthy industrialist, but she was still a commoner. During the 1950s, the media and most persons familiar with the Japanese monarchy had assumed that the powerful Imperial Household Agency would select a bride for the Crown Prince from the daughters of the former court nobility, or from one of the former branches of the Imperial Family. Some traditionalists opposed the engagement, as Shōda came from a Catholic family. was educated at Catholic institutions and seemed to share the faith of her parents. It was also widely rumoured that Empress Kōjun had opposed the engagement. After the death of Empress Kōjun in 2000, Reuters recalled her as one of the strongest opponents of the marriage. Death threats alerted the authorities to ensure the security of the Shōda family. Mishima, known for his extreme traditionalist position, said at the time: "The imperial system becomes 'tabloidesque' in its move toward democratization. It's all wrong—the idea (of the Imperial Family) losing its dignity by connecting with the people."

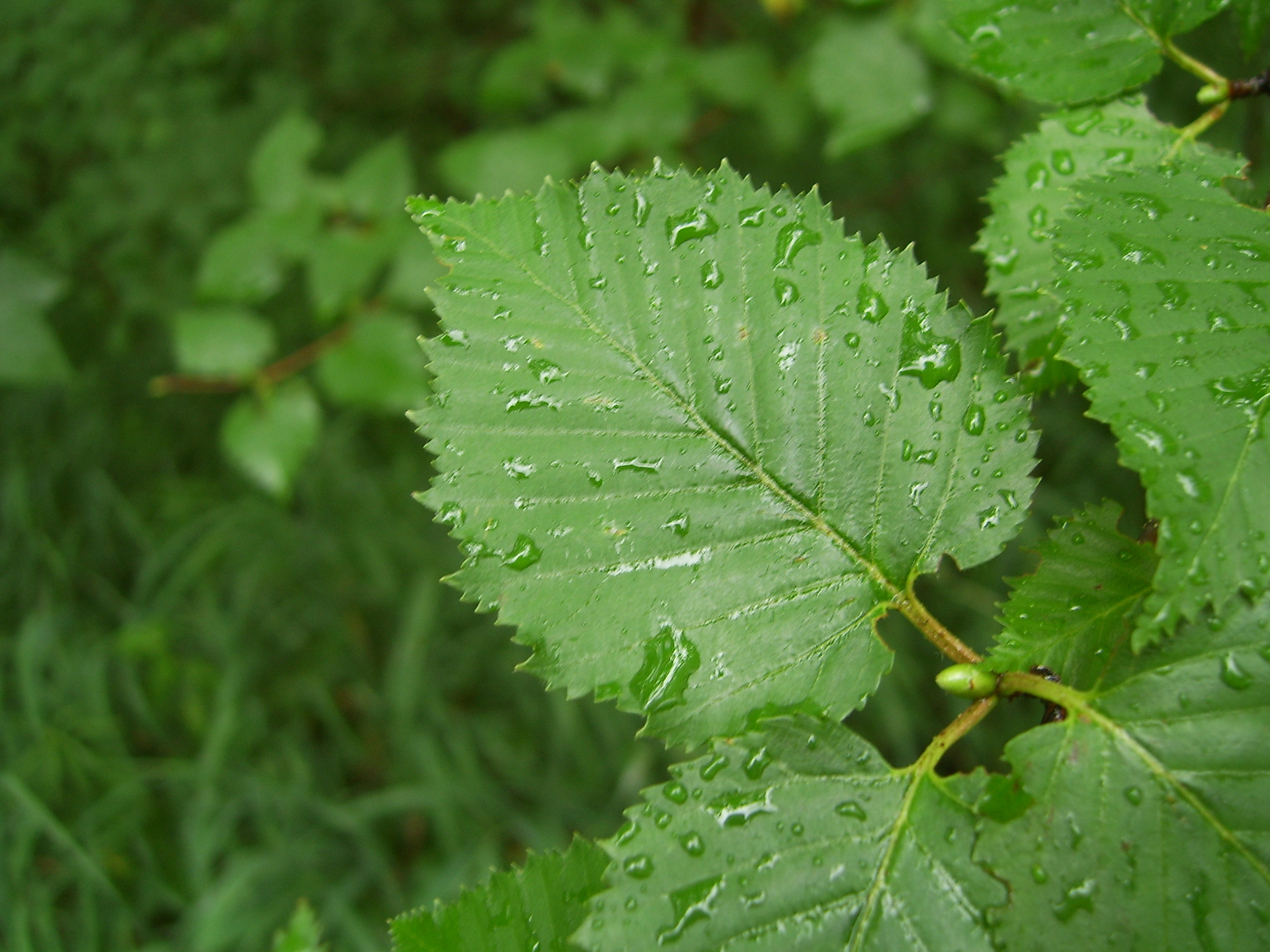
Japanese white birch, Betula platyphylla, designated imperial personal emblem of Michiko

However, the young couple had by then gained wide public support. That support also came from the ruling political class. Additionally, everyone showed affection for the young "Mitchy" who had become the symbol of Japan's modernization and democratization (the media at the time hinted at the phenomenon of a "Mitchy boom"). The wedding finally took place as a traditional Shinto ceremony on 10 April 1959. The wedding procession was followed in the streets of Tokyo by more than 500,000 people spread over an 8.8 km route, while parts of the wedding were televised, thus making it the first imperial wedding to be made available for public viewership in Japan, drawing about 15 million viewers. In accordance with tradition, Shōda received a personal emblem (o-shirushi (お印)): the white birch of Japan (Shirakaba (白樺)) upon admission to the imperial family.

== Crown Princess ==
The young couple then moved to Tōgū Palace (東宮御所, Tōgū-gosho), or "East Palace", the traditional name of the official residence of the crown prince installed since 1952, located within the grounds of the Akasaka Estate in Motoakasaka, Minato, Tokyo. They left Tōgū Palace after her husband acceded to the throne in 1989.

The couple have three children (two sons and a daughter):

1. Naruhito, Prince Hiro (浩宮徳仁親王, Hiro-no-miya Naruhito Shinnō; born 23 February 1960 at Imperial Household Agency Hospital in Tokyo Imperial Palace, Tokyo)
2. Fumihito, Prince Aya (礼宮文仁親王, Aya-no-miya Fumihito Shinnō; born 30 November 1965 at Imperial Household Agency Hospital in Tokyo Imperial Palace, Tokyo)
3. Sayako, Princess Nori (紀宮清子内親王, Nori-no-miya Sayako Naishinnō; born 18 April 1969 at Imperial Household Agency Hospital in Tokyo Imperial Palace, Tokyo), following her marriage to urban designer Yoshiki Kuroda on 15 November 2005, Princess Nori gave up her imperial title and left the Imperial Family as required by 1947 Imperial Household Law, took the surname of her husband and became known as "Sayako Kuroda" (黒田清子, Kuroda Sayako).

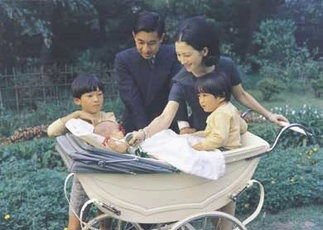
Michiko and her family in 1969

In 1963, the Associated Press reported that the Crown Princess, then about three months pregnant, underwent an abortion on 22 March, in Tokyo. As the article stated, "The operation was advised by her physician, Prof. Takashi Kobayashi, who delivered Michiko's first child, three-year-old Prince Hiro, a spokesman said. The spokesman said it is believed the 28-year-old princess' health has been impaired by a continuous round of official and social functions before pregnancy".

In the summer of 1961, Emperor Shōwa was reportedly displeased with Michiko's Catholicism, a faith she had embraced after receiving a Catholic education at the University of the Sacred Heart. According to Bungeishunju, the Crown Princess knelt on the carpet and offered an apology, but the Emperor was still displeased.

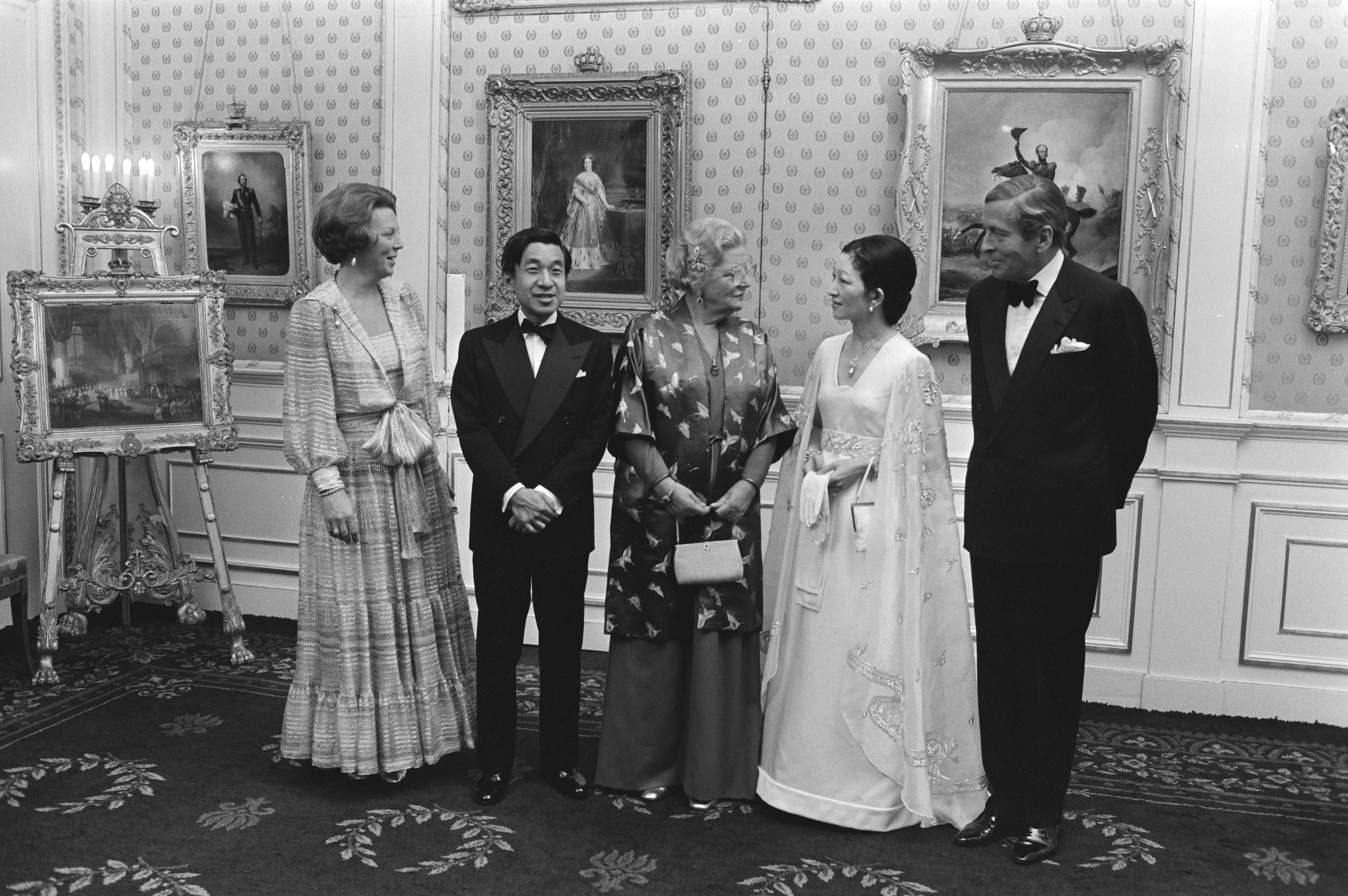
Crown Prince Akihito and Crown Princess Michiko with Queen Juliana, Princess Beatrix and Prince Claus in 1979

Contrary to the tradition that the children of the imperial family should be separated from their parents and placed with private tutors, Crown Prince Akihito and his wife Crown Princess Michiko again broke precedent from the start by preferring to raise their children instead of entrusting them to the care of court chamberlains; the Crown Princess even breastfed. She and her husband have also built up a strong position among the general public, by their frequent trips in the 47 prefectures in the country to meet people but also for the liberties taken by the imperial couple vis-a-vis the protocol. At a more formal level, the Crown Prince and Princess visited 37 foreign countries between 1959 and 1989.

== Empress of Japan ==
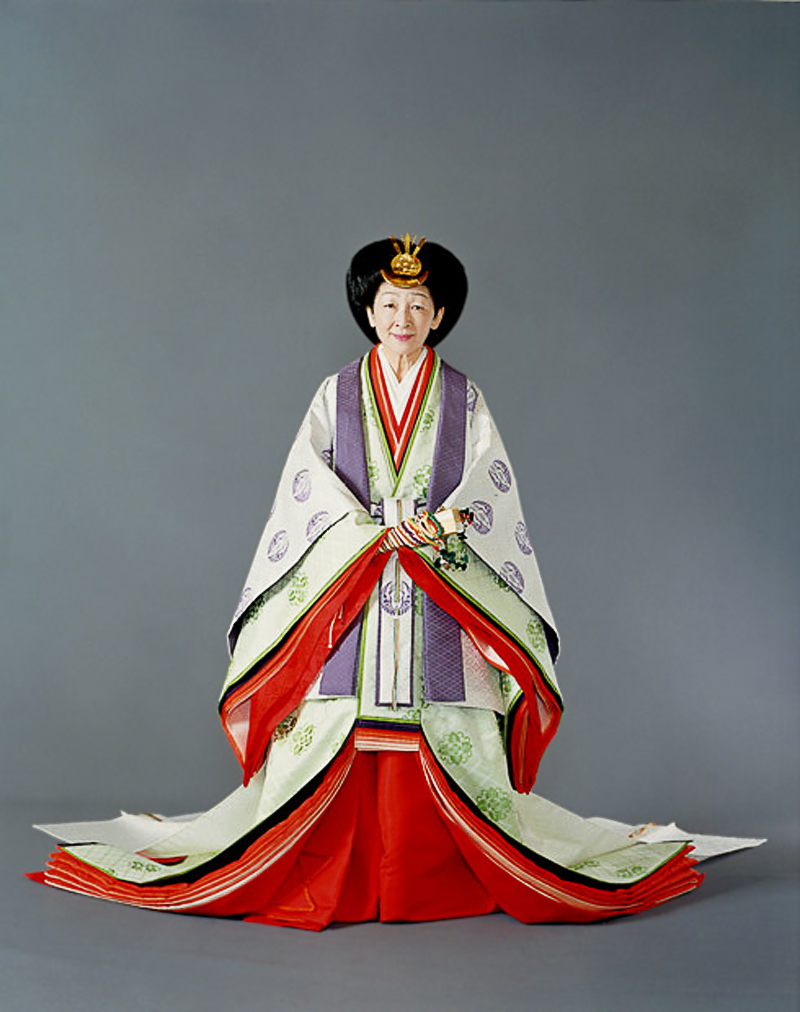
Empress Michiko wearing the jūnihitoe at the enthronement ceremony in November 1990

Upon the death of Emperor Shōwa on 7 January 1989, Crown Princess Michiko's husband became the 125th Emperor of Japan, and she became empress consort. The new Emperor and Empress were enthroned (Sokui Rei Seiden no Gi) at the Tokyo Imperial Palace on 12 November 1990.

Since their enthronement and until her husband's abdication, the imperial couple visited many countries, and did much to make the Imperial Family more visible and approachable in contemporary Japan. They also tried to be close to the people, visiting the 47 prefectures of Japan.

Her official duties, apart from visits to other countries, were to assist her husband at events and ceremonies, both within and outside the Imperial Palace, receiving official guests including state guests and also to visit the social, cultural and charitable institutions and facilities. For example, in 2007, Michiko performed duties in her official capacity on more than 300 occasions. For many years Akihito and Michiko visited facilities for children on Children's Day and facilities for the elderly on Respect for the Aged Day. Beginning in 2014 they passed on these duties to the younger generation though it was announced by the Imperial Household Agency that their health had no bearing on this decision. Following the death of her mother-in-law, Empress Dowager Nagako, on 16 June 2000, she succeeded her as honorary president of the Japanese Red Cross Society.

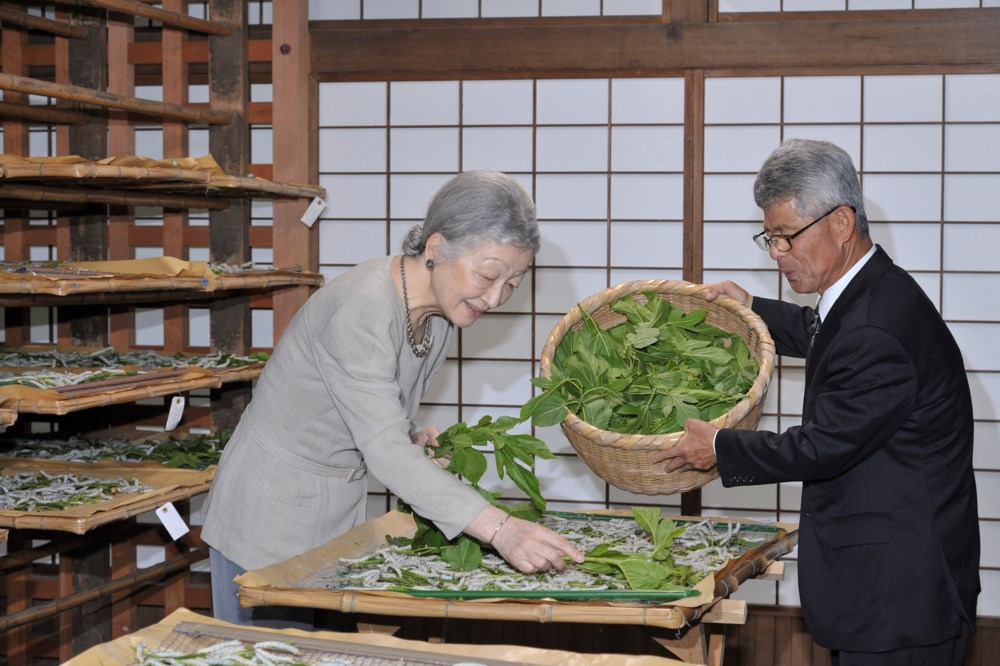
The Empress feeds mulberry leaves to silkworms in the Imperial Palace Grounds, May 2013.

As empress, she was particularly responsible for Momijiyama Imperial Cocoonery, a sericulture farm on the grounds of the imperial palace. She participated in the annual ceremony of harvesting silk, personally fed silkworms with mulberry leaves and was responsible for taking care of them, the frames, and the harvesting. The production and harvesting of silk were part of her ceremonial duties, linked to Shintoism, Japanese culture, and tradition. From 1994 to 2019, the Empress offered a part of the harvested silk of the koishimaru variety (the oldest species now kept in Japan) to the Shōsōin Treasure-house in the Buddhist temple Tōdai-ji in Nara to be used for the restoration of its treasures.

The Empress of Japan is expected to be the embodiment of traditional values such as modesty and purity. Michiko demonstrated a strong sense of duty throughout her life, which made her quite popular amongst the Japanese. She took part in religious ceremonies with her husband, such as visits to Ise Grand Shrine, other Shinto shrines and Imperial mausoleums to pray to the Imperial Family's ancestral spirits. In addition, she is an accomplished classical pianist.

The Empress was elevated into the Hall of Fame of International Best Dressed List in 1990.

On the abdication of her husband on 30 April 2019, she became the Empress Emerita. Since the abdication, the couple's primary residence has been the Takanawa Residence. In August 2023, Michiko and Akihito visited the tennis court where they first met and interacted with members of the organization responsible for its upkeep.

== Hobbies, passions and literary works ==
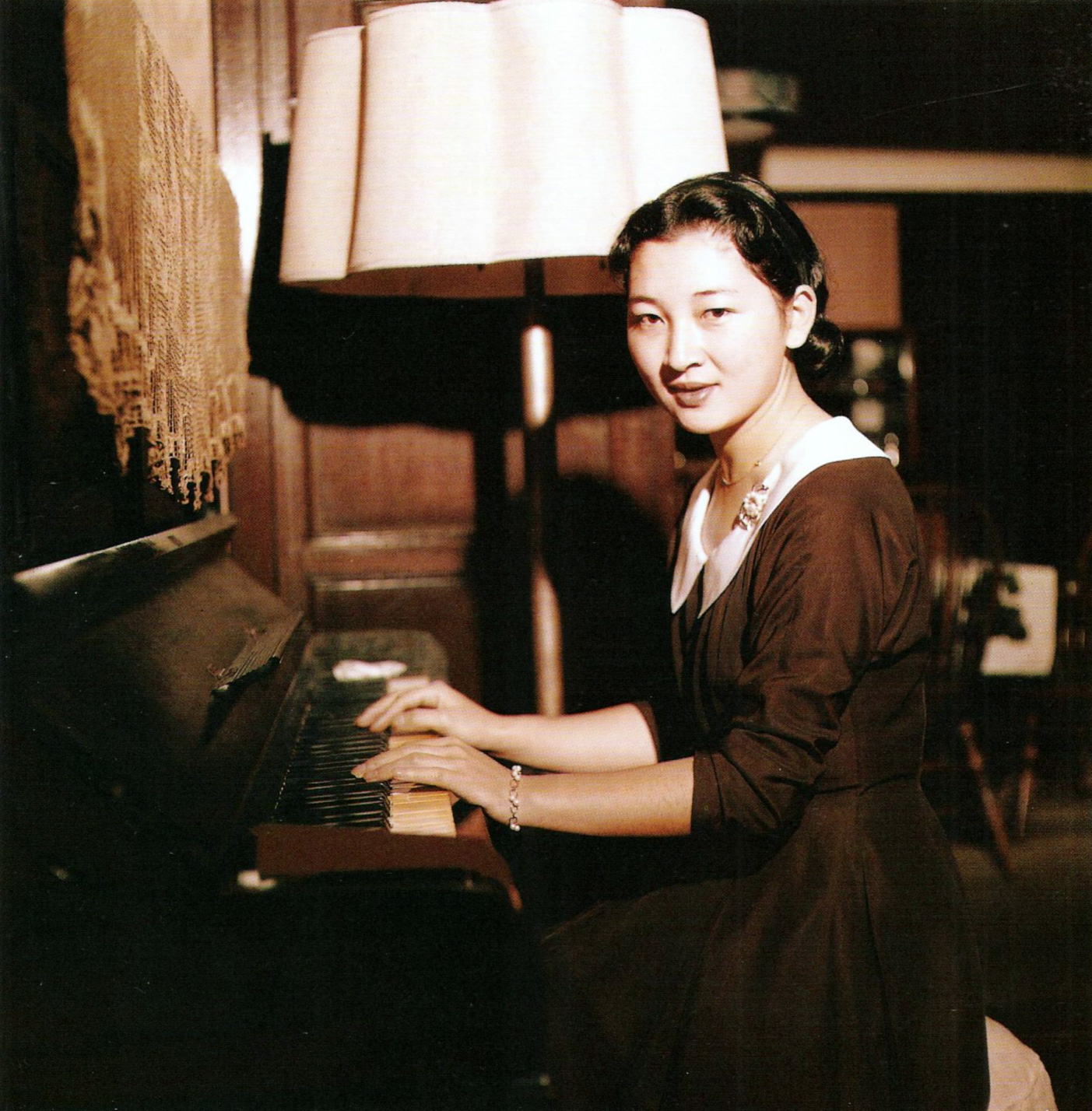
Michiko Shōda while playing piano in October 1958

The Empress Emerita particularly enjoys reading, music and plays the piano and harp. Moreover, the imperial family has been known for several decades to form, occasionally, a family piano trio, with Crown Prince Akihito playing the cello, Crown Princess Michiko playing the piano, and Prince Naruhito playing the violin. Empress Michiko is also known to be particularly keen on gagaku, a kind of traditional Japanese court music.

She is also a fan of poetry, including the works of Michio Mado that she has selected, compiled and translated several of his poems in a series of collections under the titles Dobutsu-tachi (Animals) in 1992 and Fushigi na Poketto (The Magic Pocket) in 1998.

She has composed several poems, including waka. Some of them have been published: a series of compound waka by Akihito and Michiko, Crown Prince and Princess, were published in 1987 and then republished in 1991 under the title Tomoshibi: Light. Finally, a collection of 367 waka by the Empress was published in 1997 under the title Seoto (瀬音, The Sound Current), and 53 of them have been translated into French and published in France by Signatura under the title Sé-oto, song of the ford.

In 1991, she wrote a children's book, illustrated by Wako Takeda: Hajimete no Yamanobori ("My First Mountain Climb").

She is a hibernophile with an interest in Children of Lir, recites I See His Blood Upon The Rose by Joseph Plunkett as a party piece, and even speaks passable Irish.

== Health ==
Michiko suffered from several nervous breakdowns because of the pressure of the media and, according to Reuters, the attitude of her mother-in-law, Empress Nagako, that had resulted in particular in making her lose her voice for seven months in the 1960s. She briefly collapsed at the Akasaka Palace on her birthday in 1993 and did not speak for two months, a condition caused by "deep sadness" and attributed by her doctors to negative media coverage.

Empress Michiko had to cancel many of her official duties in the spring of 2007, while suffering from mouth ulcers, nosebleeds and intestinal bleeding due to psychological stress, according to her doctors. This would be similar to the situation of her daughter-in-law, Masako, who also underwent several episodes of depression due to the pressures of her position.

In June 2019, it was announced that Michiko had heart valve abnormalities and an irregular pulse, though she was reported to be well enough to undergo cataract operations. In August 2019, it was revealed that she was diagnosed with early-stage breast cancer a month prior while undergoing a routine medical appointment, and was scheduled to have the growth removed. In September 2019, it was reported by The Japan Times that the surgery was successful. On her 86th birthday in October 2020, it was revealed that she had been suffering from a mild fever since May. She was diagnosed with deep vein thrombosis in August 2022 following the discovery of a clot in her right calf.

On 3 June 2024, Michiko tested positive for COVID-19 but recovered after a week.

On 7 October 2024, she underwent surgery after breaking her femur during a fall at the Sentō Imperial Palace of the Akasaka Estate in Tokyo. The following day, 8 October, it was announced the surgery was successful and that she would remain in hospital until the following Tuesday.

== Issue ==
Michiko and Akihito have three children (two sons and a daughter).

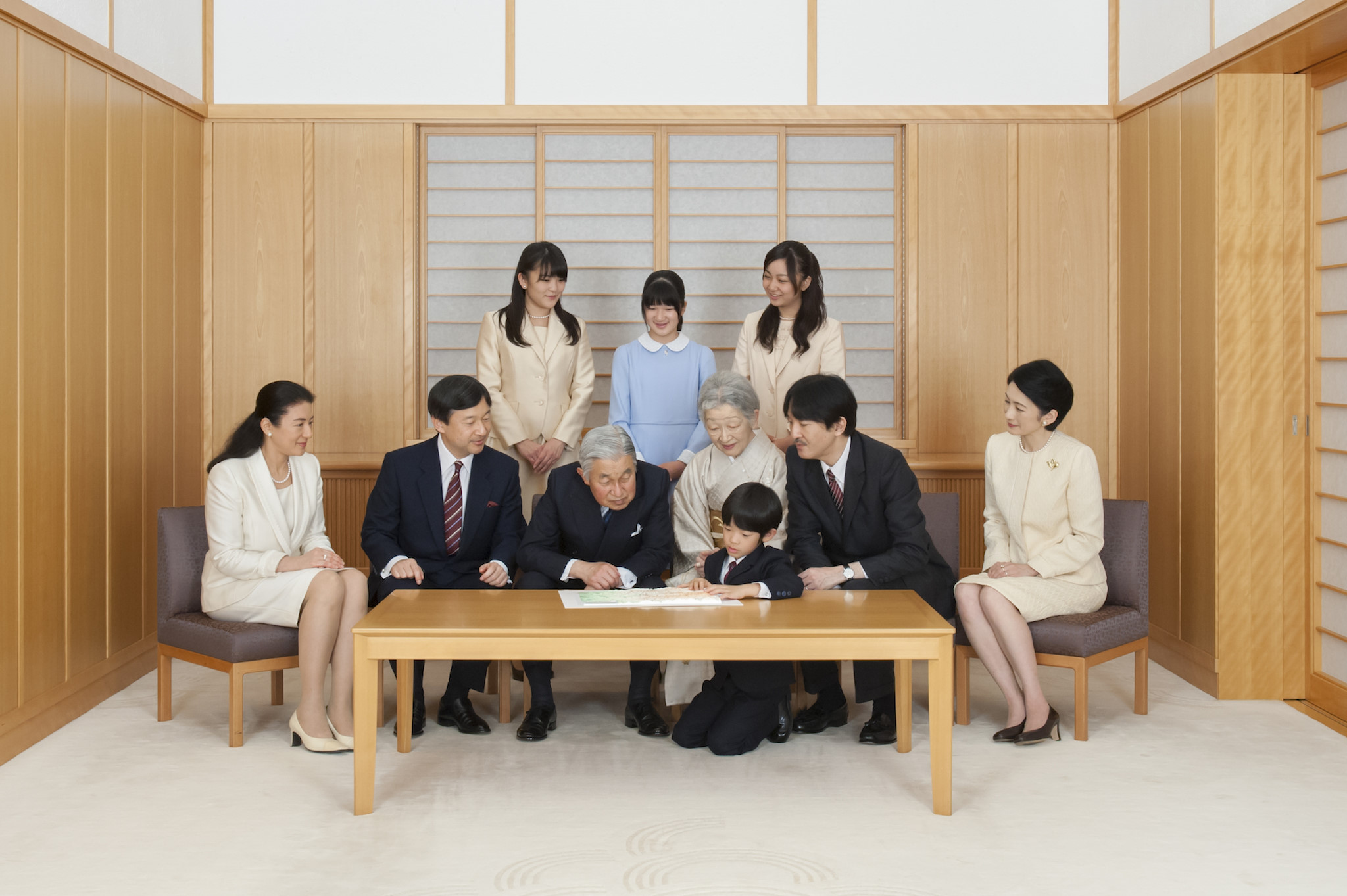
The Emperor and Empress with their family in November 2013

Name	Birth	Marriage		Children
Name	Birth	Date	Spouse	Children
Naruhito, Emperor of Japan (Naruhito, Prince Hiro)	23 February 1960 (age 66)	9 June 1993	Masako Owada	Aiko, Princess Toshi
Fumihito, Crown Prince of Japan (Fumihito, Prince Aya)	30 November 1965 (age 60)	29 June 1990	Kiko Kawashima	Mako Komuro; Princess Kako; Prince Hisahito
Sayako Kuroda (Sayako, Princess Nori)	18 April 1969 (age 57)	15 November 2005	Yoshiki Kuroda	None

== Titles, styles and honours ==
=== Titles and styles ===
- 10 April 1959 – 7 January 1989: Her Imperial Highness The Crown Princess (皇太子妃殿下 Kōtaishi-hi Denka)
- 7 January 1989 – 30 April 2019: Her Majesty The Empress (皇后陛下 Kōgō Heika)
- 1 May 2019 – present: Her Majesty The Empress Emerita (上皇后陛下 Jōkōgō Heika)

=== Honours ===
- Austria: Grand Star of the Decoration for Services to the Republic of Austria
- Belgium: Grand Cordon of the Order of Leopold I
- Denmark: Knight of the Order of the Elephant
- France: Grand Cross of the National Order of Merit
- Germany: Grand Cross Special Class of the Order of Merit of the Federal Republic of Germany
- Indonesia: Star of Mahaputera, 1st Class
- (Kingdom of Nepal) Nepalese Royal Family:
  - Member of the Order of the Benevolent Ruler
  - Recipient of the King Birendra Coronation Medal
- Netherlands: Knight Grand Cross of the Order of the Netherlands Lion
- Norway: Grand Cross of the Royal Norwegian Order of Saint Olav
- Philippines: Member of the Order of Gabriela Silang
- Poland: Knight of the Order of the White Eagle
- Portugal:
  - Grand Cross of the Military Order of Saint James of the Sword
  - Grand Cross of the Order of Prince Henry
- Spain:
  - Dame Grand Cross of the Royal and Distinguished Spanish Order of Charles III
  - Dame Grand Cross of the Royal Order of Isabella the Catholic
- Sweden: Knight of the Royal Order of the Seraphim
- Thailand:
  - Dame of the Most Illustrious Order of the Royal House of Chakri
  - Commemorative Medal on the Occasion of the 60th Anniversary of the Accession to the Throne of H.M. King Bhumibol Adulyadej

=== Honorary positions ===
- Honorary president of the Japanese Red Cross Society (passed on to her daughter-in-law Masako)

Japanese royalty
Preceded by Princess Nagako	Empress consort of Japan; 1989–2019	Succeeded by Owada Masako
