= Akasaka Estate =

Land in Akasaka, Tokyo

- 赤坂御用地
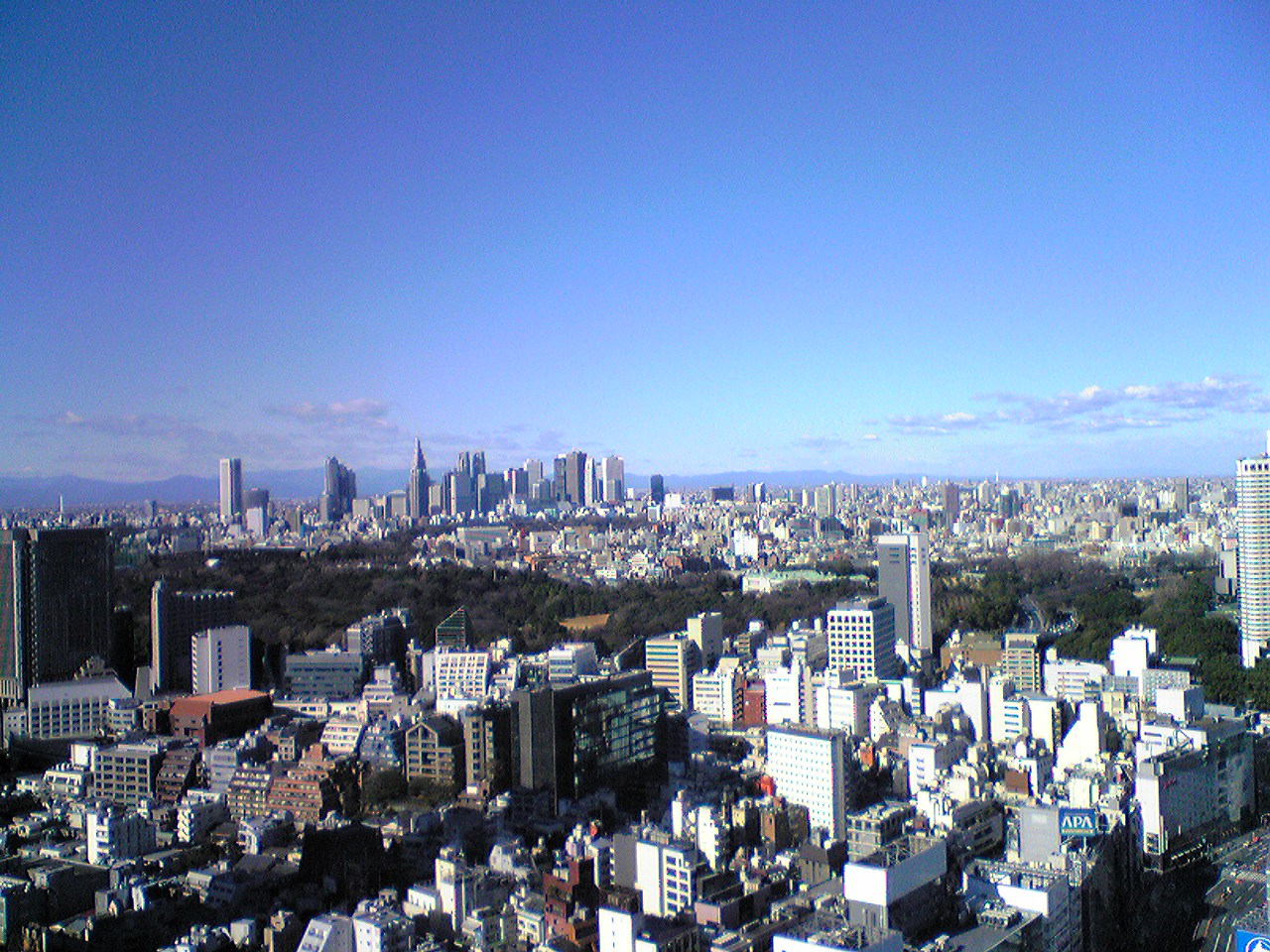
- Akasaka Estate from Sanno Park Tower
- Interactive map of Akasaka Estate
- Type: Imperial Estate
- Location: Tokyo, Japan
- Coordinates: 35.6782982°N 139.7278949°E
- Area: 508,920 m^{2} (5,478,000 sq ft)

The Akasaka Estate (赤坂御用地, Akasaka Goyōchi) is a park-like Japanese Imperial Estate located in the district of Moto-Akasaka, Minato Special Ward, Tokyo. It is the site of several major existing and former Imperial residences. Besides Prince Hitachi, who lives in Higashi, Shibuya, many members of the Imperial Family have their official residence on this estate, including the Emperor Emeritus. The estate is not accessible to the general public.

== Overview ==
Six residences are currently located on the grounds of the estate. At its rough center is a Japanese garden, the Akasaka Imperial Gardens (赤坂御苑, Akasaka-gyoen), where the Emperor holds a garden party (園遊会, Enyūkai) twice annually, to which are invited around 2,000 political figures, diplomatic representatives, and celebrities from various fields.

There are six main access gates. The Main Gate (正門) and the Samegahashi Gate (鮫が橋門) are along Road 414 on the northern side, the East Gate (東門) and the Tatsumi Gate (巽門) face east, the South Gate (南門) faces Aoyama Dori, and the West Gate (西門) faces Gaien-Higashi Dori on the southwestern side of the estate.

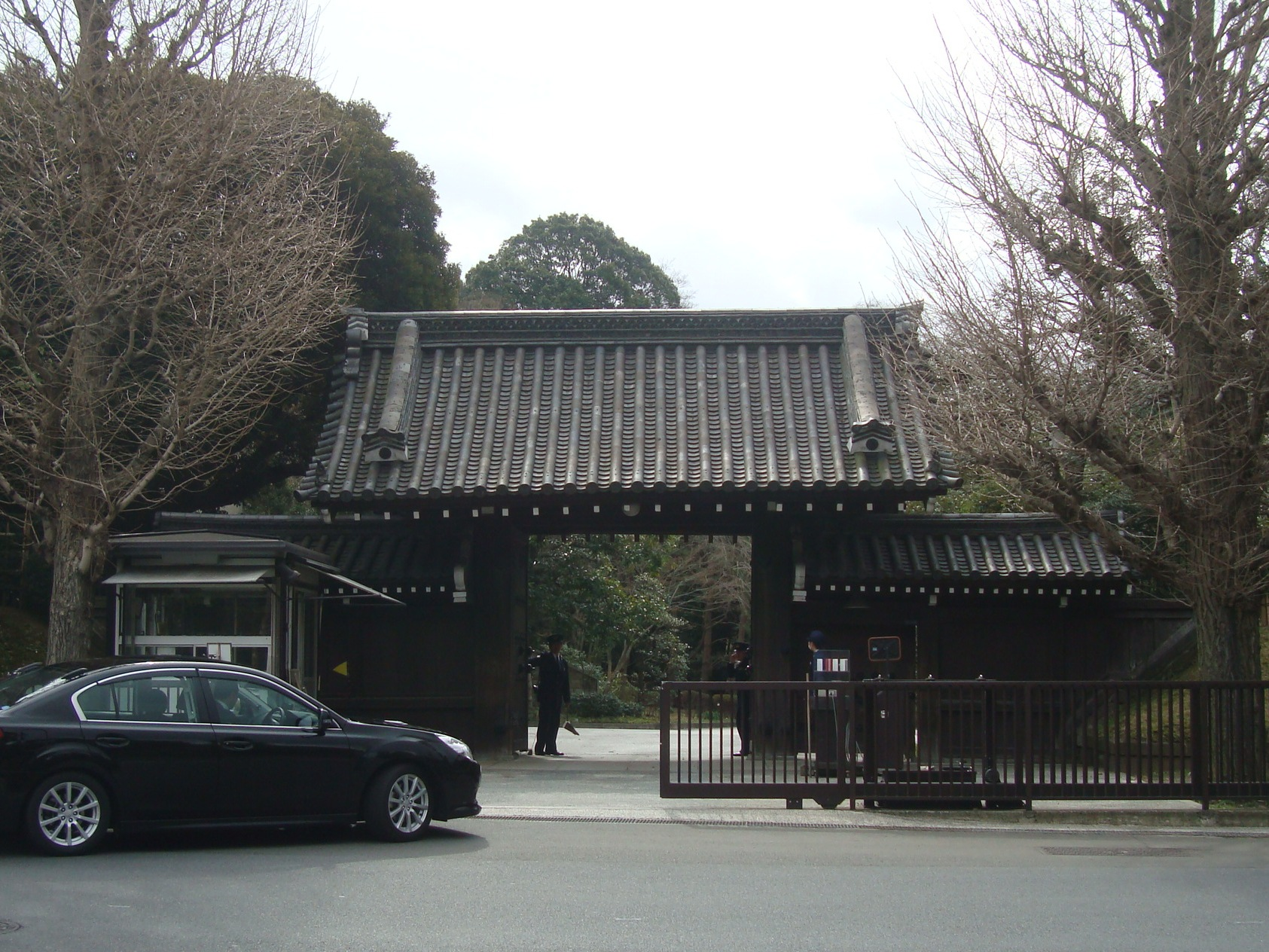
Samegahashi Gate

== History ==
The estate was once on the grounds of the spare residence (中屋敷) in Edo of the powerful Tokugawa clan of Kii, granted in 1632, which at 145,381 tsubo was one of the largest daimyo residences of the city. In 1823, a fire destroyed the main residence of the clan in Kojimachi, turning that spare into their main Edo residence. During the Meiji Restoration, the head of the clan, Tokugawa Mochitsugu, became a Kazoku noble and lived in the estate. In 1873, a fire destroyed Nishinomaru Palace within Edo Castle, where the Emperor was staying. Mochitsugu opened that very day the estate’s Akasaka Residence (赤坂邸, Akasakatei) to the Emperor, who lived there for 15 years. Another residence on the southwest of the estate was given to Empress Dowager Eishō, as the Emperor wanted to have her nearby.

After that point, the grounds of the estate have been used to build several residences and palaces, be it for crown princes, Empresses dowager, or close family members.

On the north side of the estate, on the site of the initial Akasaka Residence, Tōgū Palace was built in 1909 and became the Geihinkan. After the Second World War, the Geihinkan was split from the estate and became National property, whereas the remainder is Imperial property.

== Current residences of the estate ==
There are currently six imperial residences on the estate, in clockwise order:

=== Akasaka Palace ===
The Akasaka Palace (赤坂御所), formerly Tōgū Palace, was the residence of the Emperor, the Empress and Princess Aiko, until they moved to Fukiage Palace in the Imperial Palace complex. This palace on the northern side of the estate is a two-floor, reinforced concrete structure with 72 rooms, built in 1960 based on a design by Yoshirō Taniguchi. The palace is used as the Sentō Imperial Palace (仙洞御所) for Akihito, the Emperor Emeritus.

=== Akasaka East Palace ===
Located roughly 200m to the south of the Yushintei (the Japanese-style annexe of the Geihinkan) Akasaka East Palace (赤坂東邸, Akasaka Higashitei) was completed in 1984 and is mainly used as a temporary residence for Imperial family members during various construction works. Late Prince Takamado used it while his own residence was being built. It was refurbished in 1989 by adding offices and dependencies and was used as a temporary palace for Naruhito several times. There are plans to include this palace in the nearby Akishino residence.

=== Akishino Residence ===
The Akishino Residence (秋篠宮邸, Akishinomiyatei) is located on the south-eastern side of the estate. The residential complex is an aggregation of several former imperial residences and buildings renovated over the years: the Chichibu Residence first built in 1972, a housing for dry nurses of the Ministry of the Imperial Household built in 1931 (where Kazuko Takatsukasa, daughter of Emperor Showa lived from 1968 to 1989) and an expansion built in 2000, further expanded for the birth of Hisahito. Prince Akishino moved into the building in 1990.

From 2019, the complex was being refurbished and renovated; works lasted until 2022. The family lives a few meters to the East in a temporary palace built on purpose, called Gokagusho (御仮寓所; litt. "Temporary Residence").

Crown Prince Akishino, his consort Kiko, their younger daughter Princess Kako, and their son Prince Hisahito live in this residence.

=== East Mikasa Residence ===
The East Mikasa Residence (三笠宮東邸, Misakanomiya-Totei) is located southwest of the Akishino Residence. This 2 floor building was achieved in 1982 as a residence for late Prince Tomohito, who died in 2012. This 2 floor building has 15 rooms, not taking into account the handmaid dependencies. At the time of the Prince's death, Princess Nobuko was living separately from her husband since 2009, leaving the residence to their two daughters, Princess Akiko and Princess Yoko. When the prince died, the Mikasa imperial lineage was merged and the building was renamed the East Mikasa Residence.

=== Mikasa Residence ===
Located south of the estate, the Mikasa Residence (三笠宮東邸, Misakanomiyatei) had been in use since 1970 by the late Prince Mikasa and his consort, the late Princess Yuriko.

=== Takamado Residence ===
The Takamado Residence (高円宮低, Takamadomiyatei) is on the south side of the estate, next to the Mikasa Residence. It was finished in 1986 as a residence for late Prince Takamado. The residence is a 2-floor Art Deco hipped roof reinforced-concrete building. It has 19 rooms (including offices and handmaid dependencies) and a garden with a pergola. Two of Prince Takamado's daughters (Noriko Senge and Ayako Moriya) have left the imperial family after their marriage to commoners, leaving the widow Princess Hisako, and one daughter, Princess Tsuguko, as remaining members of the branch in the imperial family.
