= Takanawa Residence =

Japanese imperial residence

Takanawa Imperial Residence
- 高輪皇族邸
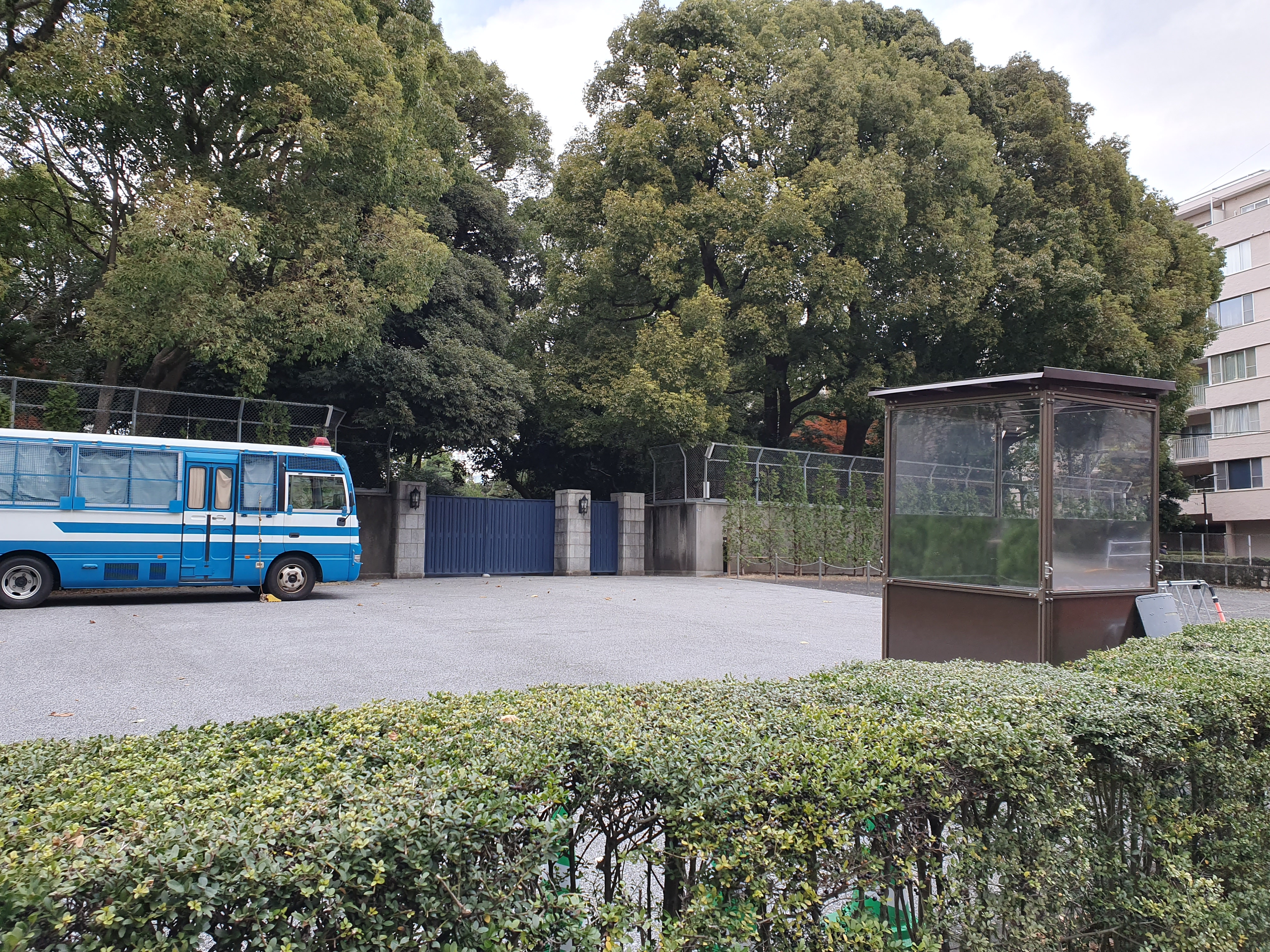
- Interactive map of the Takanawa Imperial Residence area

General information
- Type: Imperial Residence
- Location: 1-14-1 Takanawa Minato-ku Tokyo, Tokyo, Japan
- Coordinates: 35.64055°N 139.73611°E
- Completed: 1973

Design and construction
- Known for: Residence of Emperor Emeritus Akihito and Empress Emerita Michiko

The Takanawa Imperial Residence (高輪皇族邸, Takanawa Kōzokutei) is an Imperial residence in Tokyo.

From 1931 to 2004, it was the residence of Nobuhito, Prince Takamatsu, and his spouse, Kikuko, Princess Takamatsu. On 31 March 2020, the Emperor Emeritus Akihito and the Empress Emerita Michiko moved in. The official name of the residence was then changed to Sento Karigosho (仙洞仮御所; litt. "Temporary Emeritus Imperial Palace").

== History ==
The residence was the site of the secondary Edo residence of the Hosokawa clan. In 1891, it was chosen to be the residence of Masako, Princess Tsune and Fusako, Princess Kane, two daughters of Emperor Meiji. Hirohito resided there as the Crown Prince between 1913 and 1924. It became the residence of his younger brother Nobuhito in 1931, and a building in Tudor style and a Japanese style building were built. They survived the war, but part of the grounds were confiscated. On those grounds were built the Takamatsu Junior high school and public residences.

The western style building was dismantled in 1972, and a new reinforced concrete residence was built in its place. Nobuhito's widow Kikuko resided there until her death in 2004, after which the residence was unused.

== Temporary Emeritus Imperial Palace ==
The Takanawa residence was chosen as a temporary palace for Akihito and Michiko during the refurbishment of the Akasaka Palace (current Togu palace), which will be their Sentō Imperial Palace (仙洞御所; litt. "Emeritus Imperial Palace"). It became the Sentō Karigosho (仙洞仮御所; litt. "Temporary Emeritus Imperial Palace") when they moved in on March 31, 2020.
