= Tōgū Palace =

Any residence of the imperial crown prince of Japan

Coordinates: 35°40′41″N 139°43′29″E

In Japan, the Tōgū Palace (東宮, Tōgū, lit. "East Palace") traditionally does not refer to a single location, but to any residence of the imperial crown prince. As Prince Akishino, the current heir presumptive, is not a direct male descendant of the Emperor and not an imperial crown prince himself, there is currently no Tōgū Palace in Japan and there will not be one until there is another imperial crown prince.

== Akasaka Palace ==
Akasaka Palace
- 赤坂御所
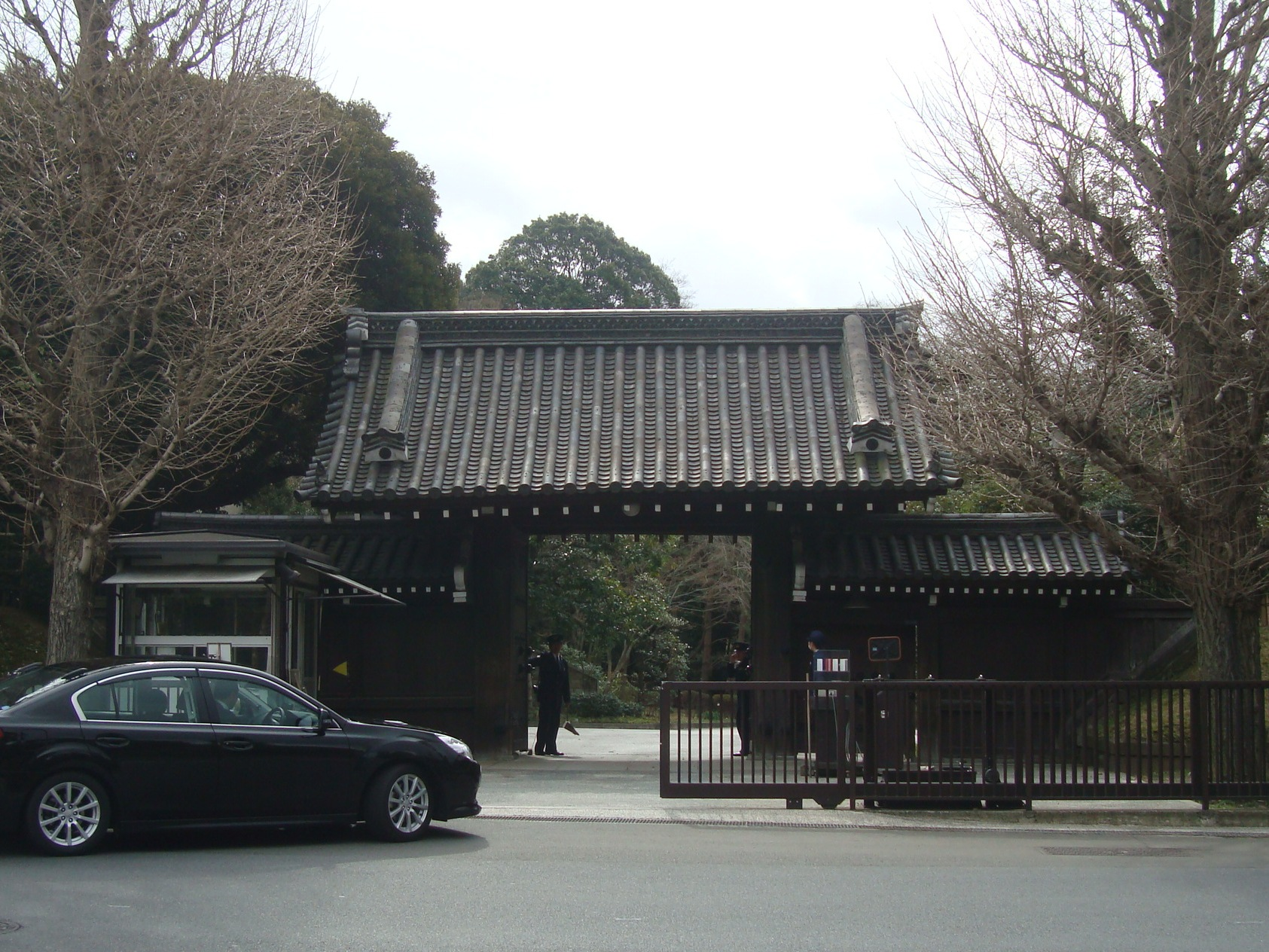
- Samegahashi-mon Gate of Akasaka imperial estate
- Former names: 東宮御所

General information
- Address: 2-1-8 Moto-Akasaka Minato-ku Tokyo
- Country: Japan
- Completed: 27 April 1960

Technical details
- Floor area: 5460
- Known for: The residence of an Imperial crown prince.

The palace where then-crown Prince Naruhito resided before his ascension to the Chrysantheum throne on 1 May 2019 was called Tōgū Palace, but changed its name to Akasaka Palace (赤坂御所, Akasaka-gosho) when Naruhito became emperor. The Emperor used this palace as his primary residence until he moved to the Fukiage Palace of the Imperial Palace in September 2021.

Similarly, Akihito lived in this same palace when Hirohito died. Between his accession to the throne in 1989 and his moving to the Fukiage Palace in December 1993 the palace was also called Akasaka Palace.

The Akasaka Palace is located in the Akasaka Estate in Moto-Akasaka and is not accessible to the public.

=== Overview ===
The site of the palace used to house the Ōmiya Palace (大宮御所, Ōmiya-gosho), the residence of Empress Teimei, the consort of Emperor Taishō. After her death at the palace in 1951, the site was converted to the crown prince's residence. A reinforced-concrete building, designed by Yoshirō Taniguchi was achieved in 1960. It saw the first wave of expansion works in 1978. A Japanese Garden was added in 1994 for the arrival of the crown princess Masako. Additional renewal works took place in 1997 (installation of an elevator for wheelchair users, barrier-free design, seismic reinforcement). Works for a kid's area took place in 2001 as Masako was pregnant.

A major series of renewal works took place for a year in 2008–2009, during which time the Prince lived temporarily in the smaller Akasaka East Palace (赤坂東邸) of the estate, which was renamed for the occasion Temporary Togu Palace (東宮仮御所, Togu karigosho). Some solar panels were installed on the roof, as well as LED lighting.

The palace has 72 rooms (12 reception rooms, 38 office rooms, 22 residence rooms). It has two floors and one basement floor.

== Historical Tōgū Palaces ==
=== Early Tōgū Palaces ===
In the Heian Palace, the Tōgū palace was located on the eastern side of the Dairi (内裏), the inner palace. Towards the beginning of the 10th century, the Shōyōsha (昭陽舎), located inside the Dairi, came to be generally used as the Tōgū palace.

=== Tōgū palace of Asahito ===
Asahito became Imperial crown Prince in 1683 and from 1686 used a different palace than the Imperial palace for his Tōgū palace, located where the Kyōto Sentō palace is.

=== Ohana Palace of Kyoto Imperial Palace ===
After that, the Ohana Palace (御花御殿, Ohana Goten, litt. "Flower palace"), located inside the Kyōto Imperial Palace itself, was used as the Tōgū palace.

=== Tōgū palace of Yoshihito ===
The construction of a Tōgū palace for Yoshihito (future emperor Taisho) began in 1899, and was achieved in 1909. The building is now the Geihinkan.

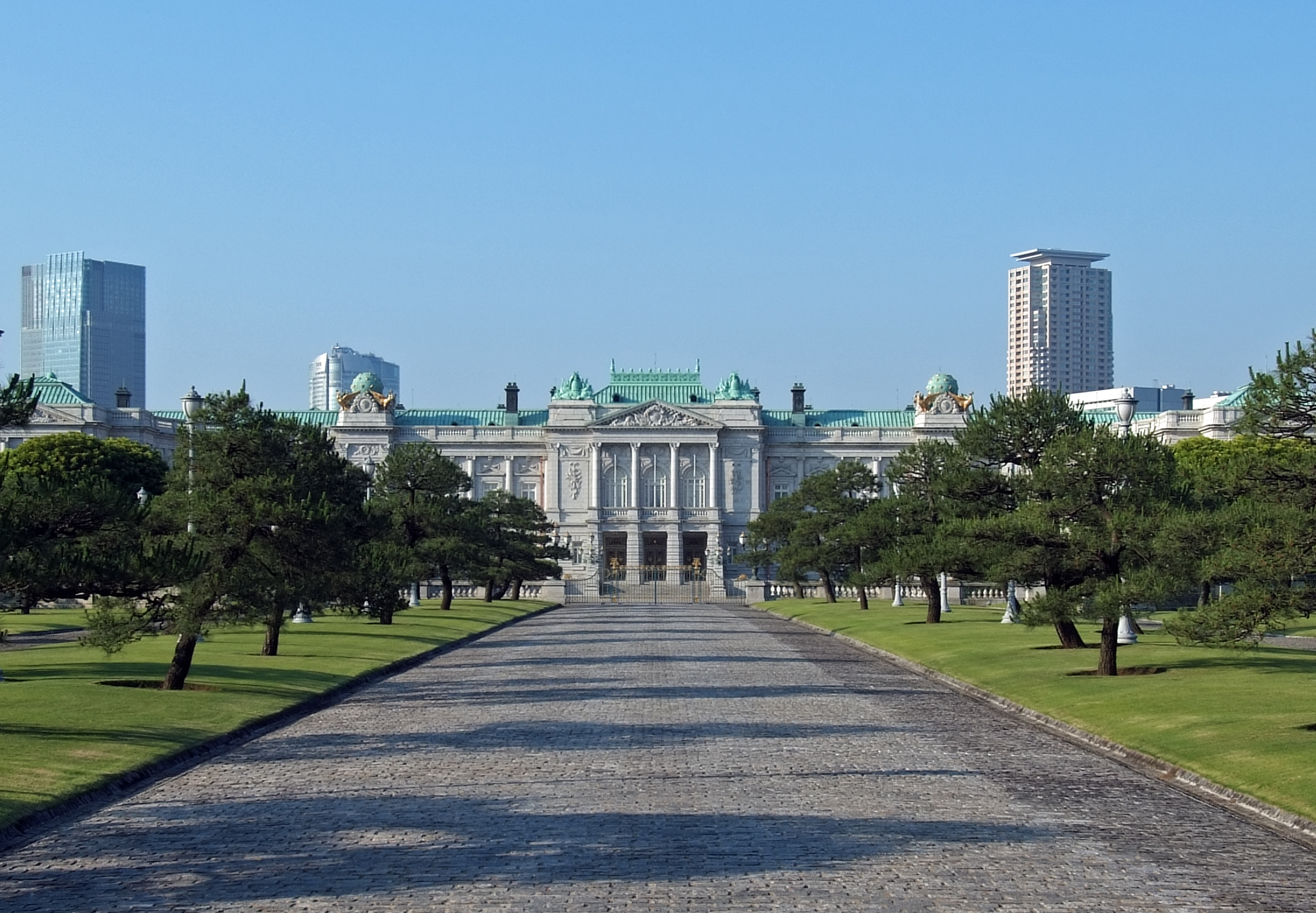
Akasaka Palace

=== Takanawa Residence ===
The Takanawa Residence was used as the Tōgū palace for the early years of Hirohito, future emperor Shōwa. After his wedding, he moved to (then named) Akasaka Palace (current Geihinkan).
