= Hidesaburō Shōda =

Japanese businessman

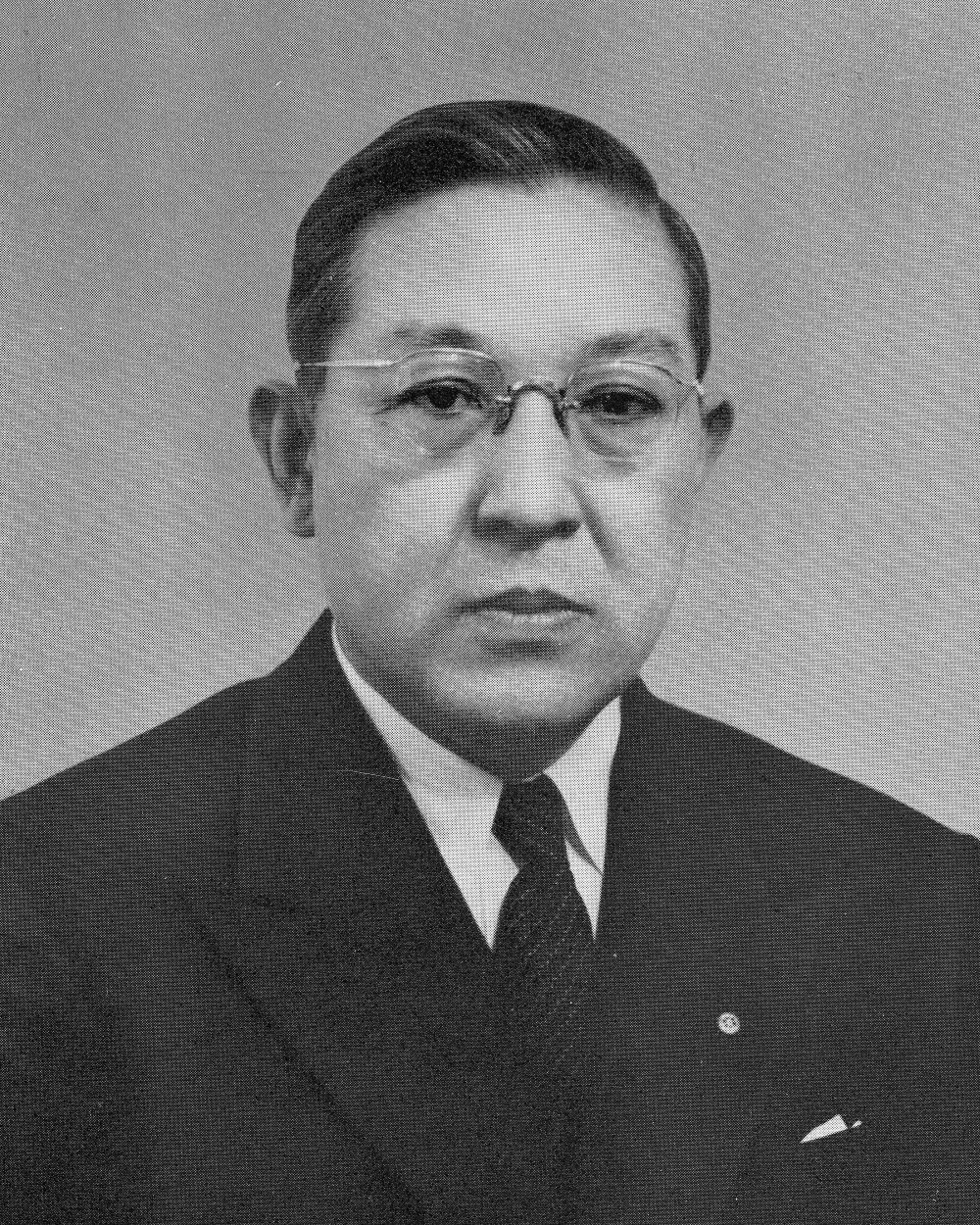

President of Nisshin Seifun Group
- In office 1945–1973
- Preceded by: Yuizo Hoshino
- Succeeded by: Yoshio Ishii

Chairman of Nisshin Seifun Group
- In office 11 May 1973 – June 1981
- Preceded by: Teiichiro Shōda
- Succeeded by: Takashi Saeki

Personal details
- Born: 21 September 1903 Tatebayashi Town, Ōra District, Japan
- Died: 18 June 1999 (aged 95)
- Spouse: Fumiko Shōda
- Children: Iwao Shōda; Michiko, Empress Emerita of Japan; Emiko Shōda; Osamu Shōda
- Parents: Teiichiro Shōda (father); Kinu Shōda (mother)
- Education: Tokyo University of Commerce
- Occupation: Businessman

Hidesaburō Shōda (正田 英三郎, Shōda Hidesaburō; 21 September 1903 – 18 June 1999) was a Japanese businessman. He served as the president and later honorary chairman of Nisshin Seifun Group, the country's largest flour milling company. He was the father of Empress Michiko, is the father in law of Emperor Akihito, and the maternal grandfather of Emperor Naruhito. He was the third son of Teiichiro Shōda, the founder of the Nisshin Seifun Group. The Shōda family is prominent in both industrial and academic circles.
