= Akasaka Palace =

State guest house in Japan

- 赤坂離宮 (Japanese)
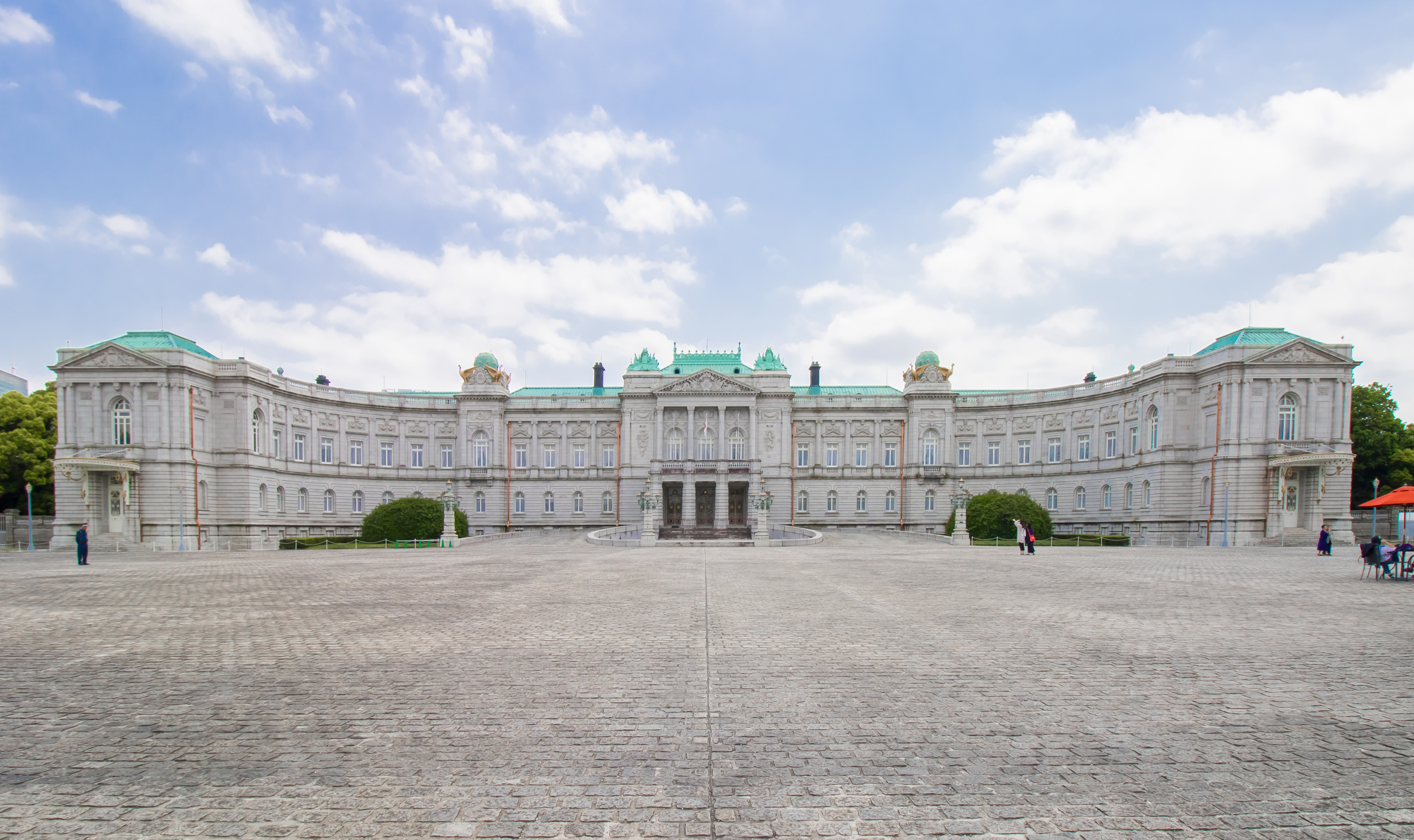
- Akasaka Palace

- Location within Japan
- 35°40′48″N 139°43′43″E
- Location: Moto Akasaka, Minato, Tokyo, Japan

History
- Built: 1899–1909
- Built for: Crown Prince; Daijō Tennō

Site notes
- Area: 15,000 m^{2} (160,000 sq ft) (floor space); 117,000 m^{2} (1,260,000 sq ft) (site)

National Treasure of Japan
- Designated: 2009

Akasaka Palace (赤坂離宮, Akasaka Rikyū) is a state guest house (迎賓館, geihinkan) of the government of Japan. Other state guesthouses of the government include the Kyoto State Guest House.

The palace was originally built as the Imperial Palace for the Crown Prince (東宮御所, Tōgū Gosho) in 1909. The palace is designated as an official accommodation for visiting state dignitaries by the government of Japan. Located in the Moto-Akasaka, Minato, Tokyo, the building took on its present function in 1974, having previously been an imperial detached palace. In 2009 the palace was designated as a National Treasure of Japan.

== Overview ==
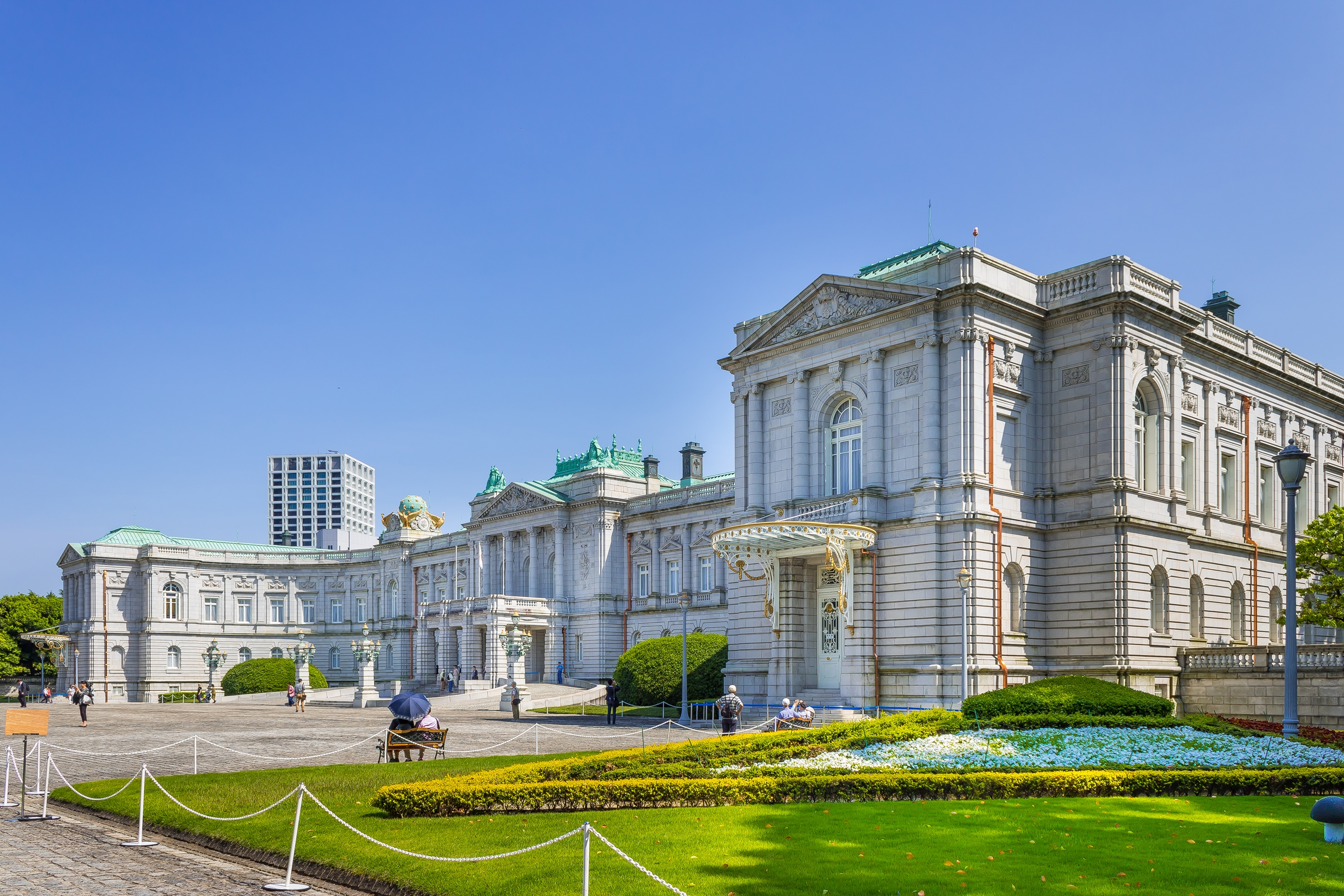
The main building and the main garden

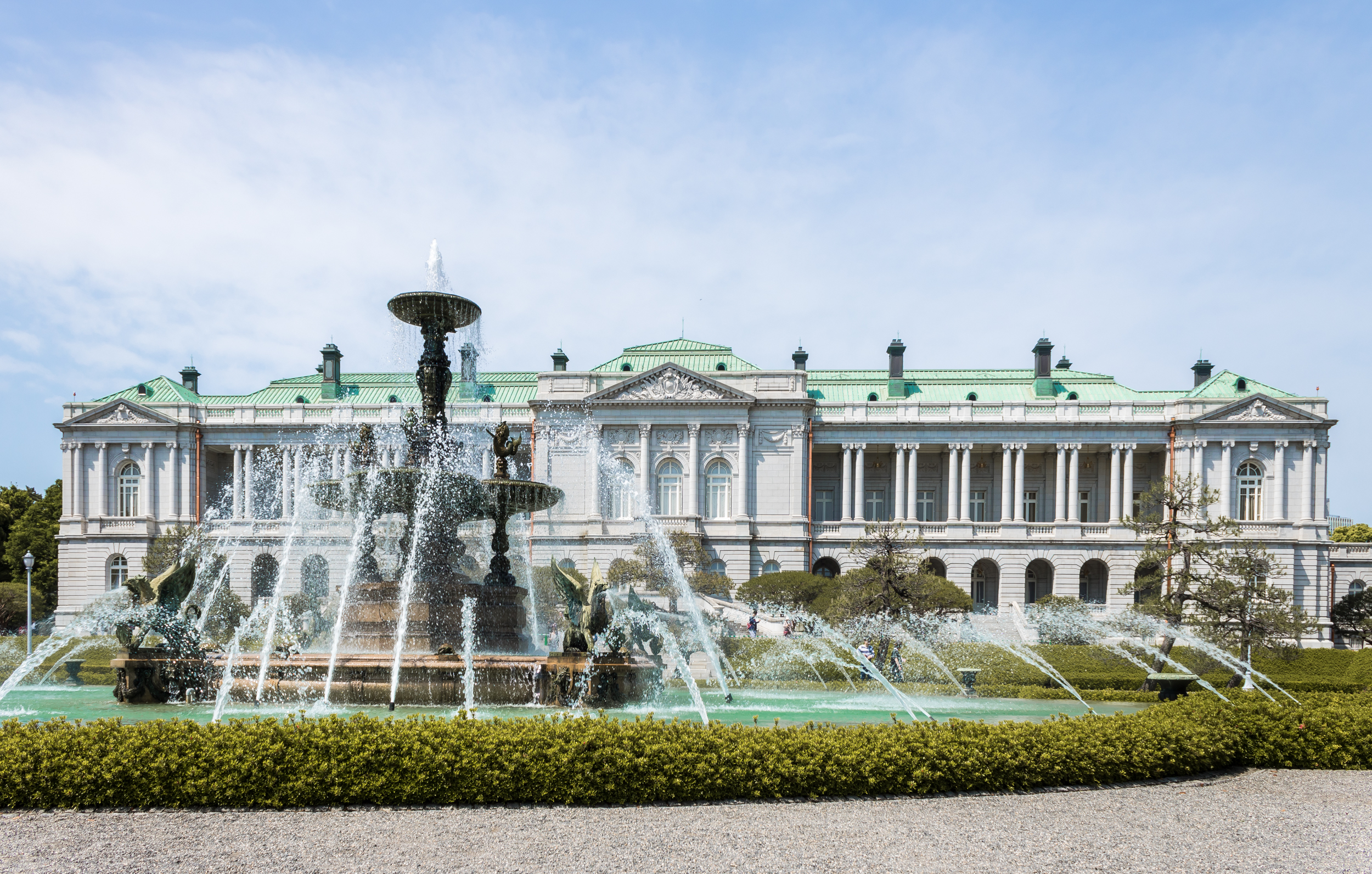
The main building and the fountain

The building's address is Tokyo, Minato-ku, Moto-Akasaka-chome No. 1.

The building has 15,000 square metres (160,000 sq ft) of floor space, and together with a smaller structure in the Japanese style, occupies a 117,000-square-metre (1,260,000 sq ft) site.

The main building is a Neo-Baroque style Western building, resembling in particular the Hofburg Palace and the Palace of Versailles. It is one of the largest buildings constructed during the Meiji period.

The palace is surrounded by a footpath unobstructed by road crossings. The footpath is approximately 3.25 km long (roughly 2 miles).

The railway station nearest the Palace is Yotsuya Station.

== History ==
The territory that Akasaka Palace now occupies was part of the residence of Kishū Domain, one of the major branches (gosanke) of the ruling Tokugawa clan, during the Tokugawa period. After the Meiji Restoration, the Owari presented the land to the Imperial Household.

Designed by the architect Katayama Tōkuma (片山 東熊), who studied French architecture under Josiah Conder at the Imperial College of Engineering, the French Neo-Baroque structure was constructed between 1899 and 1909 as a residence for the Crown Prince. Originally it was named Tōgū Palace (ja. lit. "Palace for the Crown Prince") but was later renamed Akasaka Palace when the Crown Prince's residence was moved. Regent Crown Prince Hirohito resided at Akasaka Palace from September 1923 until September 1928, two months before his enthronement. The move was intended to be temporary, but lasted five years. During the renovation of his contemporary residence, Hirohito intended to lodge temporarily at Akasaka Palace, moving in on August 28, 1923. Four days later, Japan was hit by the Great Kantō earthquake on September 1. During his residence in Akasaka Palace, Crown Prince Hirohito married, and fathered two daughters, Princess Sachiko (who died at the age of 6 months) and Princess Shigeko.

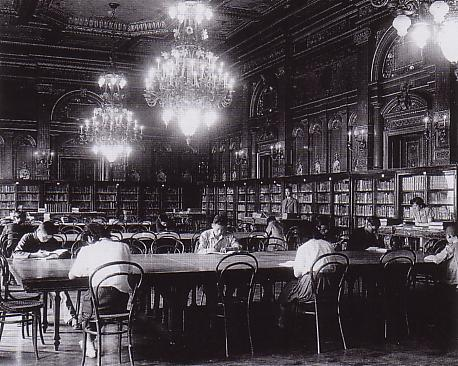
Akasaka Palace as the National Diet Library, circa 1948.

After the Second World War, the Government of Japan relieved the Imperial Household of Akasaka Palace. Several governmental offices were installed in the palace, including the National Diet Library which was founded in 1948, Cabinet Legislation Bureau and Organizing Committee of Tokyo Olympics 1964.

As the post-war occupation of Japan after the Second World War ended and the country went back to the international stage, a State Guest House was needed. The former residence of Prince Asaka, currently Tokyo Metropolitan Teien Art Museum, was used as the state guest house for a brief period, but it was too small for that purpose. It was decided in 1967 to renovate the former Akasaka Palace as the new state guest house. The renovation was led by architect Togo Murano, took more than five years and 10.8 billion yen, and was completed in 1974.

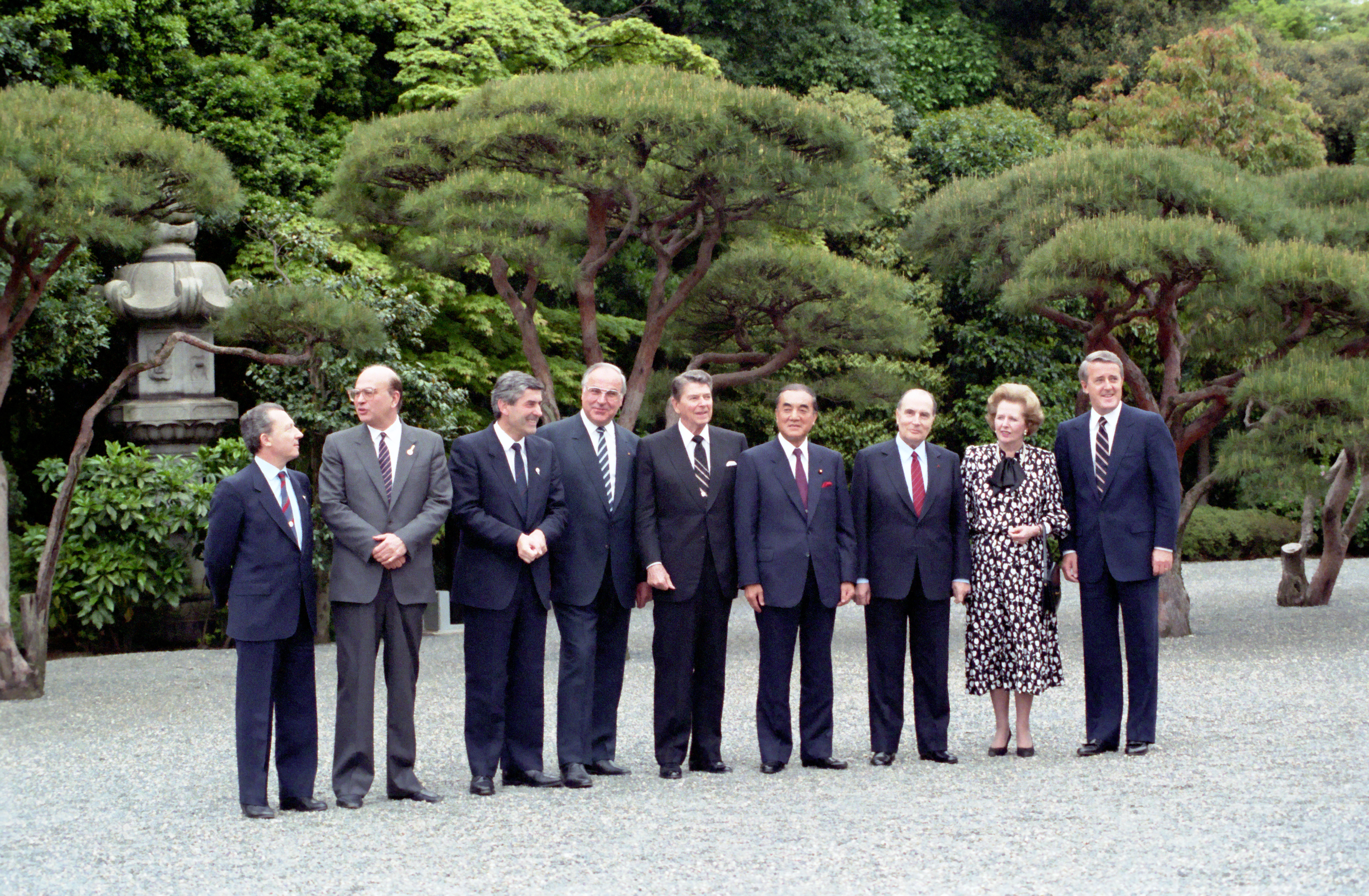
The 1986 G7 summit, the second G7 summit the palace hosted

The first official state guest at the renovated palace was Gerald Ford in 1974, which was the first visit of the incumbent President of the United States to Japan. Since then, the palace has provided accommodations for state and official guests and a venue for international conferences, which have included the G7 summit meetings (1979, 1986 and 1993) and APEC summits.

The venue was closed from 2006 to 2009 for renovation, and was reopened in April 2009. In December 2009, the main building, the main gate and the garden with fountain were designated as a National Treasure of Japan. It was the first designation of assets after the Meiji Restoration as a National Treasure of Japan.

== Gallery ==
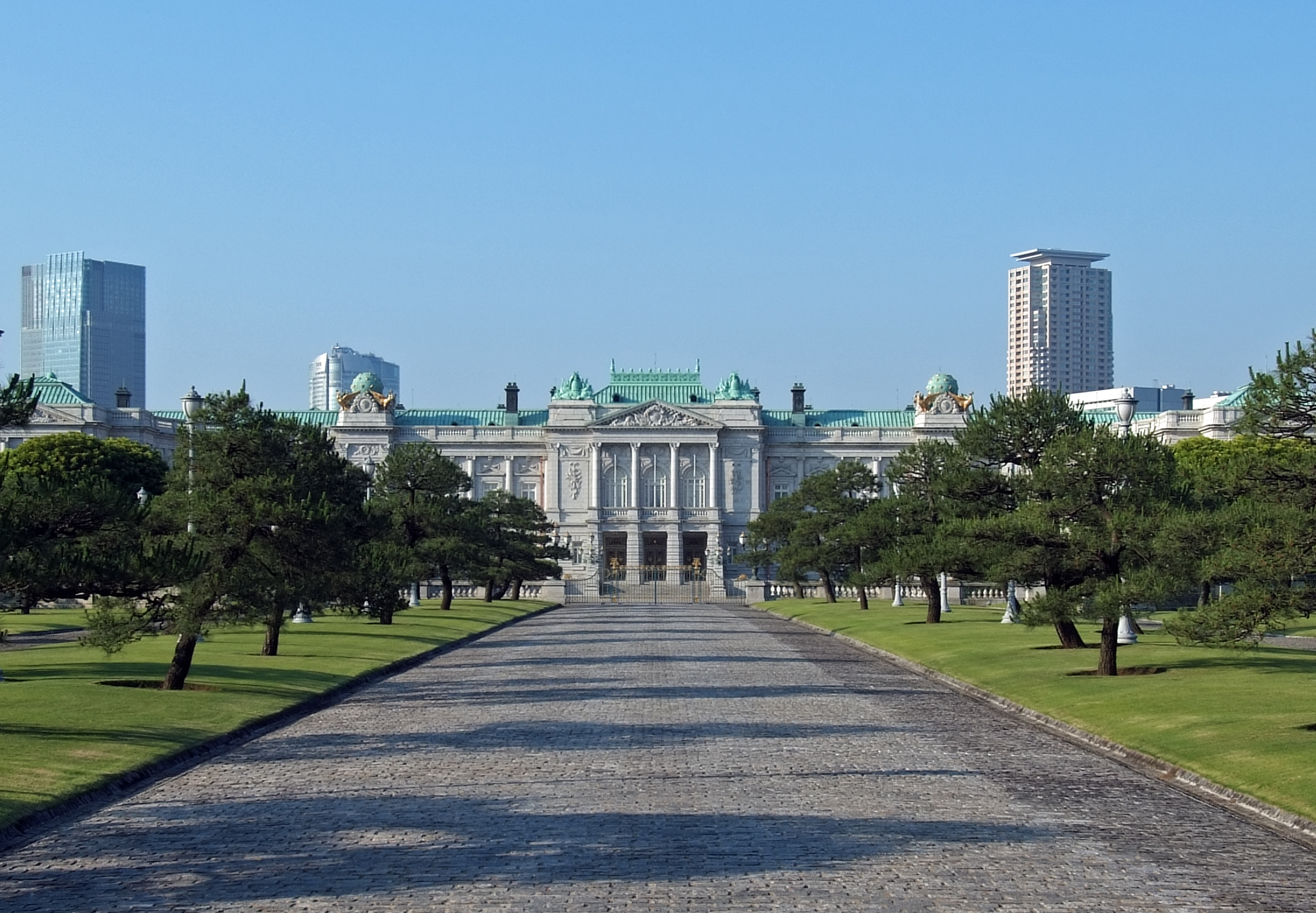
Main entrance and garden

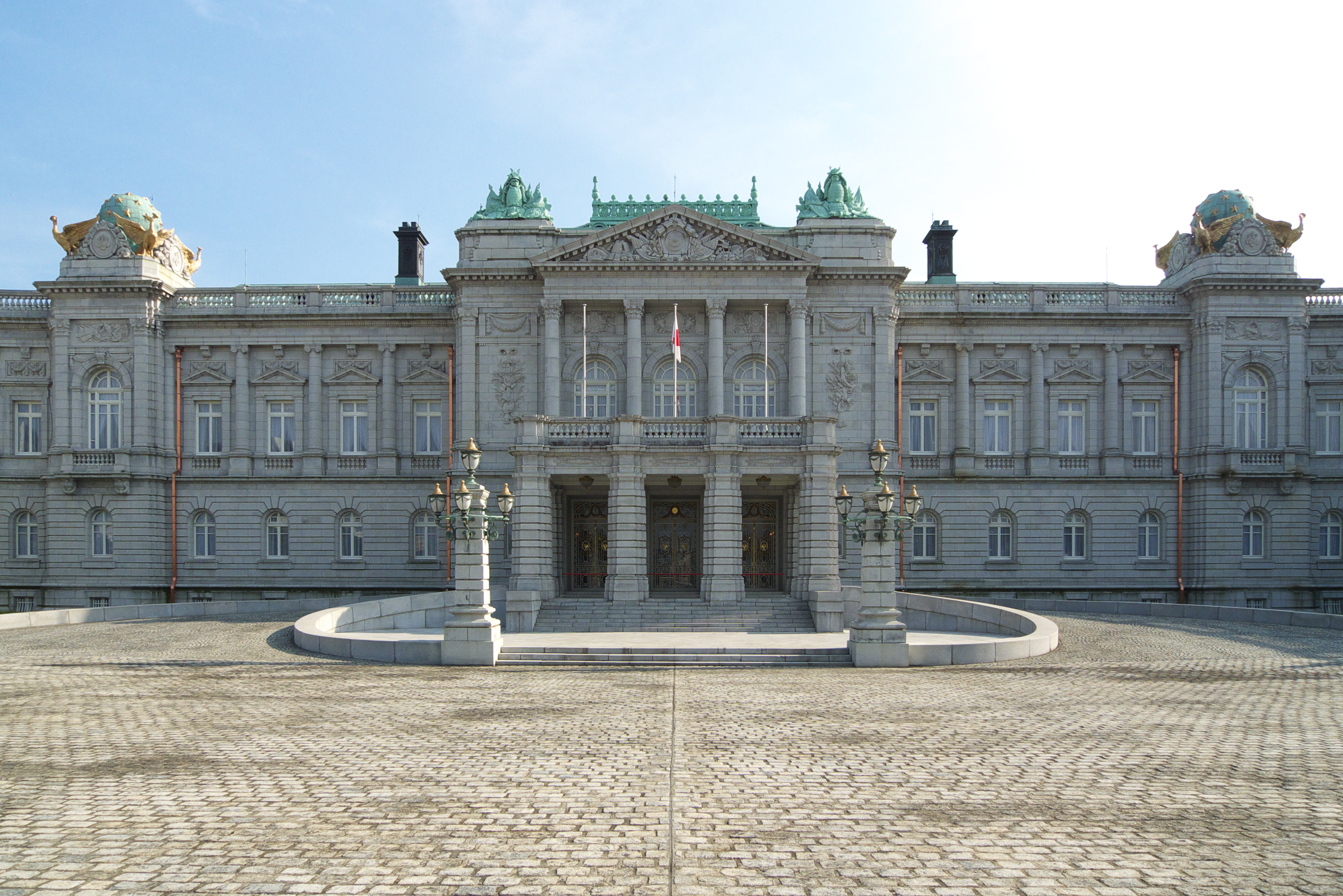
Main entrance

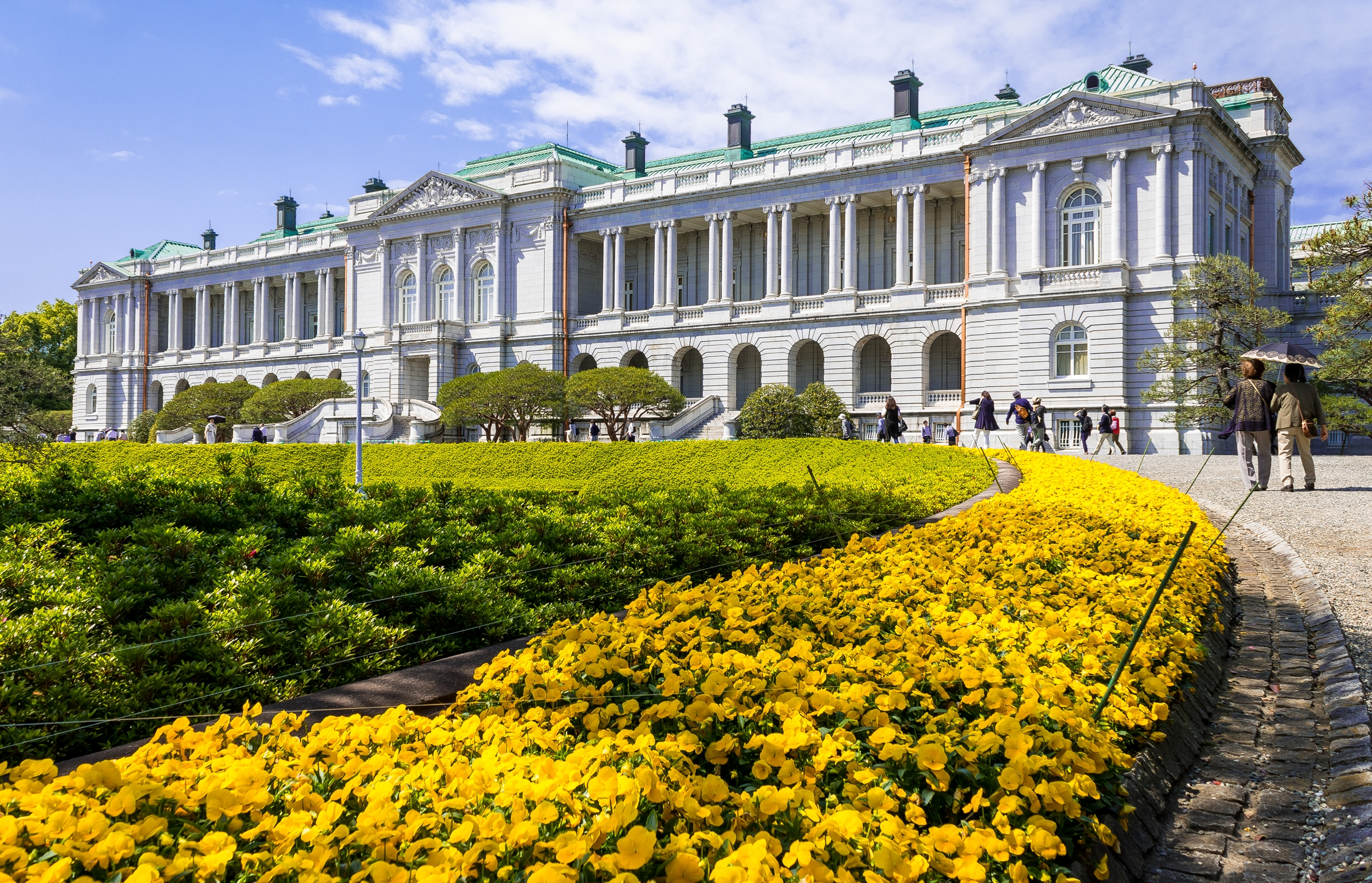
Main Garden

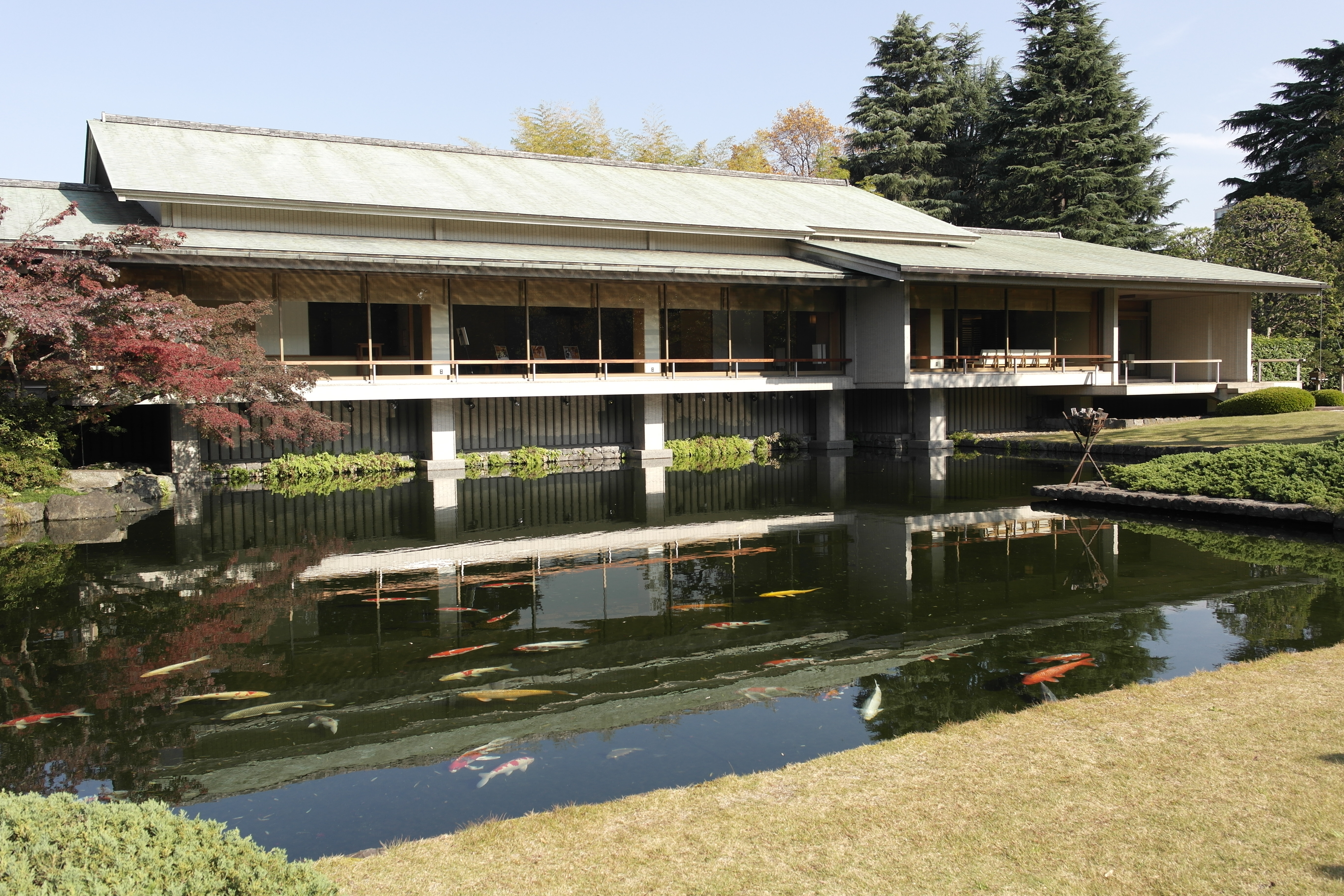
Annex Yushin-tei

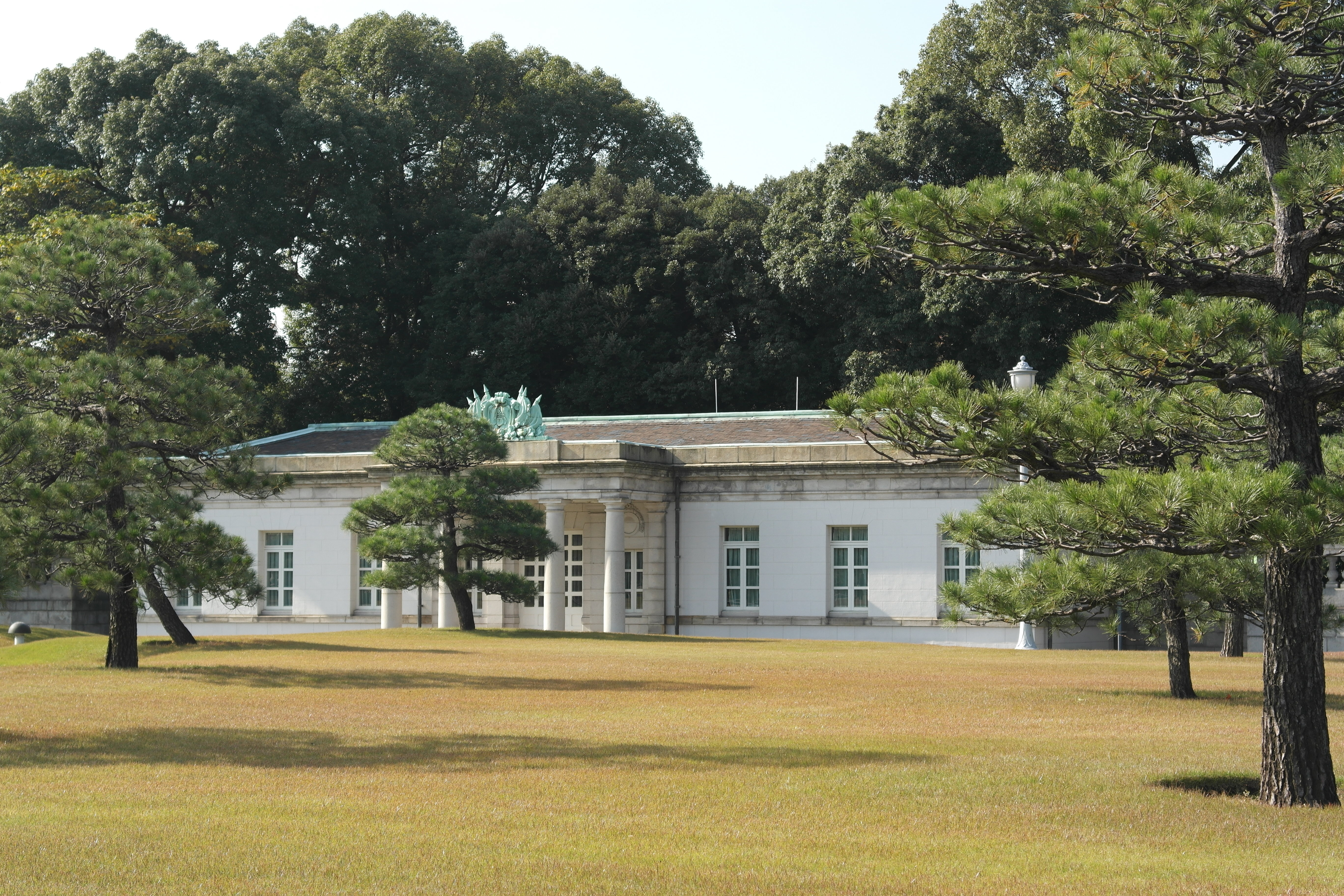
Safety facilities and national treasure accompanying Akasaka-yuen

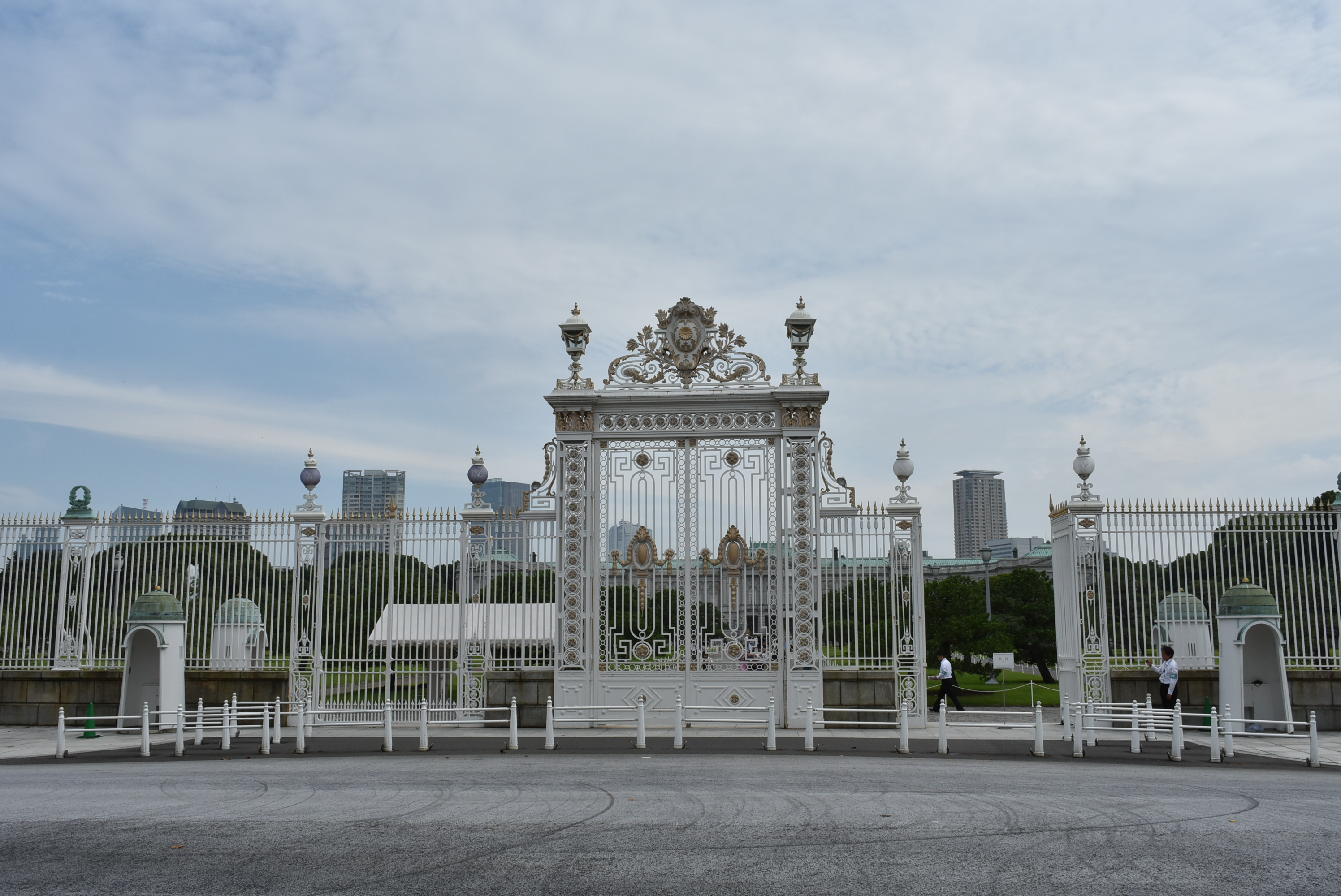
Gate

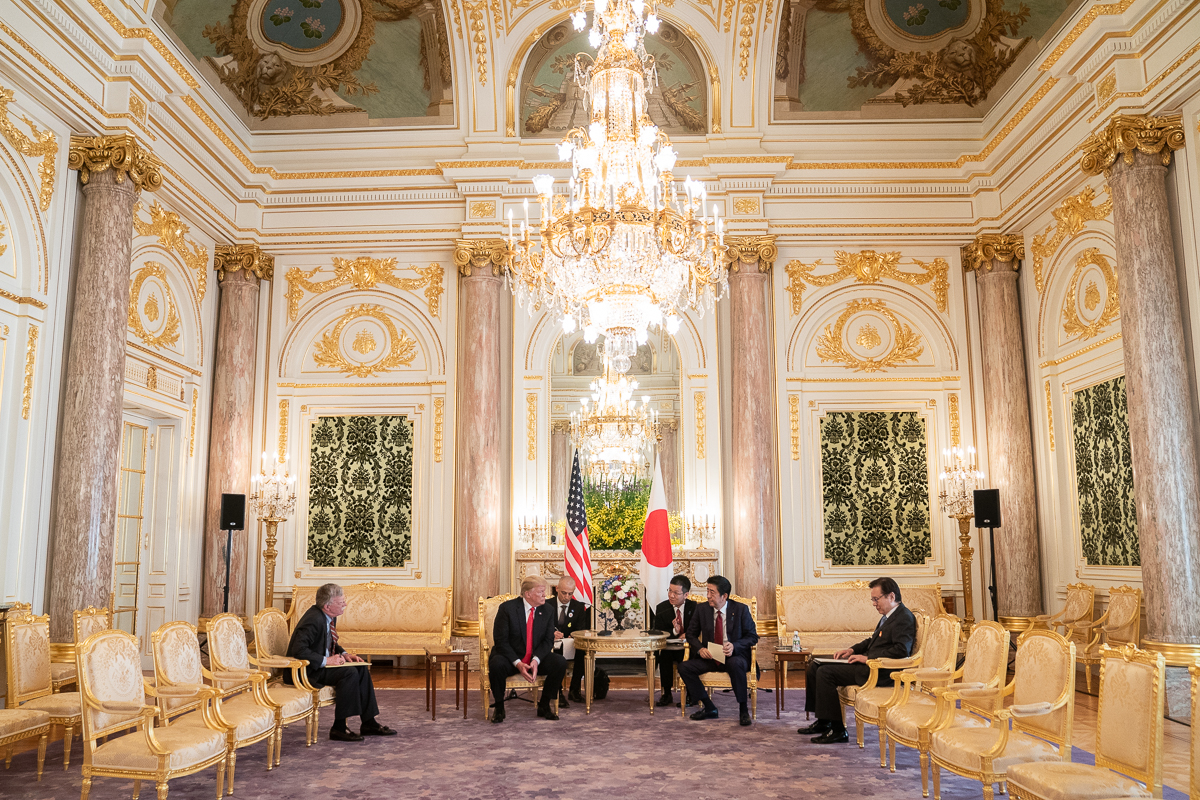
Japan's Prime Minister Abe Shinzo meeting U.S. President Donald J. Trump (May 27, 2019)

== See also ==
- Rokumeikan
- Imperial Hotel, Tokyo
- Palace Hotel, Tokyo
- Royal Palace of El Pardo, the state guest house of Spain.
- Blair House, the state guest house of the United States
- Hyderabad House, the state guest house of India
- Diaoyutai State Guesthouse, the state guest house of the People's Republic of China
- Grand Hotel (Taipei), the state guest house of the Republic of China
- Jamuna State Guest House, The State Guest House Of the Government of Bangladesh
