= Sentō Imperial Palace =

Any residence of a retired emperor of Japan

Coordinates: 35°1′23.89″N 135°45′47.85″E

In Japan, the Sentō Imperial Palace (仙洞御所, Sentō gosho; "Emeritus Imperial Palace") traditionally does not refer to a single location, but to any residence of retired emperors. Before Emperor Akihito abdicated in 2019, the last Emperor to retire did so in 1817 (Emperor Kōkaku), so the designation commonly refers to the Kyoto Sentō Imperial Palace (京都仙洞御所).

== Kyoto Sentō Imperial Palace ==
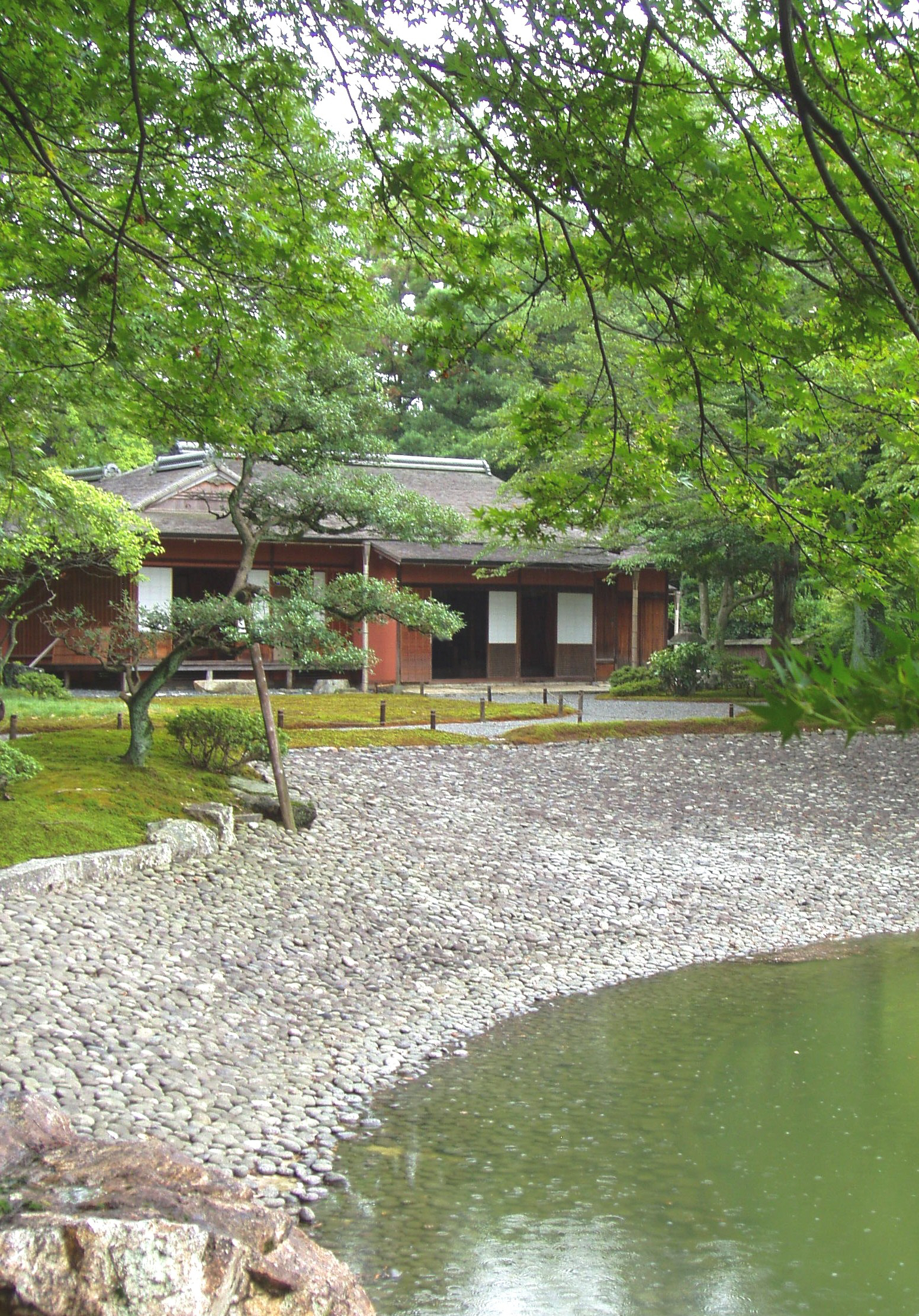
Seika-tei tea house with pond of Sentō Imperial Palace

The Kyoto Sentō Imperial Palace (京都仙洞御所, Kyōto Sentō-gosho) 22 acres (89,000 m^{2})) is a large garden in Kyoto, Japan, formerly the grounds of a palace for retired emperors. It is administered by the Imperial Household Agency and is opened to visitors.

=== History ===
Sento Imperial Palace was completed in 1630 for Emperor Go-Mizunoo's retirement, along with the corresponding Ōmiya Palace for the Empress Dowager Nyoin. Both palaces were repeatedly destroyed by fire and reconstructed until a blaze in 1854, after which the Sento palace was never rebuilt. (Ōmiya Palace was, however, reconstructed in 1867 and is still used by the emperor whenever he visits Kyoto). Today only two Sento structures, the Seika-tei and Yushin-tei teahouses, remain. The excellent gardens, laid out in 1630 by renowned artist Kobori Masakazu (Kobori Enshu), are now its main attractions.

=== Layout ===
The palace grounds are located within the southeast corner of the Kyoto Imperial Palace, and entered via a stately wooden gate within its surrounding earthen wall. A carriage house with graceful triple gables sits just within, but still outside the garden's unadorned inner wall, whose gate leads directly to a fine view opening westward across the garden pond.

The garden's primary feature is a large pond with islands and walkways, whose north and south segments were linked by a short canal in 1747. The north pond was extended and reworked from 1684 to 1688; the south pond is notable for its expansive "ocean shore" of rounded stones and cherry trees, an edging of mixed natural and hewn stones, and a separate, understated embankment of squared stones. The ponds contain a variety of highly picturesque islands and six bridges in a varied styles, including one with an impressive wisteria trellis (built 1895).

Two teahouses complete the garden: Seika-tei, single-roofed and spare, at the southern end of the south pond; and Yushin-tei, thatched and rustic with a notable round window, at the western side of the north pond.

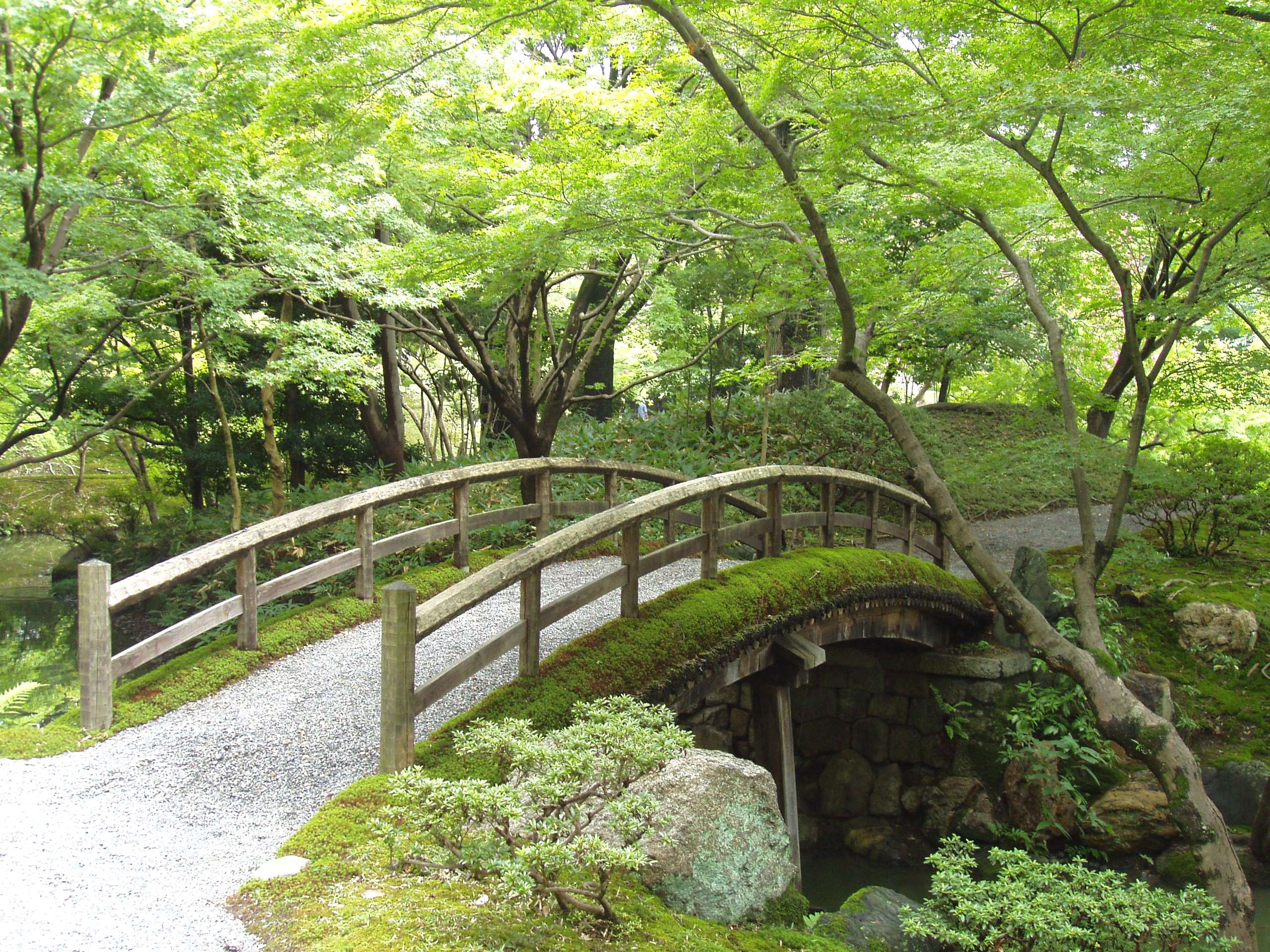
A bridge

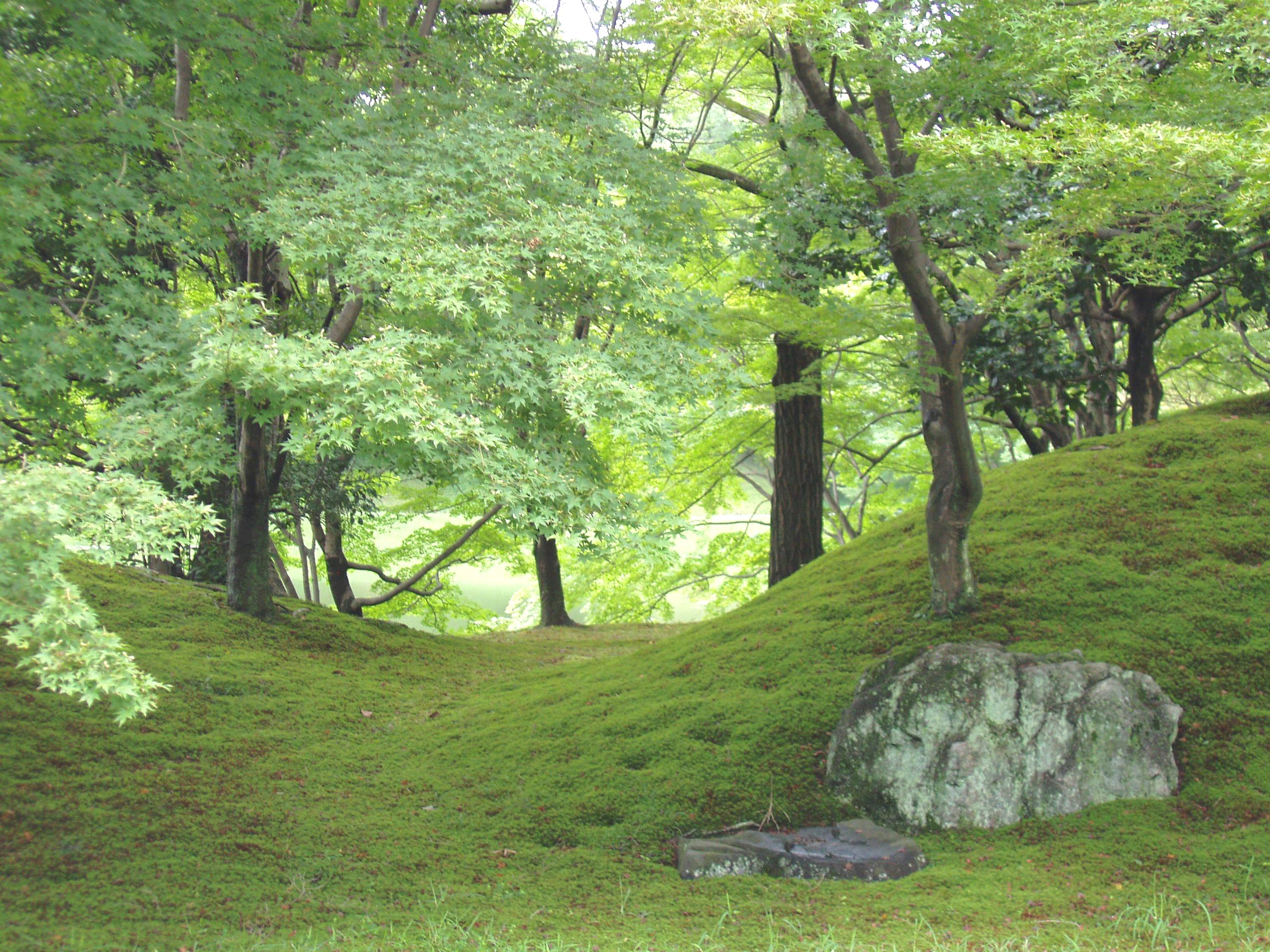
Mossy hills

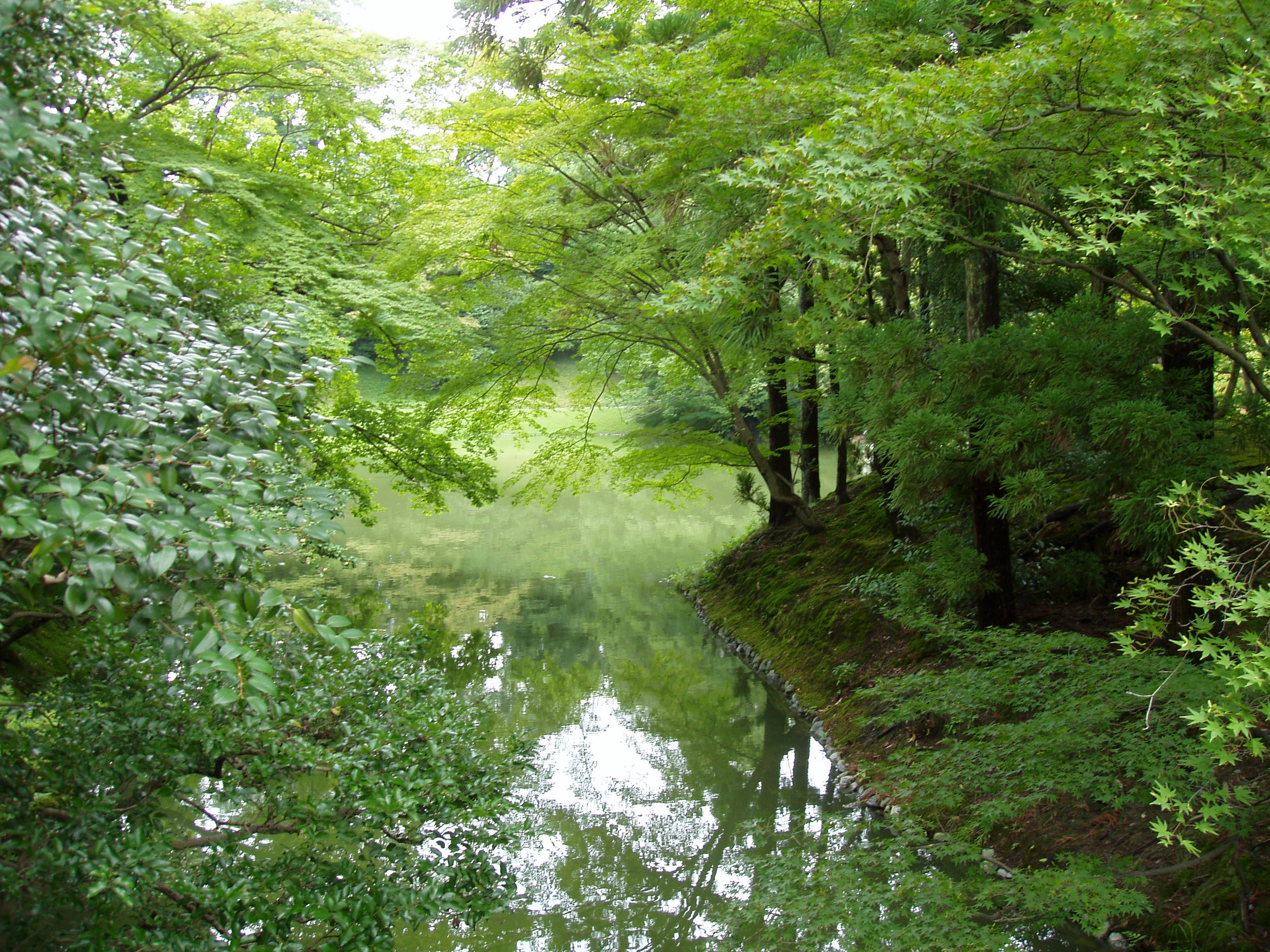
Pond through trees

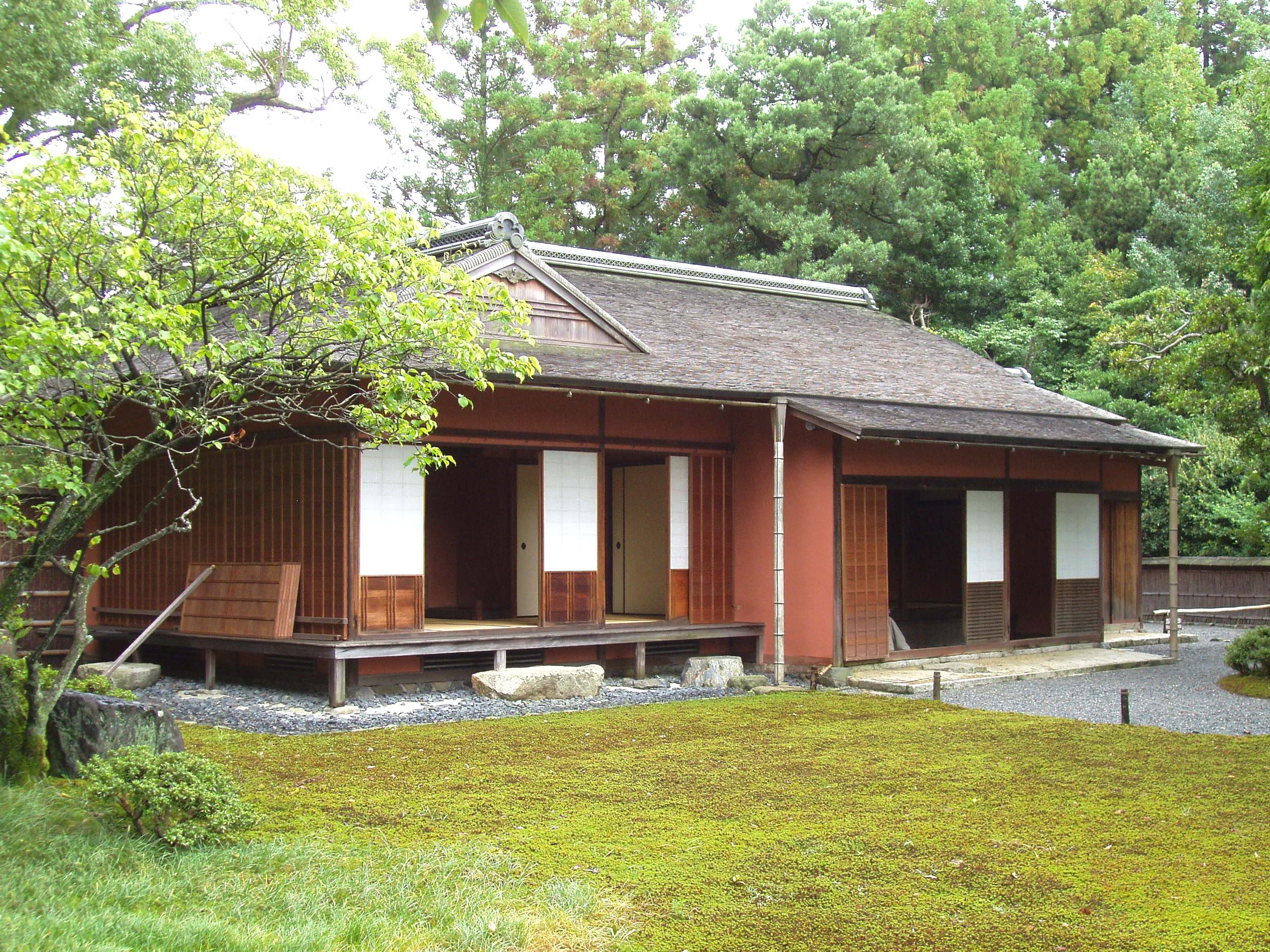
Seika-tei

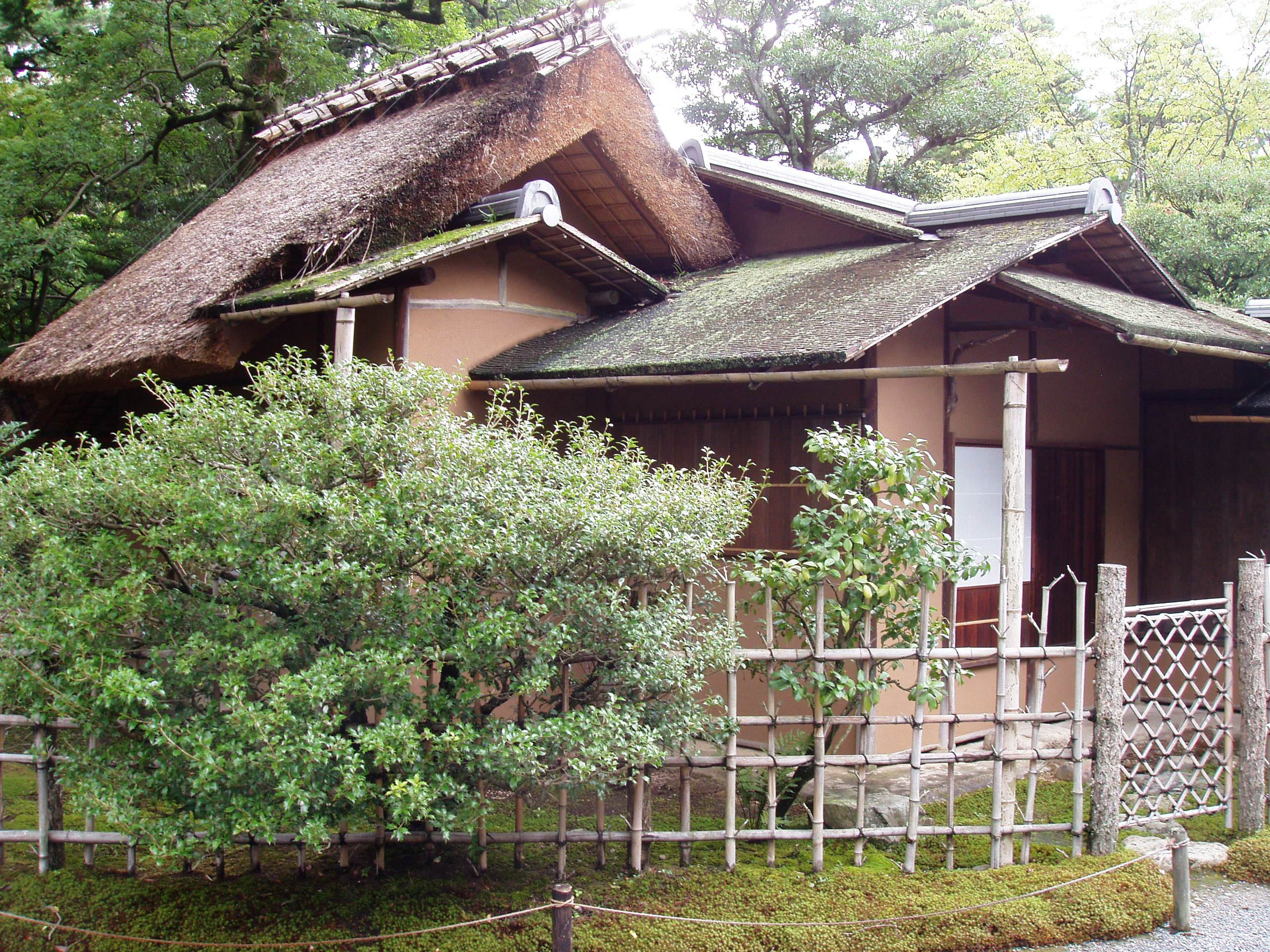
Yushin-tei

== Modern Sentō Imperial Palace ==
Akihito abdicated on 30 April 2019. Until he moved out of the Fukiage Palace located on the grounds of the Tokyo Imperial Palace on March 31, 2020, the Fukiage Palace was named Fukiage Sentō Imperial Palace (吹上仙洞御所, Fukiage Sento Gosho). Until the Akasaka Palace is refurbished to accommodate to his old age, he is living temporarily in the Takanawa Residence, which became the Temporary Sentō Imperial Palace (仙洞仮御所, Sento Kari Gosho).
