= Moto-Akasaka =

Town located in Minato-ku, Tokyo

Coordinates: 35°40′41″N 139°43′52″E

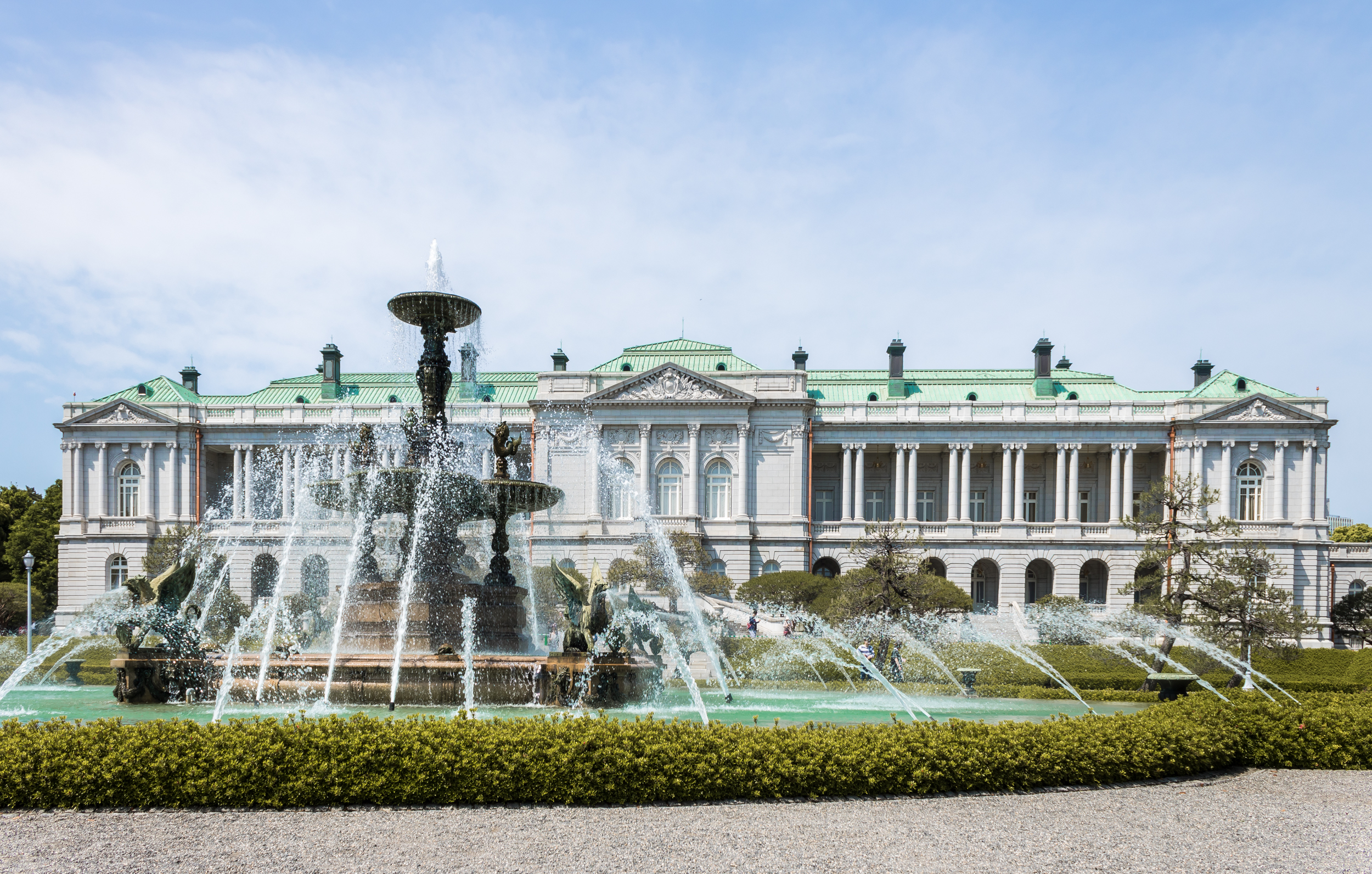
Akasaka Palace

Moto-Akasaka (元赤坂) is a district in Tokyo, and a part of the Minato ward.

== Education ==
Minato City Board of Education operates public elementary and junior high schools. Moto-Akasaka (1-2-chōme) is zoned to Akasaka Elementary School (赤坂小学校) and Akasaka Junior High School (赤坂中学校).
