= List of Japanese imperial residences =

This is a list of residences occupied by the Japanese Imperial Family, noting the seasons of the year they are traditionally occupied.

Members of the Japanese Imperial Family inhabit a range of residences around Japan. Some are official imperial palaces; others are used as private residences, although they are all owned and maintained by the state. Other imperial palaces are no longer residences (e.g. the Akasaka Palace). Some remain in irregular use for imperial occasions. Some of the Imperial Palaces and villas enjoy legal protection such as the Akasaka Palace which is a National Treasure or the Heijō Palace, which is a Special Historic Site and listed as part of the UNESCO World Heritage Site Historic Monuments of Ancient Nara.

The occupied imperial residences are cared for and maintained by the Imperial Household Agency. Former palaces or sites are under the administration of various ministries or local authorities.

== Current residences by residents ==
Residence	Location	Notes
=== Emperor Naruhito and Empress Masako ===
==== Official ====
Tokyo Imperial Palace	Tokyo	Official Tokyo residence; used also as the private residence. Houses the Three Palace Sanctuaries and the Fukiage Ōmiya Palace, the residence of the late Dowager Empress Kōjun. Certain parts such as the East Gardens and the Kitanomaru Park are open to the public. Only twice a year, for the emperor's birthday and New Year's day are the public allowed to enter the grounds up to the Kyuden, where the imperial family appears on the balcony. The enthronement ceremonies of the current Emperor took place at the Tokyo Imperial Palace in 2019.
Kyoto Imperial Palace	Kyoto	Technically still the "senior palace" of the monarch; the main building on the palace grounds includes, among other halls, the Shishinden (紫宸殿, Hall for State Ceremonies), Seiryōden (清涼殿, lit. 'cool, refreshing hall'), Kogosho (小御所, Court Room), Ogakumonsho (御学問所, Imperial Study or Library), and a number of residences for the Empress, high-ranking aristocrats and government officials. Enthronement ceremonies to the Chrysanthemum Throne last took place in Kyoto in 1928.
=== Fumihito, Crown Prince Akishino and Kiko, Crown Princess Akishino ===
==== Official ====
Akasaka Estate	Minato, Tokyo	Official Tokyo residence; located in the larger Akasaka Estate where a number of other members of the imperial family reside
=== Masahito, Prince Hitachi and Hanako, Princess Hitachi ===
==== Official ====
Higashi Residence	Shibuya, Tokyo	Official Tokyo residence since December 1976
=== Princess Tomohito of Mikasa ===
==== Official ====
Akasaka Estate	Minato, Tokyo	Official Tokyo residence since December 1982
=== Hisako, Princess Takamado ===
==== Official ====
Akasaka Estate	Minato, Tokyo	Official Tokyo residence since December 1986

== Current residences by type ==
Residence	Location	Member(s)
=== Official ===
Tokyo Imperial Palace	Tokyo	The Emperor and Empress
Akasaka Estate	Tokyo	The Crown Prince and Crown Princess Akishino, Princess Tomohito of Mikasa, Princess Takamado
Higashi Residence	Tokyo	Prince and Princess Hitachi
Sanbancho Residence	Tokyo	the late Prince Katsura, currently unused
Takanawa Residence	Tokyo	the late Princess Takamatsu, temporarily used by the Emperor Emeritus and Empress Emerita since 2020
=== Imperial estates ===
The Imperial Stock Farm (Goryo Bokujo)	Utsunomiya, Tochigi Prefecture	
Momijiyama Imperial Cocoonery	Tokyo Imperial Palace	Imperial sericulture farm, domain of The Empress, who is personally responsible for the running and ceremonial feeding and harvesting ceremonies for silk production. Part of the silk harvest is donated by her to the Shōsōin repository.
Saitama Imperial Wild Duck Preserve (Saitama Kamoba)	Koshigaya, Saitama Prefecture	
Shinhama Imperial Wild Duck Preserve (Shinhama Kamoba)	Ichikawa, Chiba Prefecture	
=== Privately used ===
Sentō Imperial Palace	Kyoto	all members
Katsura Imperial Villa	Kyoto	all members
Shugakuin Imperial Villa	Kyoto	all members
Nasu Imperial Villa	Nasu, Tochigi Prefecture	all members
Hayama Imperial Villa	Hayama, Kanagawa Prefecture	all members
Suzaki Imperial Villa	Shimoda, Shizuoka Prefecture	all members

=== Formerly privately used ===
Atami Imperial Villa	Atami, Shizuoka Prefecture	all members
Shizuoka Imperial Villa	Shizuoka, Shizuoka Prefecture	all members
Numazu Imperial Villa	Numazu, Shizuoka Prefecture	all members
Odawara Imperial Villa	Odawara, Kanagawa Prefecture	all members
Kamakura Imperial Villa	Kamakura, Kanagawa Prefecture	all members
Miyanoshita Imperial Villa	Hakone, Kanagawa Prefecture	all members
Tamozawa Imperial Villa	Nikkō, Tochigi Prefecture	all members

== Former residences by date ==
Residence	Location	Date(s)
Akasaka Palace	Minato, Tokyo	Official residence of the Crown Prince and his family (1909–1974), now the State Guesthouse (迎賓館, Geihinkan)
Nagoya Detached Palace or Nagoya Imperial Villa (Nagoya Castle)	Nagoya	Official residence in Nagoya after the end of the Tokugawa Shogunate, from 1893-1930
Heian Palace	Kyoto	Original imperial palace of Heian-kyō (794–1227), completely destroyed by fire and not rebuilt
Fukuhara Palace	Hyōgo-ku, Kobe	Imperial palace of Fukuhara-kyō (1180), abandoned, destroyed over time and not rebuilt
Saga Imperial Villa	Ukyō-ku, Kyoto	Imperial palace of Emperor Saga (814), turned into Daikaku-ji by his daughter Masako, became residence of several cloistered emperors
Nagaoka Palace	Mukō, Kyoto	Imperial palace of Nagaoka-kyō (784–794), abandoned, destroyed over time and not rebuilt
Heijō Palace	Nara	Imperial palace of Heijō-kyō (710–784), abandoned and destroyed over time. Partly reconstructed in the late 20th century, listed as a UNESCO World Heritage Site under "Historic Monuments of Ancient Nara" since 1998
Shigaraki Palace	Kōka, Shiga	Imperial palace of ? (745), abandoned and destroyed over time
Naniwa Palace	Osaka	Imperial palace of Naniwa-kyō (744–745), abandoned and destroyed over time
Kuni Palace	Kizugawa, Kyoto	Imperial palace of Kuni-kyō (740–744), abandoned and destroyed over time
Fujiwara Palace	Kashihara, Nara	Imperial palace of Fujiwara-kyō (694–710), abandoned and destroyed over time
Kiyomihara Palace	Asuka, Yamato	Last imperial palace in Asuka (672-694) before the court moved to Fujiwara-kyō
Okamoto Palace	Asuka	Imperial palace of Asuka (672)
Shima Palace	Asuka	Imperial palace of Asuka (672)
Ōmi Palace or Ōtsu Palace	Ōtsu, Shiga	Imperial Palace of Ōmi-kyō (667–672) before the court moved back to Asuka
Tachibana no Hironiwa Palace	Asakura, Fukuoka	Imperial Palace of Asakura (661–667) before the court moved to Ōmi-kyō
Later Okamoto Palace	Asuka	Imperial Palace of Asuka (656–661) before the court moved to Asakura
Kawara Palace	Asuka	Imperial Palace of Asuka (655–656)
Itabuki Palace	Asuka	Imperial Palace of Asuka (654–655)
Nagara-Toyosaki Palace	Naniwa-kyō	Imperial Palace of Naniwa-kyō (645–654) before the court moved back to Asuka
Itabuki Palace	Asuka	Imperial Palace of Asuka (643–645)
Kudara Palace	Kōryō, Nara	Imperial Palace of Koryo (640–642) before the court moved back to Asuka
Umayasaka Palace	Asuka	Imperial Palace of Asuka (640)
Tanaka Palace	Asuka	Imperial Palace of Asuka (636–640)
Okamoto Palace	Asuka	Imperial Palace of Asuka (630–636)
Oharida Palace	Asuka	Imperial Palace of Asuka (603–630)
Toyura Palace	Asuka	Imperial Palace of Asuka (592–603), later rededicated as nunnery Toyura-dera
Takatsu Palace	Osaka	Imperial Palace of Naniwa-kyō (4th century), founded by Emperor Nintoku. Other palaces also mentioned but not confirmed.
