= Aki no Arashi =

Japanese political organization

Anti-Imperial System National Individuals' Joint Struggle Committee Han Tennosei Zenkoku Kojin Kyōtō - Aki no Arashi 反天皇制全国個人共闘・秋の嵐
- Founded: 1987
- Headquarters: Tokyo, Japan
- Ideology: Anti-monarchism

Aki no Arashi (秋の嵐, meaning Autumn Storm) was a Japanese organization advocating the abolition of the Emperor system and the establishment of a republican form. The full name is 反天皇制全国個人共闘・秋の嵐 (Han Tennosei Zenkoku Kojin Kyōtō - Aki no Arashi) meaning Anti-Imperial System National Individuals' Joint Struggle Committee. The group was started in 1987 by a radical group of students at Waseda University in Tokyo and street punk rockers. They often used street performances to spread their message.

In 1996 members of Aki no Arashi won a lawsuit against the Tokyo Metropolitan Government for unlawful arrests and battery by Tokyo police. The events took place during a series of rallies organized by the group in 1989, after the death of Emperor Showa.

== See also ==
- Hantenren
- Anti-monarchism in Japan
