= Suzaki =

Suzaki (written: 須崎 or 洲崎) is a Japanese surname. Notable people with the surname include:

- Aya Suzaki (洲崎 綾, born 1986), a Japanese voice actress
- Miu Suzaki (須崎 海羽, born 1999), a Japanese pair skater and Olympian

== See also ==
- Suzaki Station, a train station in Nishinomiya, Hyōgo Prefecture, Japan
- Suzaki Imperial Villa, a residence in Shimoda, Shizuoka Prefecture, Japan owned by the Japanese imperial family
