= Republic of Japan =

Republic of Japan may refer to:

- Japan, incorrectly, as Japan is a constitutional monarchy
- Anti-monarchism in Japan
- Republic of Ezo
