= Suzaki Imperial Villa =

Japanese Imperial Family residence

Coordinates: 34.668106°N 138.978188°E

”Tenno Beach” near the Suzaki Imperial Villa

Suzaki Imperial Villa (須崎御用邸, Suzaki Goyōtei), located in the Suzaki neighborhood of Shimoda city, Shizuoka Prefecture, Japan is a residence owned by the Japanese Imperial Family, and used on infrequent intervals as an informal summer retreat.

== History ==
The Imperial Family of Japan previously had residences in several locations within Shizuoka Prefecture:

- Atami Imperial Villa (熱海御用邸, Atami Goyōtei), located in the city of Atami was built in 1888 by Emperor Meiji. The modern-day Atami city hall is located on its former site.
- Shizuoka Imperial Villa (静岡御用邸, Shizuoka Goyōtei), located in Aoi-ku, Shizuoka was built by Emperor Meiji in 1900 and turned over to the Shizuoka city government in 1930. It was destroyed in the bombing of Shizuoka in World War II.
- Numazu Imperial Villa (沼津御用邸, Numazu Goyōtei), located in Numazu was built by Emperor Meiji in 1893, and was a favorite residence of his son, Crown Prince Yoshihito, the future Emperor Taishō. It was partially burned down during the bombing of Numazu in World War II. It was turned over to the Numazu city government in 1969 and has been open as a public park since 1970.

The Suzaki Imperial Villa was acquired by the Imperial Household Agency after the Numazu Imperial Villa was given to the city of Numazu. It is located on the west bank of Sagami Bay at the southern tip of Izu Peninsula near where the waters of the bay mix with the Kuroshio Current offshore. The Villa was the location of a marine biology laboratory managed by Emperor Shōwa, who used to visit it for some ten days in spring, summer and winter, and complemented the similar laboratory he operated at the Hayama Imperial Villa on the opposite side of the bay. Research from the laboratory has resulted in a number of technical monographs.

The villa building itself is a one-story building of western architectural design and dates to 1971.

The adjacent private beach is informally known as Tenno Beach, or Emperor Beach. The bay is not deep, providing safety for the Emperor's family. The beach is surrounded by beautiful rock formations, which further limits public access.
