= Hantenren =

Japanese political organization

Anti-Emperor Activities Network 反天皇制運動連絡会 Han Tennosei Undo Renraku Kai
- Founded: 1984
- Headquarters: Tokyo, Japan
- Ideology: Anti-monarchism

Website
- http://www.ten-no.net/ (dead link)

Han Tennosei Undo Renraku Kai (反天皇制運動連絡会; roughly Anti-Emperor Activities Network, Anti-Emperor Association or Liaison Group Movement against the Imperial System) shortened to Hantenren (反天連) is a Japanese group opposed to the Emperor of Japan, the flag of Japan, Kimigayo, and the Yasukuni Shrine.

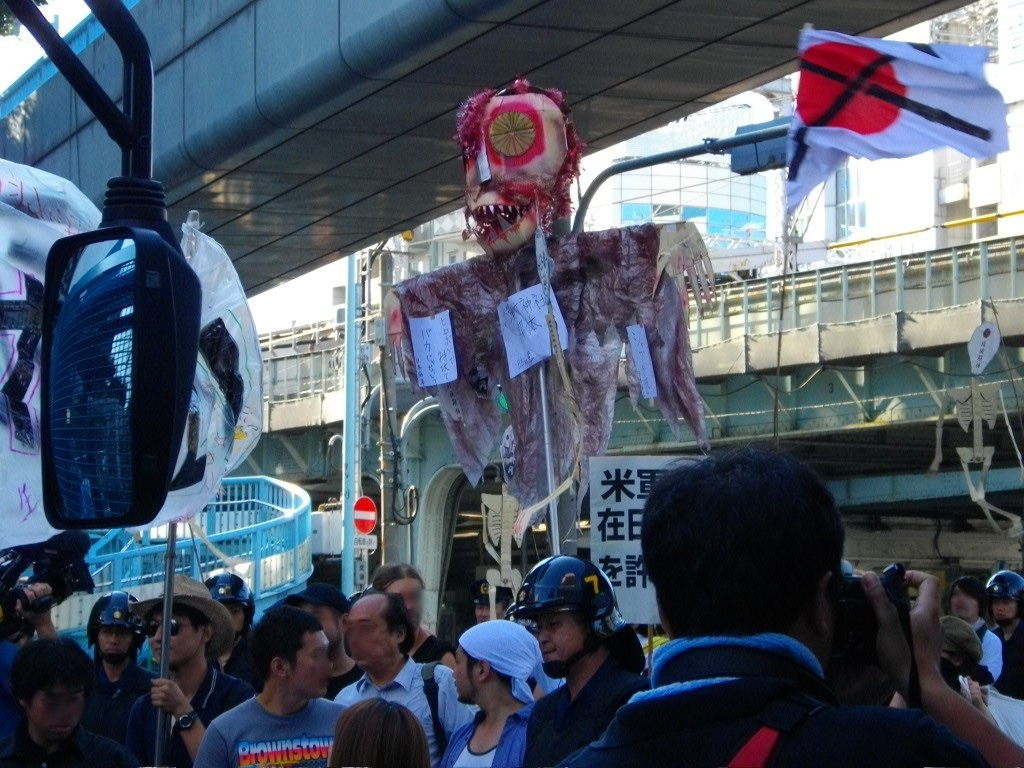
August 15, 2009

== History ==
After the birth of Princess Aiko, the first born of the Crown Prince and Princess in December 2001, 60 Hantenren members conducted a protest against nationwide celebrations of the birth. One member Homare Kitano, 42, is quoted saying “Today, many other children were born, but this baby will be praised as if she is the most blessed child”. Other protesters chanted slogans such as “We won’t celebrate” and “No need for successor to Imperial family,” while wearing sashes with an “X” written over the kanji for celebration.

During the 2019 Japanese imperial transition, Hantenren supporters protested the ascension of Naruhito.

== See also ==
- Aki no Arashi
