= Emperor of Japan =

Title of the ruling monarch of Japan since 660 BC

- 天皇
- Imperial
- Imperial standard

Incumbent
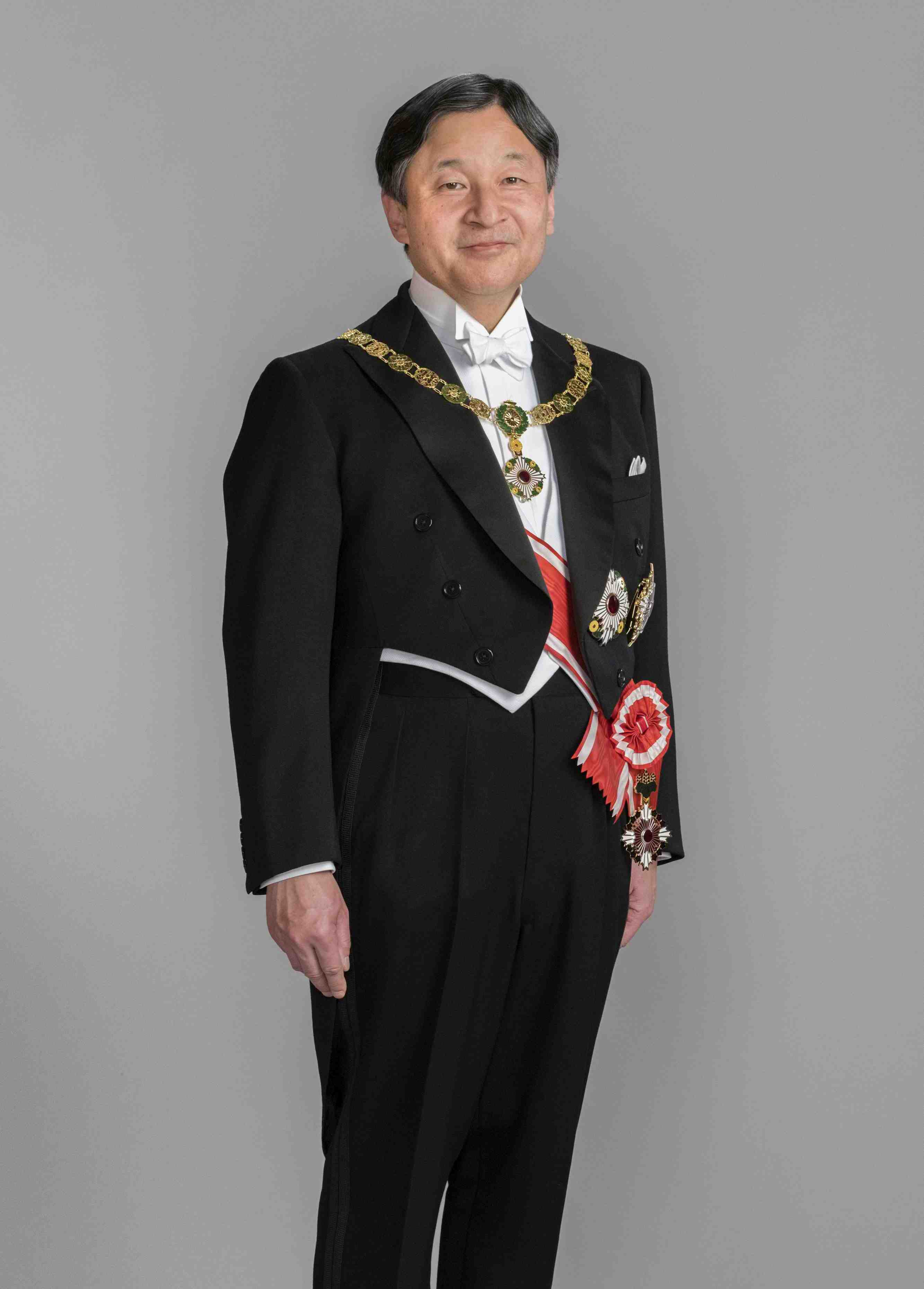
- Naruhito since May 1, 2019

Details
- Style: His Majesty (Note: 陛下 (Heika)) (Note: The emperor does not generally use the style "Imperial Majesty" because in modern Japanese protocol, the preferred title for the emperor is simply "Majesty". This style reflects a cultural understanding of the emperor's unique position as a symbolic figurehead within the country, not necessarily requiring the distinction of "Imperial" to denote his status above foreign monarchs. Instead, the Japanese term "Tennō Heika" (天皇陛下) is used, which roughly translates into English as "His Majesty the Emperor". This style of address is prescribed by law and used by the Imperial Household Agency.)
- Heir presumptive: Fumihito
- First monarch: Jimmu (traditional); Yūryaku (historical); Tenmu (use of title) (Note: First monarch contemporaneously documented as using the title "Tennō".)
- Formed: February 11, 660 BC; 2685 years ago (traditional) (Note: This way of counting years is based on the ancient Japanese way, and does not necessarily match the current one. The actual date of the foundation of the Yamato House is not known; the first historical writings did not appear until the 8th century.) c. 4th century- 1st century AD (historical)
- Residences: Tokyo Imperial Palace (official residence) and Kyoto Imperial Palace
- Website: www.kunaicho.go.jp

The Emperor of Japan (Note: Japanese: 天皇, romanized: Tennō; pronounced [tennoꜜː]; literally "ruler from heaven" or "heavenly sovereign") (Note: In English, the use of the term Mikado (帝/御門; IPA: [mʲika̠do̞]) for the emperor was once common but is now considered obsolete.) is the hereditary monarch and head of state of Japan. The emperor is defined by the Constitution of Japan as the symbol of the Japanese state and the unity of the Japanese people, his position deriving from "the will of the people with whom resides sovereign power". The Imperial Household Law governs the line of imperial succession. Pursuant to his constitutional role as a national symbol, and in accordance with rulings by the Supreme Court of Japan, the emperor is personally immune from prosecution. By virtue of his position as the head of the Imperial House, the emperor is also recognized as the head of the Shinto religion, which holds him to be the direct descendant of the sun goddess Amaterasu. According to tradition, the office of emperor was created in the 7th century BC, but the first historically verifiable emperors appear around the 3rd or 4th centuries AD.

The role of the emperor of Japan has historically alternated between a largely ceremonial symbolic role and that of an actual imperial ruler. Since the establishment of the first shogunate in 1192, the emperors of Japan have rarely taken on a role as supreme battlefield commander, unlike many Western monarchs. Japanese emperors have nearly always been controlled by external political forces, to varying degrees. Between 1192 and 1867, the shōguns, or their shikken regents in Kamakura (1203–1333), were the de facto rulers of Japan, although they were nominally appointed by the emperor. After the Meiji Restoration in 1868, the emperor was the embodiment of all sovereign power in the realm, as enshrined in the Meiji Constitution of 1889; however, except for a period of parliamentary monarchy from approximately 1905 to 1932, the degree to which the Emperor exercised real power between the Restoration and the Surrender of Japan at the end of World War II is widely debated. Since the enactment of the 1947 constitution, the emperor has been relegated to an entirely ceremonial and representative role, without even nominal political powers. The emperor is the head of the Japanese honors system, conferring orders, decorations, medals, and awards in the name of the state and on behalf of its people in accordance with the advice of the Cabinet.

Since the mid-nineteenth century, the emperor and other members of the imperial family have resided at the Imperial Palace, (Note: initially Kyūjō (宮城), later Kōkyo (皇居)) located on the former site of Edo Castle in the heart of Tokyo, the current capital of Japan. Earlier, emperors resided in Kyoto, the ancient capital, for nearly eleven centuries. The Emperor's Birthday (currently February 23) is a national holiday.

The emperor since May 1, 2019 is Naruhito, who ascended the Chrysanthemum Throne on the abdication of his father, Akihito. He is the only remaining monarch and head of state in the world who holds the title of emperor.

== Constitutional role ==
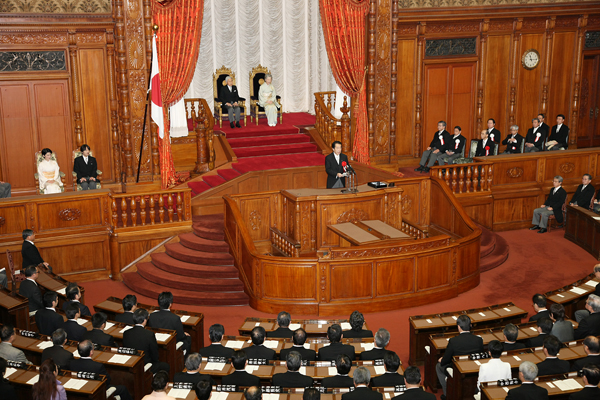
Emperor Akihito and Empress Michiko seated in the Chamber of the House of Councillors of the National Diet, with members of the Imperial Family, the Cabinet, and Prime Minister Naoto Kan giving the government's speech in front of the assembled members of parliament (2010).

Most constitutional monarchies formally vest executive power in the reigning monarch in their capacity as head of state. In turn, these constitutional monarchs are bound by either convention or statute to exercise their prerogatives on the advice of ministers responsible to the duly elected parliament. Some monarchies codify this principle further by requiring royal acts to be countersigned by a minister in order to take effect, thus passing political and legal accountability from the reigning monarch to the minister tendering advice. (Note: Sovereign states operating as constitutional monarchies which impose countersignature requirements on their monarchs are Belgium, Denmark, Jordan, Luxembourg, the Netherlands, Norway, Spain, and Thailand.) By contrast, Japan is one of only two such sovereign states where the monarch is not even the nominal chief executive; the other is Sweden. Rather, Article 65 of the Constitution of Japan explicitly vests executive authority in the Cabinet, of which the prime minister is the leader. The emperor is not the commander-in-chief of the Japan Self-Defense Forces either. Instead, the Japan Self-Defense Forces Act of 1954 explicitly vests supreme command and control in the prime minister. Nevertheless, the emperor remains Japan's internationally recognized head of state.

The emperor's fundamental role within the machinery of the Japanese constitution is to perform important representational functions as "…the symbol of the State and of the unity of the People, deriving his position from the will of the people with whom resides sovereign power." He is limited to performing "acts in matters of state" as delineated by the Constitution, without even nominal powers related to government. Moreover, said acts are only exercised in accordance with the binding advice and consent of the Cabinet, which is collectively responsible to the Diet and thence to the electorate. Nevertheless, the emperor enjoys the following rights in the conduct of state business: (a) the right to be consulted before acting on ministerial advice; (b) the right to encourage a given policy or course of administrative action; and (c) the right to warn the Cabinet against the same. In these respects, the emperor personifies the democratic state, sanctions legitimate authority, ensures the legality of his official acts, and guarantees the execution of the public will. These functions, when considered altogether, serve two purposes: foremost, to uphold the continuity and stability of Japanese democracy; and second, to foster a shared national identity and cultural heritage that transcends party politics. In order to maintain his institutional neutrality as Japan's national symbol, he is barred from making political statements.

It is the emperor's preeminent constitutional duty to appoint the prime minister as designated by the Diet and the chief justice as designated by the Cabinet. However, the emperor does not have the authority to decline the nominations. The emperor's other responsibilities, laid down in Article 7 of the Constitution, concern the basic functioning of the state. To this end, the emperor, on behalf of the Japanese people:

1. Promulgates constitutional amendments, laws, cabinet orders, and treaties.
2. Convokes sessions of the Diet.
3. Dissolves the House of Representatives.
4. Proclaims general elections for members of the Diet.
5. Attests to the appointment and dismissal of ministers of state and other officials as provided for by law, and of full powers and credentials of ambassadors and ministers.
6. Attests to general and special amnesty, commutation of punishment, reprieve, and restoration of rights.
7. Awards state honors.
8. Attests to instruments of ratification and other diplomatic documents as provided for by law.
9. Receives the credentials of foreign diplomats.
10. Performs ceremonial functions.

Regular ceremonies of the emperor with a constitutional basis are the Imperial Investitures (Shinninshiki) in the Tokyo Imperial Palace and the Speech from the Throne ceremony in the House of Councillors in the National Diet Building. The latter ceremony opens ordinary and extra sessions of the Diet. Ordinary sessions are opened each January and also after new elections to the House of Representatives. Extra sessions usually convene in the autumn and are opened then.

== Cultural role ==
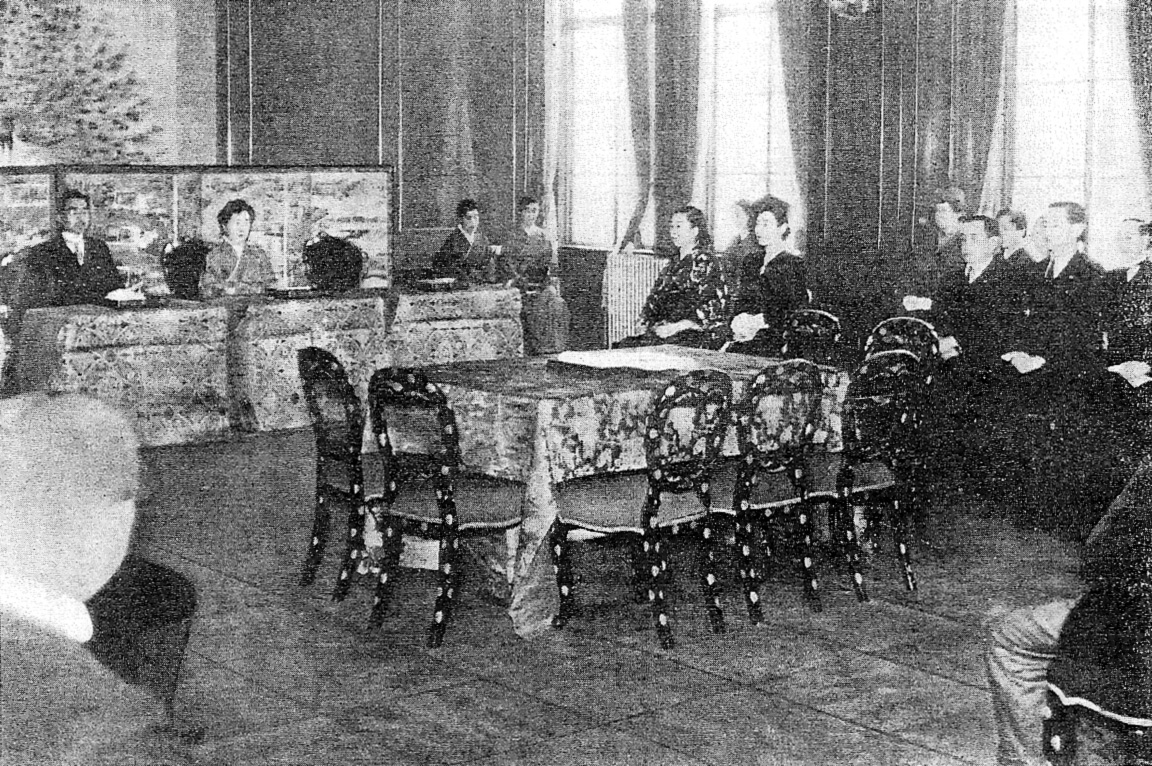
Utakai Hajime poetry competition, chaired by Emperor Shōwa and Empress Kōjun (1950)

The Tennō is regarded as the foremost Shintō priest in terms of religion. This sacred duty dates back to the Niiname-sai (新嘗祭, "tasting of new rice") imperial harvest festival. In this ritual, the emperor presents newly gathered rice to the gods. The celebration is known as Daijōsai (大嘗祭, "Great Tasting") and takes place in the first year after the emperor's accession to the throne. The historical text Nihonshoki, written in the year 720, has the first mention of this ceremony, whose beginnings are believed to date back even further. The event evolved through time to become the Day of Thanksgiving for Labour, a recognized official holiday today.

The office of the emperor is also cultural bearer and steward of tradition and culture. For example, the Utakai Hajime is the annual poetry reading competition convened by the emperor. The emperor is supported in this function by the empress and other members of the imperial family, who have honorary patronages of many associations and organisations. They travel extensively throughout the year within the country to uphold these roles.

In sports, the Emperor's Cup (天皇賜杯, Tennō shihai) is given to a number of competitions such as football, judo, volleyball, and the top division yūshō winner of a sumo tournament.

== History ==
The title of "Emperor" (天皇, Tennō) is attested since the 7th century, alongside the word "Japan" (日本, Nihon). Around the same time, the Japanese also adopted the Chinese title of "Son of Heaven" (天子, tenshi; or 天子様 tenshi-sama). The title of "emperor" was borrowed from China, being derived from Chinese characters, and was retroactively applied to the legendary Japanese rulers who reigned before the 7th–8th centuries AD.

Although the emperor has been a symbol of continuity with the past, the degree of power exercised by the emperor has varied considerably throughout Japanese history.

=== Origins ===
According to the traditional account of the 8th-century Nihon Shoki, Japan was founded by Emperor Jimmu in 660 BC, 2686 years ago. Most modern scholars agree in regarding Jimmu and at least the nine first emperors as mythical. Most scholars agree that the third century AD is a more likely starting point for an imperial line in Japan.

Most scholars are of the view that Emperor Sujin is the first verifiable emperor. The Nihon shoki lists him as the 10th emperor and places his death around 30 AD, while Kojiki places it around 258 AD; although 318 AD is more likely. The first ruler to appear in contemporary sources is Yūryaku (r. 456–479), the 21st emperor, who is attested in the Inariyama and Eta Funayama Swords, dated to either 471 or 534 AD. As one argument, the reign of Kinmei (c. 509–571 AD), the 29th emperor, is the first for whom contemporary historiography is able to assign verifiable dates.

According to Scott Morton, the ancestors to the imperial Yamato clan was a warlike clan that started in Kyushu then left the island around the first century AD. Morton states they probably left in order to find better land for agriculture and made their way gradually along the coast of the Inland Sea. According to Morton, the imperial clan may have been established as rulers in the Yamato region by third or fourth centuries.

According to Chinese sources, the unification of Japan took place between the 2nd and 3rd centuries and was carried out by the rulers of Yamatai, which likely correspond to the Japanese kingdom of Yamato.

Archaeological information about the earliest historical rulers of Japan may be contained in the ancient tombs known as kofun, constructed between the early 3rd century and the early 7th century AD. However, since the Meiji period, the Imperial Household Agency has refused to open the kofun to the public or to archaeologists, citing their desire not to disturb the spirits of the past emperors. Kofun period artefacts were also increasingly crucial in Japan as the Meiji government used them to reinforce their authority. In 2016, the Imperial Household Agency reversed its position and decided to allow researchers to enter some of the kofun with limits on time and methods.

=== Disputes and instability (10th century) ===
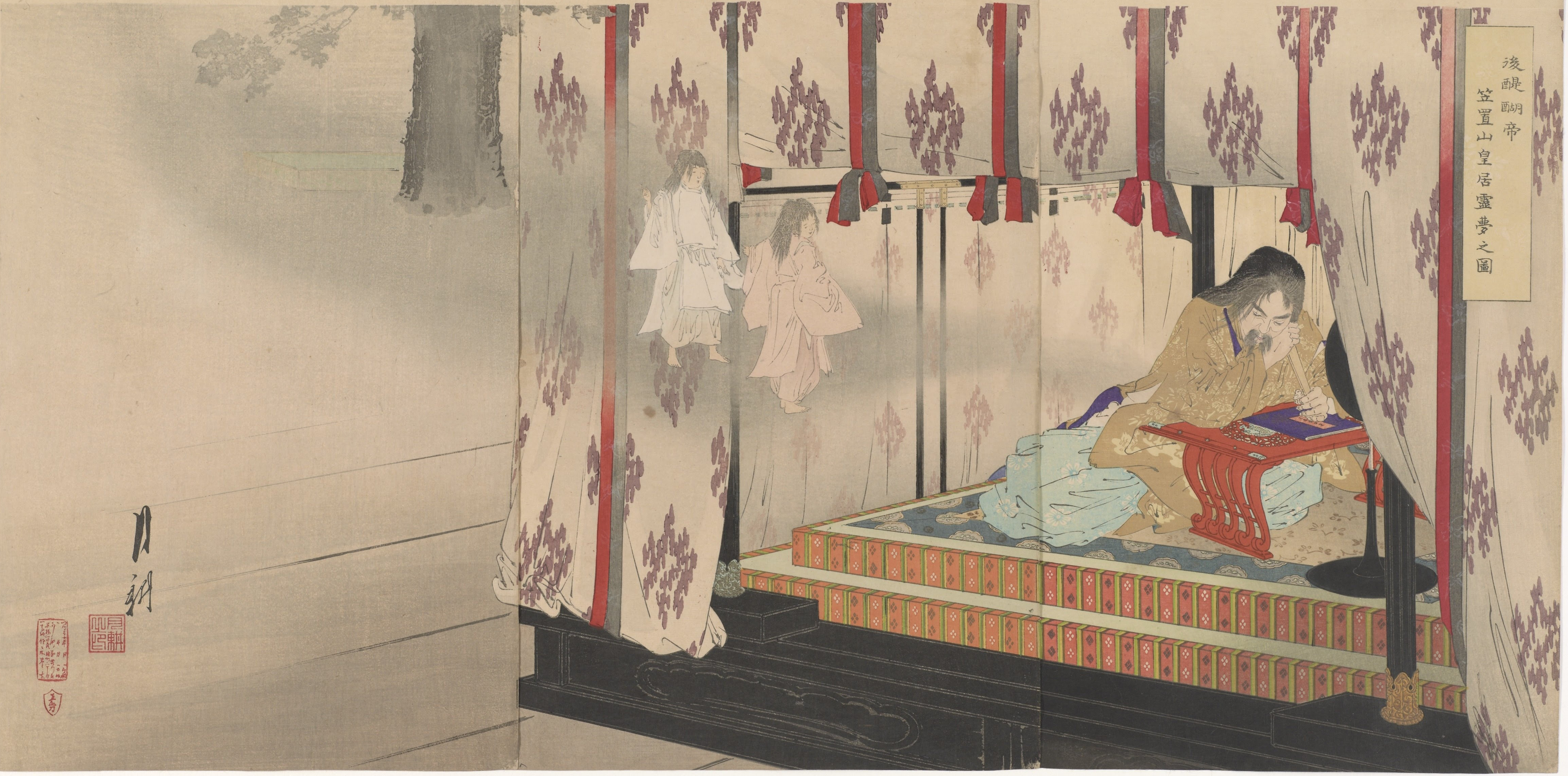
Emperor Go-Daigo

The growth of the samurai class from the 10th century gradually weakened the power of the imperial family over the realm, leading to a time of instability. Emperors are known to have come into conflict with the reigning shogun from time to time. Some instances, such as Emperor Go-Toba's 1221 rebellion against the Kamakura shogunate and the 1336 Kenmu Restoration under Emperor Go-Daigo, show the power struggle between the Imperial Court in Kyoto and the military governments of Japan.

=== Factional control (530s–1867) and shōguns (1192–1867) ===
There have been seven non-imperial families who have controlled Japanese emperors: the Soga (530s–645), the Fujiwara (850s–1070), the Taira (1159–1180s), the Minamoto (1192–1199/1203), the Hōjō (1199/1203–1333), the Ashikaga (1336–1565), and the Tokugawa (1603–1867). However, every shogun from the Minamoto, Ashikaga, and Tokugawa families had to be officially recognized by the emperors, who were still the source of sovereignty, although they could not exercise their powers independently from the shogunate.

During the major part of 1192 to 1867, political sovereignty of the state was exercised by the shōguns or their shikken regents (1203–1333), whose authority was conferred by Imperial warrant. When Portuguese explorers first came into contact with the Japanese (see Nanban period), they described Japanese conditions in analogy, likening the emperor with great symbolic authority, but little political power, to the pope, and the shōgun to secular European rulers (e.g., the Holy Roman emperor). In keeping with the analogy, they even used the term "emperor" in reference to the shōguns and their regents, e.g. in the case of Toyotomi Hideyoshi, whom missionaries called "Emperor Taico-sama" (from Taikō and the honorific sama). A Dutch embassy report used similar terminology in 1691. Empress Go-Sakuramachi was the last ruling empress of Japan and reigned from 1762 to 1771. During the Sakoku period of 1639 to 1853, there was very limited trade between Japan and foreigners. The Dutch were the only westerners who had limited access to Japan.

=== Kenmu Restoration (1333–1336) ===
Emperor Go-Daigo succeeded in 1333 to get back the direct authority directly to the emperor after overthrowing the Kamakura shogunate, with the help of Ashikaga Takauji, a defected Kamakura general. The short three-year period during which the power was directly in the hand of the emperor is called the Kenmu Restoration. The direct ruling of the emperor proved however inefficient and ultimately failed, with Takauji grabbing political power for himself.

=== Meiji Restoration (1868) ===
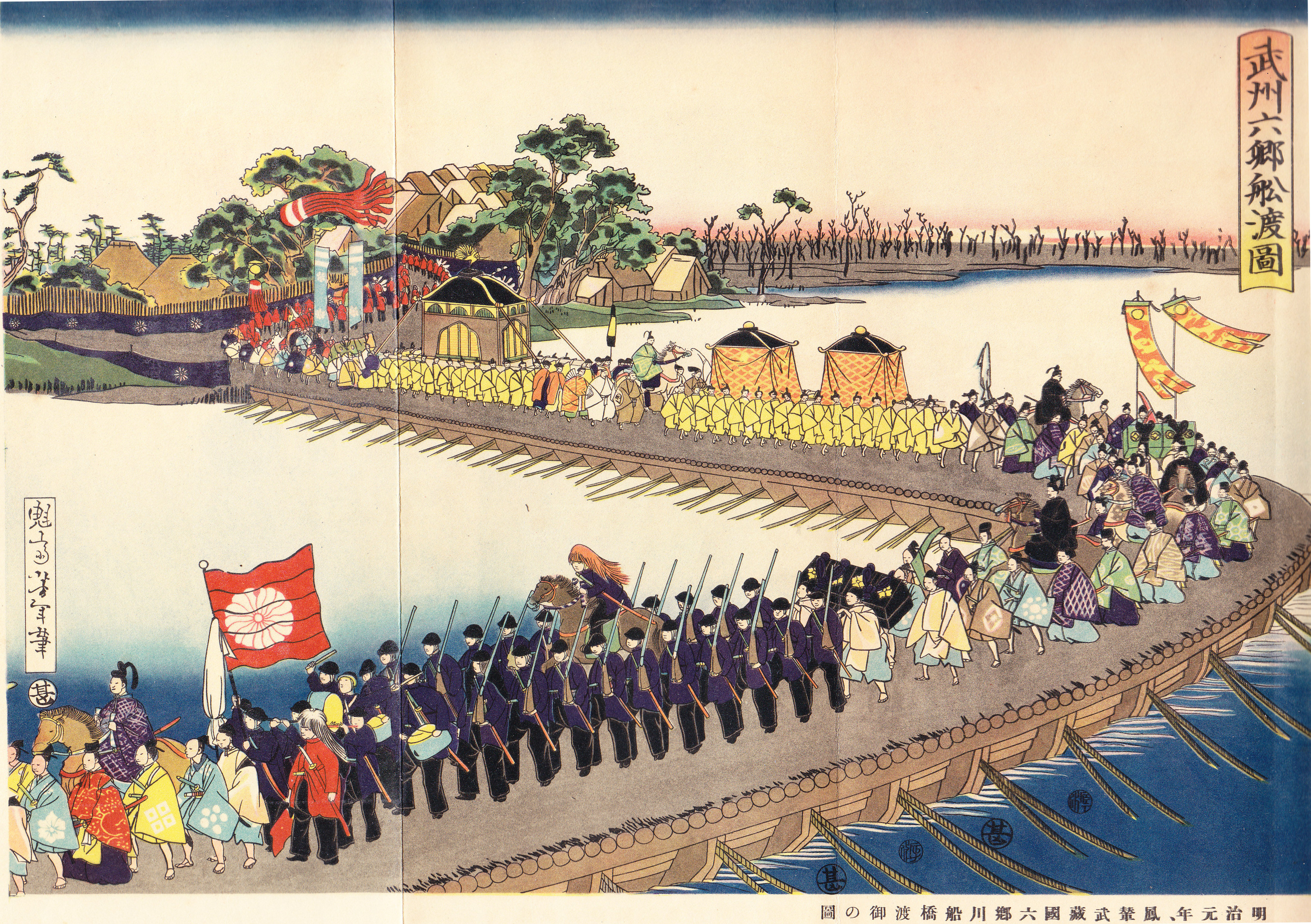
The first arrival of Emperor Meiji to Edo (1868)

In July 1853, Commodore Perry's Black Ships of the US Navy made their first visit to Edo Bay. Japan lacked the military and industrial power to prevent it. Unequal treaties coerced and took advantage of Japan. Consequently, Japan was forcibly opened to foreign trade and the shogunate proved incapable of hindering the "barbarian" interlopers; Emperor Kōmei thus began to assert himself politically. By the early 1860s, the relationship between the Imperial Court and the shogunate was changing radically. Disaffected domains and rōnin began to rally to the call of sonnō jōi ("revere the emperor, expel the barbarians"). The domains of Satsuma and Chōshū, historic enemies of the Tokugawa, used this turmoil to unite their forces and won an important military victory outside of Kyoto against Tokugawa forces.

On November 9, 1867, the Shogun Tokugawa Yoshinobu formally stepped down to restore Emperor Meiji to nominal full power. He issued the imperial decree of constitutionalism on April 14, 1875. The Meiji Constitution was adopted on February 11, 1889. The emperor of Japan became an active ruler with considerable political power over foreign policy and diplomacy which was shared with an elected Imperial Diet. The Japanese subjects gained many rights and duties.

The constitution described the emperor (in Article 4) as: "the head of the Empire, combining in Himself the rights of sovereignty", and he "exercises them, according to the provisions of the present Constitution". His rights included to sanction and promulgate laws, to execute them and to exercise "supreme command of the Army and the Navy". The liaison conference created in 1893 also made the emperor the leader of the Imperial General Headquarters. On Meiji's death in 1912 and the accession of his son Taishō, who suffered from ill-health and various disabilities, many of these powers were assumed by the Imperial Diet in an era known as the Taishō Democracy.

=== World War II (1937–1945) ===
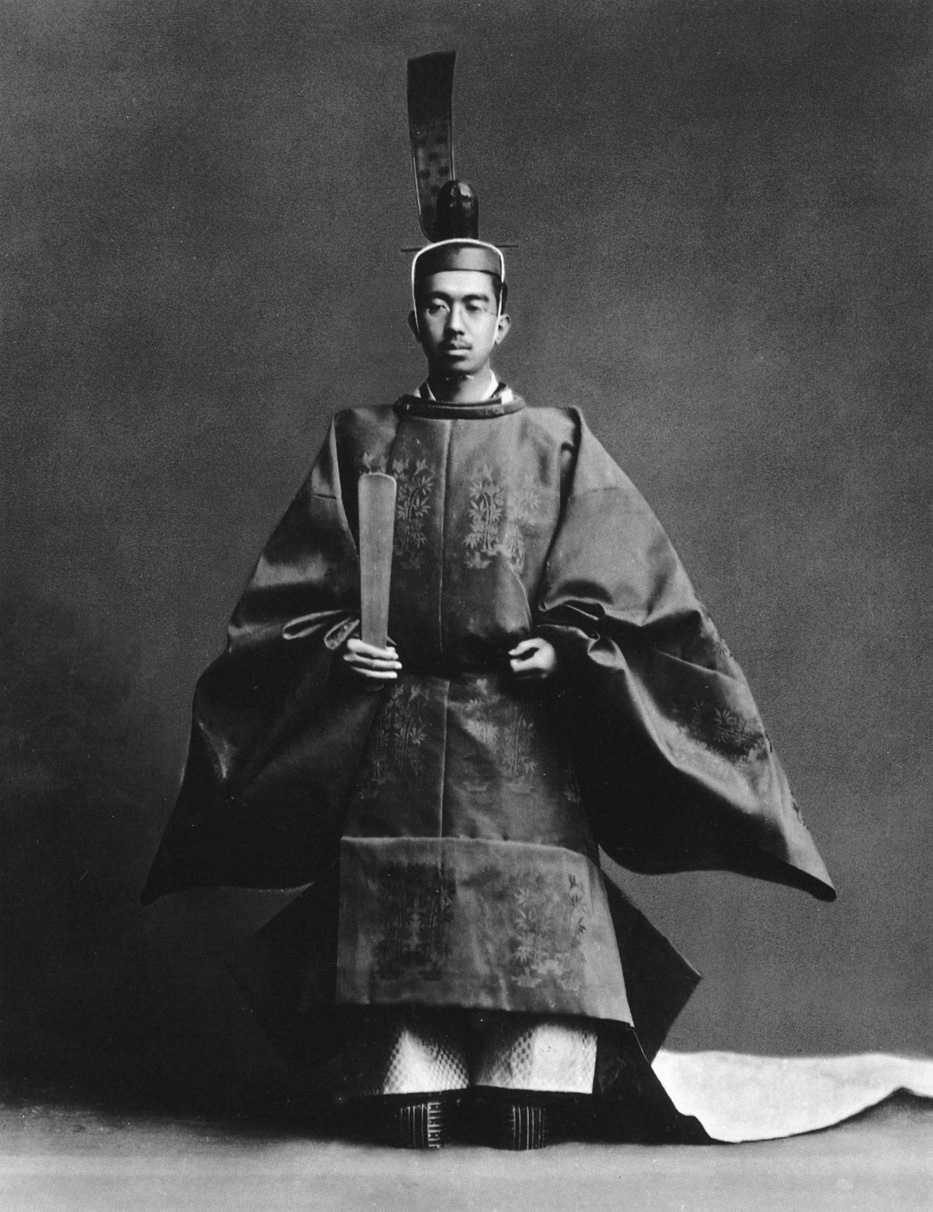
Emperor Shōwa reigned from 1926 to 1989

Emperor Shōwa (Hirohito) was in power during the Pacific War; he was the de jure sovereign of the state and the grand marshal of the imperial forces. However, the extent of his de facto role and powers have been heavily debated since the war's end. The role of the emperor as head of the State Shinto religion was exploited during the war, creating an Imperial cult that led to kamikaze bombers and other manifestations of fanaticism. This in turn led to the requirement in the Potsdam Declaration for the elimination "for all time of the authority and influence of those who have deceived and misled the people of Japan into embarking on world conquest".

In State Shinto, the emperor was believed to be an arahitogami (現人神) (manifest kami or incarnation of a deity). Following Japan's surrender, the Allies issued the Shinto Directive separating church and state within Japan. In 1946, Emperor Shōwa was forced to proclaim the Humanity Declaration, but the declaration excludes the word arahitogami (現人神), including the unusual word akitsumikami (現御神; living god) instead. As such, some experts doubt whether his divinity was renounced. Jean Herbert said it would be inadmissible to deny his divine origin as according to the Japanese tradition, the figure of the emperor would be "the extension in time" of the goddess Amaterasu and the previous emperors, representing a privileged moment in eternity. Although akitsumikami is often translated as "divine" or "divinity", some Western scholars (including John W. Dower and Herbert P. Bix) have pointed out that its real meaning is "manifest kami" (or, more generally, "incarnation of a god"), and that therefore the emperor would still be, according to the declaration, an arahitogami ("living god"), although not an akitsumikami ("manifest kami").

Emperor Shōwa was excluded from the postwar Tokyo War Crimes Tribunal. Scholars dispute the power he had and the role he played during WWII. Emperor Shōwa's reign from 1926 until his death in 1989 makes him the longest-lived and longest-reigning historical Japanese emperor, and one of the longest-reigning monarchs in the world.

=== Contemporary (1978–present) ===
The Emperors of Japan have not visited Yasukuni Shrine since 1978. Hirohito maintained an official boycott of Yasukuni Shrine after it was revealed to him that Class-A war criminals had secretly been enshrined. The boycott was continued by his son and grandson, Akihito and Naruhito.

By 1979, Emperor Shōwa was the only monarch in the world with the monarchical title "emperor." Emperor Shōwa was the longest-reigning historical monarch in Japan's history and the world's longest reigning contemporary monarch until he was surpassed by King Bhumibol Adulyadej of Thailand in July 2008.

According to journalist Makoto Inoue of The Nikkei, Emperor Emeritus Akihito wanted to be closer to the people, rather than be treated like a god or robot. Inoue believes that during his reign, he transformed the symbolic role of emperor into a human being. In March 2019, the Mainichi reported 87% thought Akihito fulfilled his role as symbol of the state.

On April 30, 2019, Emperor Akihito abdicated due to health issues and the Heisei era ended. The previous time abdication occurred was Emperor Kōkaku in 1817. Akihito's eldest son, Naruhito ascended on May 1, 2019, referred to as Kinjō Tennō and Reiwa era started.

==== Current constitution ====
In 1947 the post-war Constitution of Japan (日本国憲法, Nihonkoku-Kenpō) became law when it received the emperor's assent on November 3, 1946. It provides for a parliamentary system of government and guarantees certain fundamental rights. Under its terms, the emperor of Japan is "the symbol of the State and of the unity of the people" and exercises a purely ceremonial role without the possession of sovereignty. It was drawn up under the Allied occupation that followed World War II and changed Japan's previous Prussian-style Meiji Constitution that granted the emperor theoretically unlimited powers. The liberal constitution was inspired by several European states. Currently, it is a rigid document and the oldest unamended constitution.

=== Realm and territories ===
Map of the Empire of Japan in 1942

Current realm of Japan

Historically, territorial designations are not a requirement for the position of Tennō (emperor). Rather it is the emperor's symbolic and religious power of authority. Since the Kamakura shogunate, the emperor held de jure ownership of the realm. Throughout most of medieval Japan, the shogun's legitimate authority was based on being appointed and receiving the power from the emperor even though the shogun was the de facto ruler. The emperor was considered a direct descendant of Amaterasu and of utmost importance in the Shinto religion and sentimental traditions. Thus no shogun tried to usurp the emperor, instead they tried to keep the emperor under control and away from politics. However, the emperor still had the power to "control time" via the Japanese Nengō which names eras on calendars after emperors.

During the Kofun period the first central government of the unified state was Yamato in the Kinai region of central Japan. The territory of Japan has changed throughout history. Its largest extent was the Empire of Japan. In 1938 it was 1,984,000 km^{2} (800,000 sq mi).

The maximum extent including the home islands and the Japanese colonial empire was 8,510,000 km^{2} (3,300,000 sq mi) in 1942. After its defeat in World War II the empire was dismantled. The contemporary territories include the Japanese archipelago and these areas. Regardless of territorial changes the emperor remains the formal head of state of Japan. During most of history, de facto power was with shoguns or prime ministers. The emperor was more like a revered embodiment of divine harmony than the head of an actual governing administration. In Japan, it was more effective for ambitious daimyo (feudal lords) to hold actual power, as such positions were not inherently contradictory to the emperor's position. The shoguns and prime ministers derived their legitimacy from the emperor. The parliamentary government continues a similar coexistence with the emperor.

The first recorded instance of the name Nihon 日本 was between 665 and 703 during the Asuka period. This was several centuries after the start of the current imperial line. The various names of Japan do not affect the status of the emperor as head of state.

=== Education ===
The emperors traditionally had an education officer. In recent times, Emperor Taishō had Count Nogi Maresuke, Emperor Shōwa had Marshal-Admiral Marquis Tōgō Heihachirō, and Emperor Akihito had Elizabeth Gray Vining as well as Shinzō Koizumi as their tutors. Members of the imperial family were obliged to be educated at the Gakushūin (Peer's School) by the 1926 Act of Education for the Imperial family, which was abolished in 1947.

== Reference and naming ==
The Japanese language has two words equivalent to the English word "emperor": tennō (天皇; "heavenly sovereign"), which refers exclusively to the emperor of Japan, and kōtei (皇帝), which primarily identifies non-Japanese emperors. Sumeramikoto ("the imperial person") was also used in Old Japanese.

The title given posthumously to an emperor changed after the death of Emperor Murakami in 967, who was the last to receive the title tennō. From the death of Emperor En'yū in 991 onward, the title in (院) started to be used instead of tennō as the honorary title attached to the posthumous name (諡号, shigō). The term in originally referred to both the residence and the honorific title of a retired emperor (太上天皇, Daijō Tennō). However, from the Heian period onward, as it became rare for emperors to die before abdicating, the in title became established as a posthumous title. An exception is Emperor Antoku, who died during his reign in 1187, and was posthumously given a title that included tennō. Although tennō was not used for emperors from the 10th or 12th century to the 19th century, it continued to be used for emperors who died before Juntoku abdicated due to the 1221 Jōkyū Rebellion.

Historically, emperors would refer to themselves as chin (朕) (a first-person singular pronoun used solely by the emperor, first originating from Chinese emperor Qin Shi Huang), which functioned as the royal we, however this has fallen out of use since 1945, in favour of the more common watakushi (私).

During their reign, the term tennō was only written in documents on limited occasions, such as when it was written as tennō but read as sumeramikoto in the imperial rescript of accession (即位宣命, sokui senmyō). Normally, out of respect, euphemistic expressions like kinri (禁裏), kinchū (禁中), or shujō (主上), which refer to the emperor's palace or supreme status, were used instead.

However, as the use of the title in, which originally referred to retired emperors, gradually expanded over time to include members of the imperial family, shoguns, daimyos, and even commoners, it came to be seen as inappropriate for deceased emperors. The Edo period Confucian scholar Nakai Chikuzan (1730–1804) remarked, "The title in is used by everyone from feudal lords and nobles to samurai and commoners, so it lacks the supreme honor of the imperial title and is unworthy" (from Sōbō Kigen). He argued that deceased emperors should be referred to as "Era Name + Tennō."

Amid this trend, when Emperor Kōkaku died in 1840, Emperor Ninkō consulted with the court nobles about reviving the title tennō and obtained permission from the Tokugawa shogunate. He then selected a posthumous name, and in 1841, bestowed the title and posthumous name Emperor Kōkaku (光格天皇, Kōkaku Tennō). From this point onward, the title tennō was once again used for deceased emperors.

Other titles that were recorded to be in use were kō (皇), tei (帝), ō (王), all meaning "prince" or "emperor", and tenshi (天子), or "son of heaven".

In English, the term mikado (御門 or 帝), literally meaning "the honorable gate" (i.e. the gate of the imperial palace, which indicates the person who lives in and possesses the palace; compare Sublime Porte, an old term for the Ottoman government), was once used (as in The Mikado, a 19th-century operetta), but this term is now obsolete.

Japanese emperors take on a regnal name, which is the common and polite way to refer to the emperor as a person during their reign. Japanese regnal names are more precisely names for a period of time that begins with a historical event, such as the enthronement of an emperor. Since Emperor Meiji, it has been customary to have one era per emperor and to rename each emperor after his death using the name of the era over which he presided. Before Emperor Meiji, the names of the eras were changed more frequently, and the posthumous names of the emperors were chosen differently.

Emperor Akihito giving a New Year's address to the people in 2010

The current emperor on the throne is typically referred to as Tennō Heika (天皇陛下, "His [Imperial] Majesty the Emperor"), Kinjō Heika (今上陛下, "His Current Majesty") or simply Tennō, when speaking Japanese. Emperor Akihito received the title Daijō Tennō (太上天皇, Emperor Emeritus), often shortened to Jōkō (上皇), upon his abdication on April 30, 2019, and is expected to be renamed Heisei Tennō (平成天皇) after his death and will then be referred to exclusively by that name in Japanese.

=== Origin of the title ===
Originally, the ruler of Japan was known as either 大和大王/大君 (Yamato-ōkimi, "Grand King of Yamato"), 倭王/倭国王 (Wa-ō/Wakoku-ō, "King of Wa", used externally) or 治天下大王 (Ame-no-shita shiroshimesu ōkimi or Sumera no mikoto, "Grand King who rules all under heaven", used internally) in Japanese and Chinese sources before the 7th century. The oldest diplomatic reference to the title 天子 (Tenshi, Emperor or Son of Heaven) can be found in a diplomatic document sent from Empress Suiko to the Sui dynasty of China in 607. In this document, Empress Suiko introduced herself to Emperor Yang of Sui as 日出處天子 (Hi izurutokoro no tenshi) meaning "Heavenly son of the land where the sun rises". The oldest documented use of the title 天皇 (Tennō, heavenly emperor) appears on a wooden tablet, or mokkan, that was unearthed in Asuka-mura, Nara Prefecture in 1998 and dated back to the reign of Emperor Tenmu and Empress Jitō in the 7th century.

== Marriage traditions ==
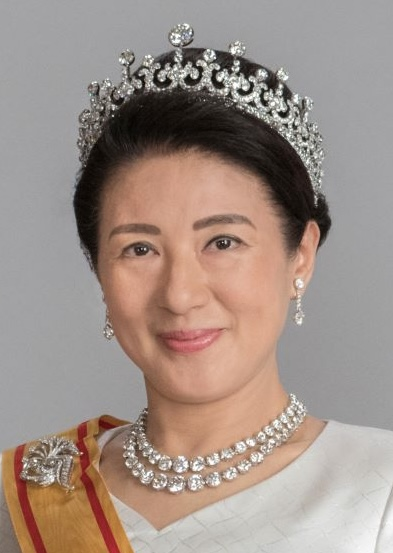
Masako, empress consort of Japan since 2019

Throughout history, Japanese emperors and noblemen appointed a spouse to the position of chief wife, rather than just keeping a harem or an assortment of female attendants.

The Japanese imperial dynasty consistently practiced official polygamy until the Taishō period (1912–1926). Besides his empress, the emperor could take, and nearly always took, several secondary consorts ("concubines") of various hierarchical degrees. Concubines were allowed also to other dynasts (Shinnōke, Ōke). After a decree by Emperor Ichijō (r. 986–1011), some emperors even had two empresses simultaneously (identified by the separate titles kōgō and chūgū). With the help of all this polygamy, the imperial clan could produce more offspring. (Sons by secondary consorts were usually recognized as imperial princes, too, and such a son could be recognized as heir to the throne if the empress did not give birth to an heir.)

Of the eight reigning empresses of Japan, none married or gave birth after ascending the throne. Some of them, being widows, had produced children before their reigns. In the succession, children of the empress were preferred over sons of secondary consorts. Thus it was significant which quarters had preferential opportunities in providing chief wives to imperial princes, i.e. supplying future empresses.

Apparently, the oldest tradition of official marriages within the imperial dynasty involved marriages between dynasty members, even between half-siblings or between uncle and niece. Such marriages were deemed to preserve better the imperial blood; or they aimed at producing children symbolic of a reconciliation between two branches of the imperial dynasty. Several imperial figures of the 5th and 6th centuries such as Prince Shōtoku (574–622) were children of half-sibling couples. Daughters of other families remained concubines until Emperor Shōmu (701–706)—in what was specifically reported as the first elevation of its kind—elevated his Fujiwara consort Empress Kōmyō to chief wife.

Japanese monarchs often sealed alliances with powerful chiefs through marriage. A repeated pattern saw an imperial son-in-law under the influence of his powerful non-imperial father-in-law. In the 6th century, the main family outside the Imperial clan that marriages were contracted with was the Soga lords. Beginning from the 7th and 8th centuries, emperors primarily took women of the Fujiwara clan as their highest-ranking wives – the most probable mothers of future monarchs. This was cloaked as a tradition of marriage between heirs of two kami (Shinto deities): descendants of Amaterasu with descendants of the family kami of the Fujiwara. (Originally, the Fujiwara descended from relatively minor nobility, thus their kami is an unremarkable one in the Japanese myth world.) To produce imperial children, heirs of the nation, with two-side descent from the two kami, was regarded as desirable – or at least it suited powerful Fujiwara lords, who thus received preference in the imperial marriage-market. The reality behind such marriages was an alliance between an imperial prince and a Fujiwara lord (his father-in-law or grandfather), the latter with his resources supporting the prince to the throne and most often controlling the government. These arrangements established the tradition of regents (Sesshō and Kampaku), with these positions held only by a Fujiwara sekke lord.

Fujiwara women often became empresses, while concubines came from less exalted noble families. In the last thousand years, sons of an imperial male and a Fujiwara woman have been preferred in the succession. The five Fujiwara families, Ichijō, Kujō, Nijō, Konoe, and Takatsukasa, functioned as the primary source of imperial brides from the 8th century to the 19th century, even more often than daughters of the imperial clan itself. Fujiwara daughters were thus the usual empresses and mothers of emperors. The Meiji-era Imperial House Law of 1889 made this restriction on brides for the emperor and crown prince explicit. A clause stipulated that daughters of Sekke (the five main branches of the higher Fujiwara) and daughters of the imperial clan itself were primarily acceptable brides. The law was repealed in the aftermath of World War II. In 1959 the future Emperor Akihito became the first crown-prince for over a thousand years to marry a consort from outside the previously eligible circle.

== Three Sacred Treasures ==
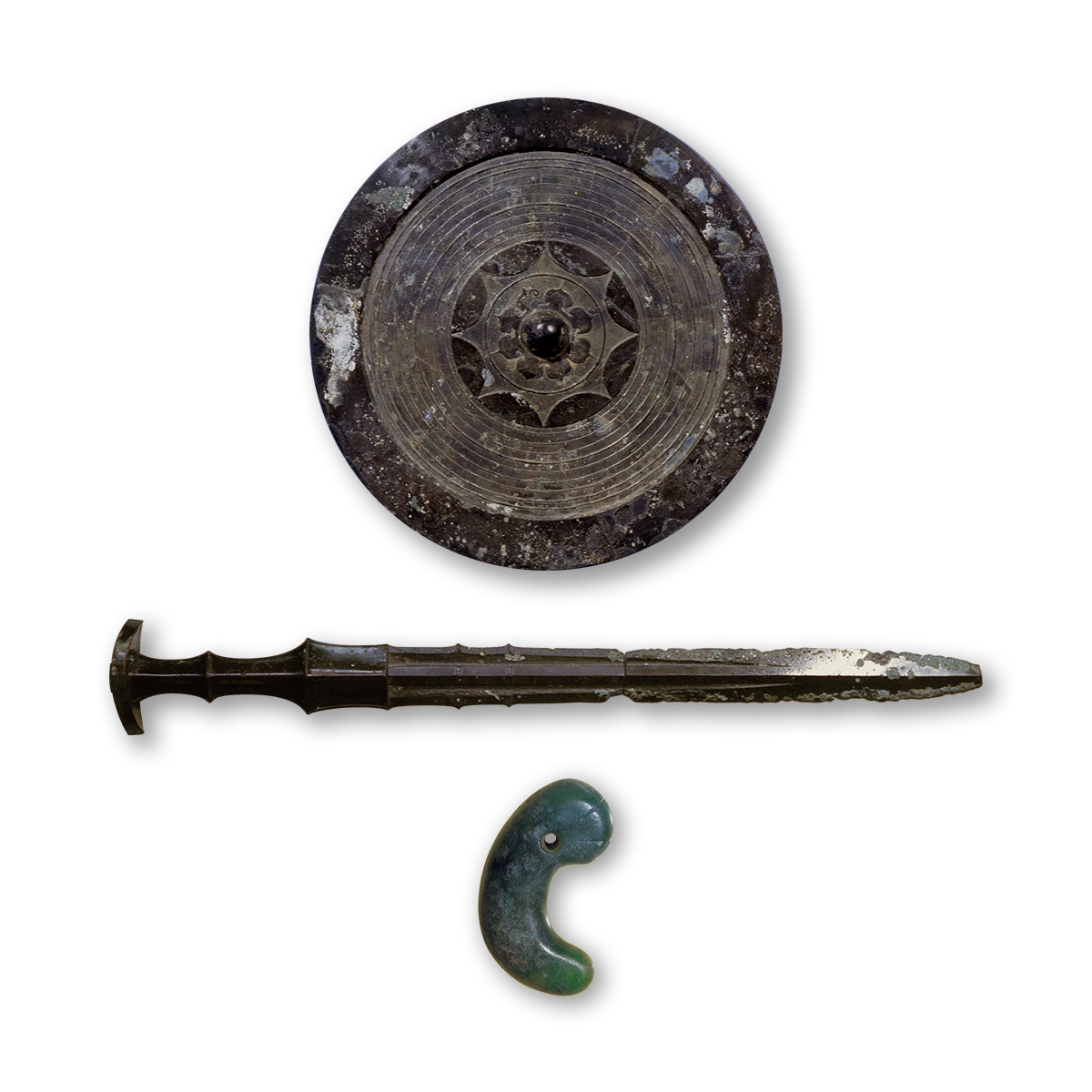
Conjectural images of the Imperial Regalia of Japan

In Japanese mythology, the sacred treasures were bestowed on Ninigi-no-Mikoto, the grandson of the goddess Amaterasu, at the advent of Tenson kōrin. Amaterasu sent him to pacify Japan by bringing the three celestial gifts that are used by the emperor. The account of Ninigi being sent to earth appears in the Nihon Shoki. The Three Sacred Treasures were inherited by successive Japanese emperors, which are the same as or similar to the sacred treasures in mythology. These three gifts signify that the emperor is the descendant of Amaterasu. The three sacred treasures are:

- Yata no Kagami (kept at the Ise Grand Shrine, with a replica at the central shrine of the Three Palace Sanctuaries)
- Yasakani no Magatama (kept at the central shrine of the Three Palace Sanctuaries)
- Kusanagi sword (kept at the Atsuta Shrine)

During the succession rite (senso, 践祚), possessing the jewel Yasakani no Magatama, the sword Kusanagi and the mirror Yata no Kagami are a testament of the legitimate serving emperor.

== Succession ==
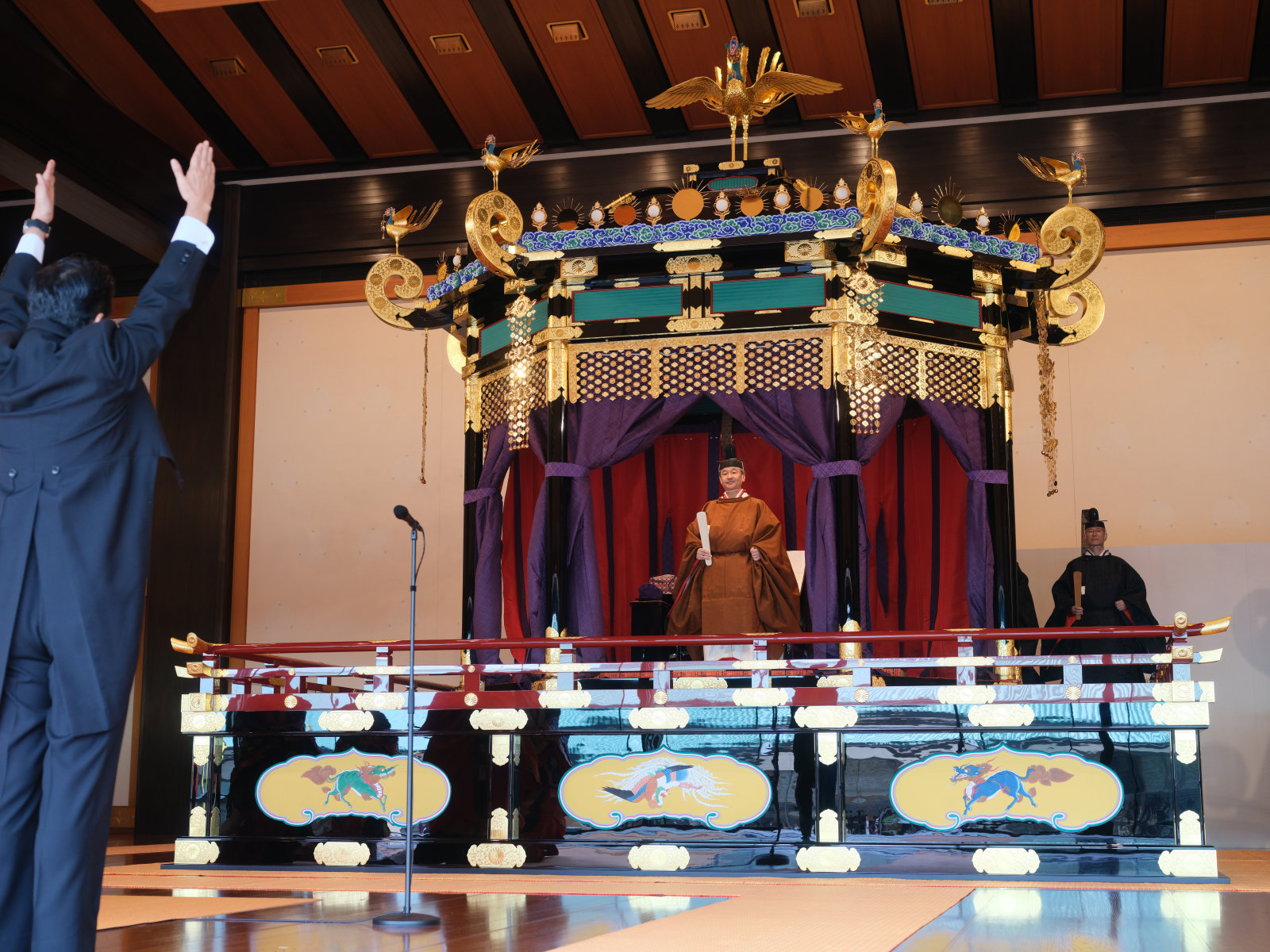
Enthronement ceremony of Emperor Naruhito with Prime Minister Shinzo Abe (October 22, 2019)

The origins of the Japanese imperial dynasty are obscure, and it bases its position on the claim that it has "reigned since time immemorial". There are no records of any emperor who was not said to have been a descendant of another, yet there is suspicion that Emperor Keitai (c. AD 500) may have been an unrelated outsider, though the sources (Kojiki, Nihon-Shoki) state that he was a male-line descendant of Emperor Ōjin. However, his descendants, including his successors, were according to records descended from at least one and probably several imperial princesses of the older lineage.

Millennia ago, the Japanese imperial family developed its own peculiar system of hereditary succession. It has been non-primogenitural, more or less agnatic, based mostly on rotation. Today, Japan uses strict agnatic primogeniture, which was adopted from Prussia, by which Japan was greatly influenced in the 1870s.

The controlling principles and their interaction were apparently very complex and sophisticated, leading to even idiosyncratic outcomes. Some chief principles apparent in the succession have been:

- Women were allowed to succeed (but there existed no known children of theirs whose father did not also happen to be an agnate of the imperial house, thus there is neither a precedent that a child of an imperial woman with a non-imperial man could inherit, nor a precedent forbidding it for children of empresses). However, female accession was clearly much more rare than male.
- Adoption was possible and a much used way to increase the number of succession-entitled heirs (however, the adopted child had to be a child of another member agnate of the imperial house).
- Abdication was used very often, and in fact occurred more often than death on the throne. In those days, the emperor's chief task was priestly (or godly), containing so many repetitive rituals that it was deemed that after a service of around ten years, the incumbent deserved pampered retirement as an honored former emperor.
- Primogeniture was not used – rather, in the early days, the imperial house practiced something resembling a system of rotation. Very often a brother (or sister) followed the elder sibling even in the case of the predecessor leaving children. The "turn" of the next generation came more often after several individuals of the senior generation. Rotation went often between two or more of the branches of the imperial house, thus more or less distant cousins succeeded each other. Emperor Go-Saga even decreed an official alternation between heirs of his two sons, which system continued for a couple of centuries (leading finally to shogun-induced (or utilized) strife between these two branches, the "southern" and "northern" emperors). Towards the end, the alternates were very distant cousins counted in degrees of male descent (but all that time, intermarriages occurred within the imperial house, thus they were close cousins if female ties are counted). During the past five hundred years, however, probably because of Confucian influence, inheritance by sons – but not always, or even most often, the eldest son has been the norm.

Historically, the succession to the Chrysanthemum Throne has always passed to descendants in male line from the imperial lineage. Generally, they have been males, though over the reign of one hundred monarchs there have been nine women (one pre-historical and eight historical) as emperor on eleven occasions.

Over a thousand years ago, a tradition started that an emperor should ascend relatively young. A dynast who had passed his toddler years was regarded suitable and old enough. Reaching the age of legal majority was not a requirement. Thus, a multitude of Japanese emperors have ascended as children, as young as 6 or 8 years old. The high-priestly duties were deemed possible for a walking child. A reign of around 10 years was regarded a sufficient service. Being a child was apparently a fine property, to better endure tedious duties and to tolerate subjugation to political power-brokers, as well as sometimes to cloak the truly powerful members of the imperial dynasty. Almost all Japanese empresses and dozens of emperors abdicated and lived the rest of their lives in pampered retirement, wielding influence behind the scenes. Several emperors abdicated to their entitled retirement while still in their teens. These traditions show in Japanese folklore, theater, literature, and other forms of culture, where the emperor is usually described or depicted as an adolescent.

Before the Meiji Restoration, Japan had eleven reigns of reigning empresses, all of them daughters of the male line of the Imperial House. None ascended purely as a wife or as a widow of an emperor. Imperial daughters and granddaughters, however, usually ascended the throne as a sort of a "stop gap" measure – if a suitable male was not available or some imperial branches were in rivalry so that a compromise was needed. Over half of Japanese empresses and many emperors abdicated once a suitable male descendant was considered to be old enough to rule (just past toddlerhood, in some cases). Four empresses, Empress Suiko, Empress Kōgyoku (also Empress Saimei), and Empress Jitō, as well as the legendary Empress Jingū, were widows of deceased emperors and princesses of the blood imperial in their own right. One, Empress Genmei, was the widow of a crown prince and a princess of the blood imperial. The other four, Empress Genshō, Empress Kōken (also Empress Shōtoku), Empress Meishō, and Empress Go-Sakuramachi, were unwed daughters of previous emperors. None of these empresses married or gave birth after ascending the throne.

Article 2 of the Meiji Constitution (the Constitution of the Empire of Japan) stated, "The Imperial Throne shall be succeeded to by imperial male descendants, according to the provisions of the Imperial House Law." The 1889 Imperial Household Law fixed the succession on male descendants of the imperial line, and specifically excluded female descendants from the succession. In the event of a complete failure of the main line, the throne would pass to the nearest collateral branch, again in the male line. If the empress did not give birth to an heir, the emperor could take a concubine, and the son he had by that concubine would be recognized as heir to the throne. This law, which was promulgated on the same day as the Meiji Constitution, enjoyed co-equal status with that constitution.

Article 2 of the Constitution of Japan, promulgated in 1947 by influence of the U.S. occupation administration, provides that "The Imperial Throne shall be dynastic and succeeded to in accordance with the Imperial Household Law passed by the Diet." The Imperial Household Law of 1947, enacted by the ninety-second and last session of the Imperial Diet, retained the exclusion on female dynasts found in the 1889 law. The government of Prime Minister Yoshida Shigeru hastily cobbled together the legislation to bring the Imperial Household in compliance with the American-written Constitution of Japan that went into effect in May 1947. In an effort to control the size of the imperial family, the law stipulates that only legitimate male descendants in the male line can be dynasts, that imperial princesses lose their status as imperial family members if they marry outside the imperial family, and that the emperor and other members of the Imperial Family may not adopt children. It also prevented branches, other than the branch descending from Taishō, from being imperial princes any longer.

=== Current status ===
Succession is now regulated by laws passed by the National Diet. The current law excludes women from the succession. A change to this law had been considered until Princess Kiko gave birth to Prince Hisahito.

Until the birth of Hisahito, son of Prince Akishino, on September 6, 2006, there was a potential succession problem, since Prince Akishino was the only male child to be born into the imperial family since 1965. Following the birth of Princess Aiko on December 1, 2001, there was public debate about amending the current Imperial Household Law to allow women to succeed to the throne. In January 2005, Prime Minister Junichiro Koizumi appointed a special panel composed of judges, university professors, and civil servants to study changes to the Imperial Household Law and to make recommendations to the government.

On October 25, 2005, the panel dealing with the succession issue recommended amending the law to allow females of the male line of imperial descent to ascend the Japanese throne. On January 20, 2006, Prime Minister Junichiro Koizumi devoted part of his annual keynote speech to the controversy, pledging to submit a bill allowing women to ascend the throne to ensure that the succession continues in the future in a stable manner. Shortly after the announcement that Princess Kiko was pregnant with her third child, Koizumi suspended such plans. As of 2025, her son, Prince Hisahito, is second in line to the throne under the current law of succession. On January 3, 2007, Prime Minister Shinzo Abe announced that he would drop the proposal to alter the Imperial Household Law.

Another proposed plan is to allow unmarried men from the abolished collateral branches of the imperial family to rejoin through adoption or marriage. This would be an emergency measure to ensure stable succession. It does not revise the Imperial Household Law. This does not restore the royalty of the 11 collateral branches of the Imperial House that were abolished in October 1947.

Crown Prince Akishino was formally declared first in line to the chrysanthemum throne on November 8, 2020.

== Burial traditions ==
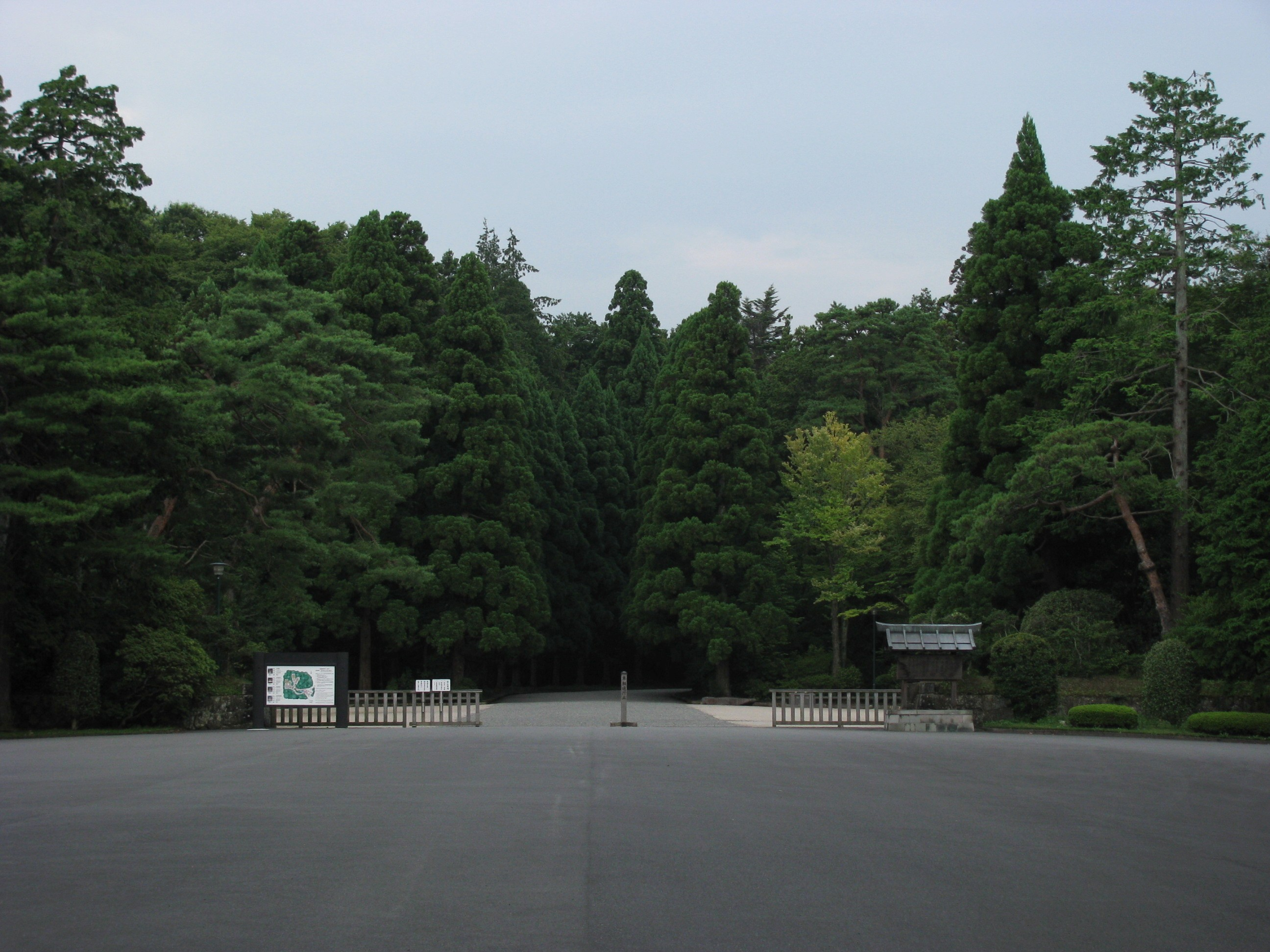
Entrance of the Musashi Imperial Graveyard in Hachiōji, Tokyo

During the Kofun period, so-called "archaic funerals" were held for the dead emperors, but only the funerary rites from the end of the period, which the chronicles describe in more detail, are known. They were centered around the rite of the mogari (殯), a provisional depository between death and permanent burial.

Empress Jitō was the first Japanese imperial personage to be cremated (in 703). After that, with a few exceptions, all emperors were cremated up to the Edo period. For the next 350 years, in-ground burial became the favoured funeral custom. Until 1912, the emperors were usually buried in Kyoto. From Emperor Taishō onward, the emperors have been buried at the Musashi Imperial Graveyard in Tokyo.

In 2013, the Imperial Household Agency announced that Emperor Akihito and Empress Michiko would be cremated after they die.

== Wealth ==
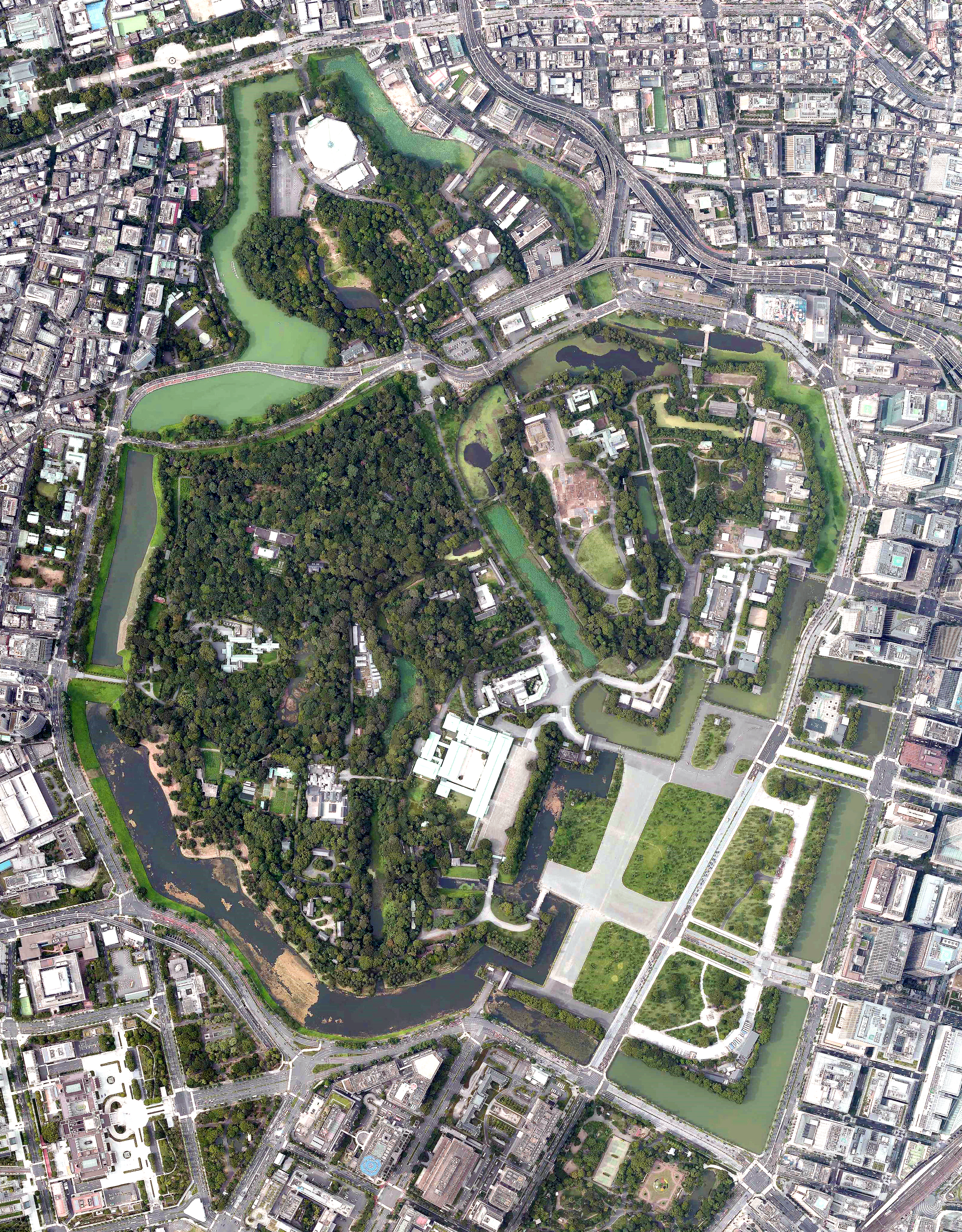
Tokyo Imperial Palace

Until the end of World War II, the Japanese monarchy was thought to be among the wealthiest in the world. Before 1911, no distinction was made between the imperial crown estates and the emperor's personal properties, which were considerable. The Imperial Property Law, which came into effect in January 1911, established two categories of imperial properties: the hereditary or crown estates and the personal ("ordinary") properties of the imperial family. The Imperial Household Minister was given the responsibility for observing any judicial proceedings concerning imperial holdings. Under the terms of the law, imperial properties were only taxable in cases where no conflict with the Imperial House Law existed; however, crown estates could only be used for public or imperially-sanctioned undertakings. Personal properties of certain members of the imperial family, in addition to properties held for imperial family members who were minors, were exempted from taxation. Those family members included the Empress Dowager, the Empress, the Crown Prince and Crown Princess, the Imperial Grandson and the consort of the Imperial Grandson. As a result of the poor economic conditions in Japan, 117,059.07 hectares (289,259.25 acres) of crown lands (about 26% of the total landholdings) were either sold or transferred to government and private-sector interests in 1921. In 1930, the Nagoya Detached Palace (Nagoya Castle) was donated to the city of Nagoya, with six other imperial villas being either sold or donated at the same time. In 1939, Nijō Castle, the former Kyoto residence of the Tokugawa shoguns and an imperial palace since the Meiji Restoration, was likewise donated to the city of Kyoto.

At the end of 1935, according to official government figures, the Imperial Court owned roughly 1,259,368 hectares (3,111,965 acres) of landed estates, the bulk of which (1,052,000 hectares (2,599,548 acres)) were the emperor's private lands, with the total acreage of the crown estates amounting to some 207,264 hectares (512,161 acres); those landholdings comprised palace complexes, forest and farm lands and other residential and commercial properties. The total value of the imperial properties was then estimated at ¥650 million, or roughly US$195 million at prevailing exchange rates. (Note: Roughly US$23.2 billion in 2022, in terms of relative income value. Williamson, Samuel H. (2023). "Seven Ways to Compute the Relative Value of a U.S. Dollar Amount, 1790 to Present". MeasuringWorth.) This was in addition to the emperor's personal fortune, which amounted to hundreds of millions of yen and included numerous family heirlooms and furnishings, purebred livestock and investments in major Japanese firms, such as the Bank of Japan, other major Japanese banks, the Imperial Hotel and Nippon Yusen.

Following Japan's defeat in the Second World War, all of the collateral branches of the imperial family were abolished under the Allied occupation of the country and the subsequent constitutional reforms, forcing those families to sell their assets to private or government owners. Staff numbers in the imperial households were slashed from a peak of roughly 6,000 to about 1,000. The imperial estates and the emperor's personal fortune (then estimated at US$17.15 million, or roughly US$800 million in 2024 terms) were transferred to either state or private ownership, excepting 2,760 hectares (6,810 acres) of landholdings. Since the 1947 constitutional reforms, the imperial family has been supported by an official civil list sanctioned by the Japanese government. The largest imperial divestments were the former imperial Kiso and Amagi forest lands in Gifu and Shizuoka prefectures, grazing lands for livestock in Hokkaido and a stock farm in the Chiba region, all of which were transferred to the Ministry of Agriculture, Forestry and Fisheries. Imperial property holdings have been further reduced since 1947 after several handovers to the government. Today, the primary imperial properties include the two imperial palaces at Tokyo and Kyoto, several imperial villas and a number of imperial farms and game preserves.

As of 2017, Akihito has an estimated net worth of US$40 million. The wealth and expenditures of the emperor and the imperial family have remained a subject of speculation and were largely withheld from the public until 2003, when Mori Yohei, a former royal correspondent for the Mainichi Shimbun, obtained access to 200 documents through a recently passed public information law. Mori's findings, which he published in a book, revealed details of the imperial family's US$240 million civil list (in 2003 values). Among other details, the book revealed the imperial family employed a staff of over 1,000 people. The total cost of events related to the enthronement of Emperor Naruhito was approximately 16.6 billion yen ($150 million) in 2019. This is 30% higher than Emperor Emeritus Akihito's accession (1990).

== See also ==
- Anti-monarchism in Japan
- Chrysanthemum taboo
- Controversies regarding the role of the Emperor of Japan
- Daijō Tennō
- Divine right of kings
- Emperor system
- Empress of Japan
- Family tree of Japanese monarchs
- Imperial House of Japan
- Japanese Air Force One
- Japanese honors system
- Japanese official state car
- List of emperors of Japan
- Reigning Emperor
- Sacred king
- State Shinto
