= Emperor system =

Japan's political system

Emperor system (天皇制, Tennōsei) means the Japanese monarchy or state-system centered on the emperor, known in Japanese as the Tennō.

In a narrow sense, "emperor system" refers to the monarchy or the emperor-centered system in the Constitution of the Empire of Japan. In a broad sense, "Emperor system" includes even the Symbolic Emperor System.

Under the Empire of Japan's political system, which called for the legitimacy of political domination by the Tennō, the term "Emperor system" was officially prohibited; it became an academic term when free discussions on the term "Emperor system" were held in postwar Japan and research papers using the term "Emperor system" were published.

== History ==
Around the A.D. 3rd century, the decomposition of the primitive community progressed, and the leaders of the primitive community elevated themselves as priests of the primitive religion to transcendental beings close to God and reigning as military and political rulers. In this evolution from the primitive monarchy to the ancient monarchy, regimes were formed in each Japanese region with the powerful head as the king. In it, the head of power in Kinai formed the Yamato regime, calling it "Okimi" as the leader of a coalition of governments.

The title "Emperor" (天皇) was adopted in 689 (Jitō period). Under the Ritsuryō established at the beginning of the 8th century, the emperor established himself as a Chinese-style emperor with diplomatic and military authority, the power to appoint officials, and punishment rights. However, at the end of the 12th century, when Minamoto no Yoritomo destroyed the Taira clan and established the Kamakura Shogunate, he effectively deprived the emperor of an important part of his rule, and later, before the Meiji era, the Shogunate system was maintained as the de facto ruler of Japan for a long time.

By the end of the Edo period, the Sonnō jōi movement had spread, while the Tennō emerged as the core of the Tobaku movement (倒幕運動, lit. "anti-Shogunate movement"). The new Meiji government overthrew the Edo Shogunate and established the Meiji Restoration and established the Meiji Constitution, establishing the Tennō as the head of state on article 1.

The Government of Meiji Japan is recognized for the introduction of a parliamentary system amid the disgruntled shizoku rebellion and the growth of the Freedom and People's Rights Movement. The Meiji government was modeled after that of the German Empire. Under this style of government, Japan became a modern state; the culture of sanctifying the emperor helped it to achieve unity.

During the prewar Shōwa era, ultranationalism was exploited by militarists and statist politicians who put forward the authority of the Tennō, which was considered sacred, leading to World War II.

The Supreme Commander for the Allied Powers, which occupied Japan after its defeat in the Pacific War, dismantled the "Emperor system". Among its results was the Humanity Declaration issued by the then reigning Tennō, Hirohito. The "Emperor system" was replaced by the "Symbolic Emperor System", with the Tennō as a national symbol with no political power.

== See also ==
- Anti-monarchism in Japan
- Emperor-system fascism
- Gozen Kaigi
- Kokutai
- Reigning Emperor
- Statism in Shōwa Japan
