= Reigning Emperor =

Honorific title of the emperor of Japan

Reigning Emperor (Japanese: 今上天皇, Hepburn: Kinjō Tennō) or Majesty (陛下, Heika), according to protocol, is the honorific title used in Japan to refer to the incumbent emperor instead of using their personal name (e.g. Hirohito), as is done in the West. The only context where the personal name is used is when referring to their time before taking the throne (e.g. Prince Hirohito 裕仁親王 Hirohito shinnō).

== History ==
Under the modern system, the posthumous name (諡号, shigō; colloquially gō) of the emperor will always match the era name or regnal year name (元号, gengō). However, this "one generation one title" (一世一元, issei ichigen) system was only implemented in the modern age of the Meiji Restoration. In the past, the emperor's name never matched the era name, and the change of the era name (改元, kaigen) could occur any number of times. Additionally, some emperors had two gō titles, when reoccupying the throne in a process called chōso (重祚). One example of this was Empress Kōgyoku, who later mounted the throne as Empress Saimei.

Attaching the title "Emperor" and his Japanese era name has formed a posthumous name, from "Emperor Meiji" to "Emperor Taishō" and "Emperor Shōwa", so doing it to refer to any living emperor, including those who have abdicated, is a faux pas.

== See also ==
- Arahitogami
- Kigensetsu
- Kofun
