= Numazu Imperial Villa =

- 沼津御用邸 / Numazu Goyōtei
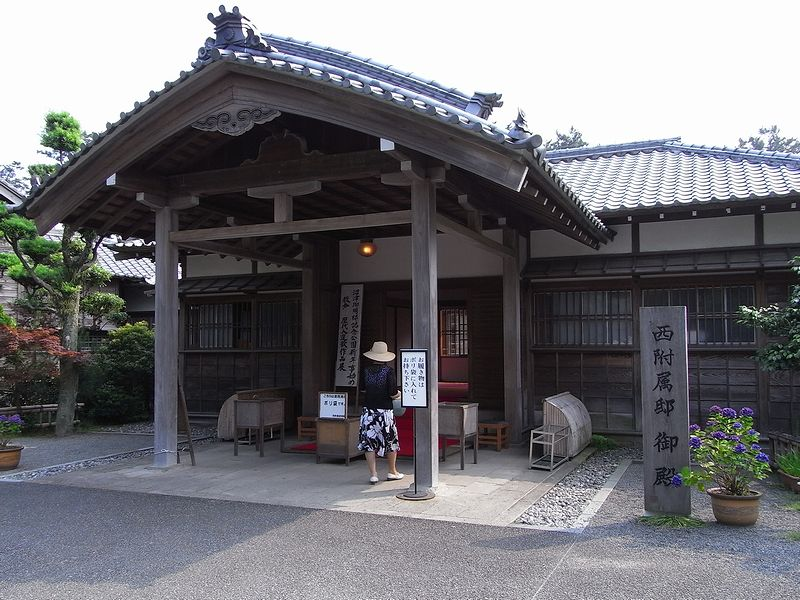
- Entrance of the Numazu Imperial Villa

- Location within Shizuoka Prefecture Location within Japan
- Location: Numazu, Shizuoka, Japan
- Coordinates: 35.072°N 138.873°E
- Area: 104,402 square meters
- Created: July 1893

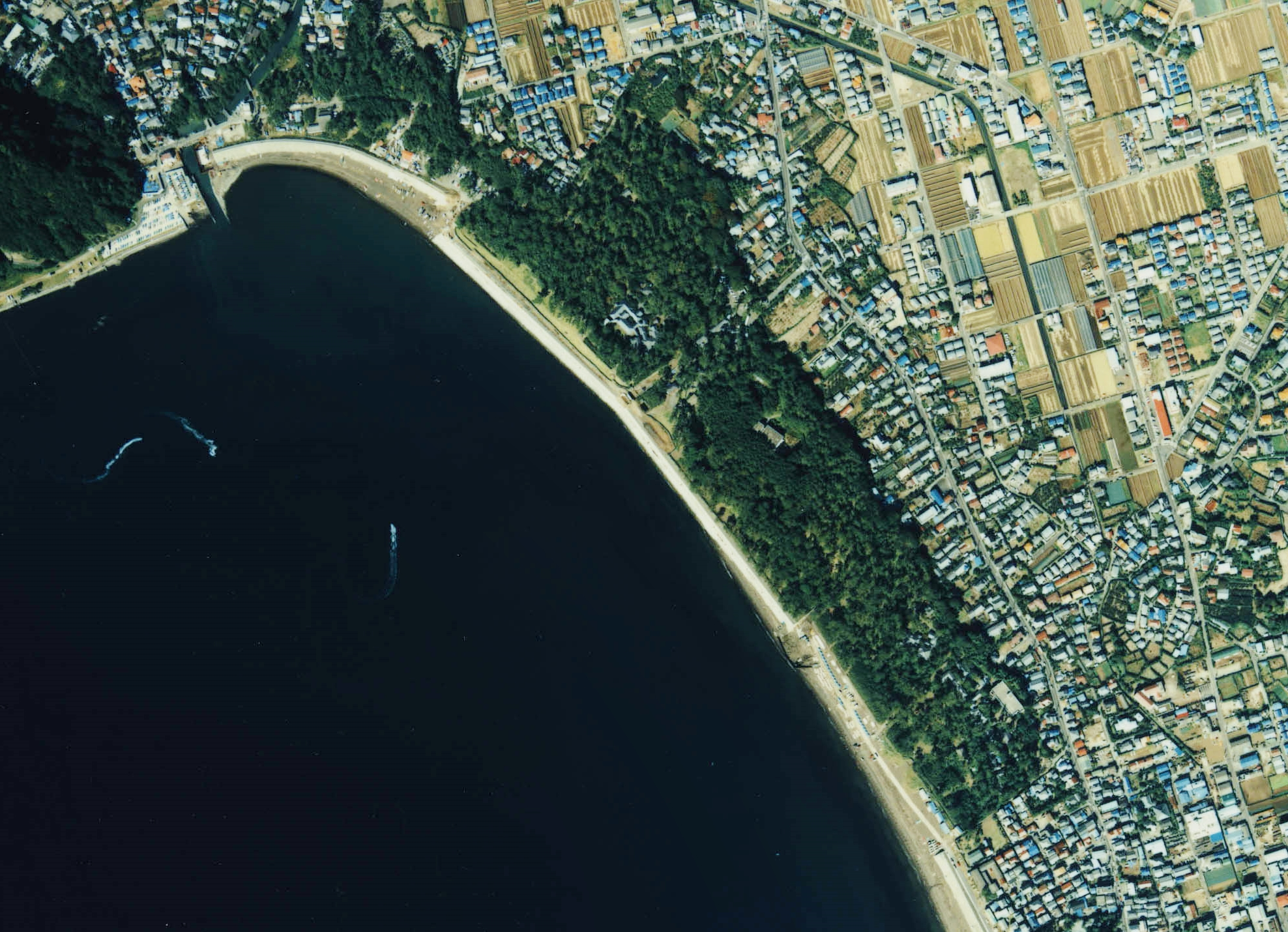
Aerial picture of Numazu Imperial Villa park

The Numazu Imperial Villa (沼津御用邸, Numazu Goyōtei) is a former imperial summer residence located in the city of Numazu, Shizuoka, Japan.

The villa was constructed by Emperor Meiji in July 1893 and was a favorite residence of his son, Crown Prince Yoshihito, the future Emperor Taishō. The building was a single-story wooden structure with an area of 1200 square meters. The grounds covered 104,402 square meters, and it was located facing Suruga Bay adjacent to the Senbon-Matsubara, a scenic pine grove. The villa also had views of Mount Fuji to the north-north west. In the neighborhood were the villas of a number of important political figures of the times, including that of Oyama Iwao, Saigō Jūdō and Ōki Takatō.

The villa was expanded twice, once in 1903 (the east annex) and once in 1905 (the west annex). The east annex was originally a building of the Akasaka Palace estate in Tokyo used by the high steward to the crown prince. The west annex was originally a villa belonging to count Kawamura Sumiyoshi. The future Emperor Hirohito spent 70 days at the villa as a child. During the bombing of Numazu in World War II, the main building of the villa was hit by an American bomb and burned down.

The villa was turned over to the Numazu city government in 1969, and was opened to the public as the Numazu Goyōtei Memorial Park (沼津御用邸記念公園, Numazu Goyōtei Kinen Kōen) in 1970.
