= Bombing of Numazu in World War II =

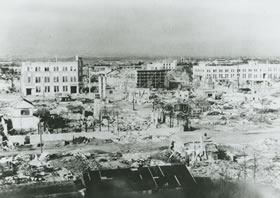
Numazu after the 1945 air raid

The bombing of Numazu (沼津大空襲, Numazu dai-kūshū) was part of the strategic bombing air raids on Japan campaign waged by the United States against military and civilian targets and population centers during the Japan home islands campaign in the closing stages of the Pacific War.

== Background ==
Although the city of Numazu was not a major population center, it had a number of targets of military significance centered on its port facility, including a ship repair yard, and a number of small and medium-sized factories supplying military equipment and munitions. The Tōkaidō Main Line railway connecting Tokyo with Osaka also ran through the city. Numazu was also located at the base of Mount Fuji, a prominent landmark used by bombers en route to Tokyo or Nagoya from the Mariana Islands, and thus often served as a secondary target for bombers unable to complete their primary mission assignment.

== Air raids ==
Numazu was bombed eight times during the war, the largest air raid occurring on the night of July 17, 1945. During this attack, 130 B-29 Superfortress bombers of the USAAF 20th Air Force, 58th Bombardment Wing dropped a total of 1,039 tons of incendiary bombs on the city, resulting in a firestorm which destroyed most of the city. The estimated civilian casualties were 274 people killed, and 9,523 homes destroyed in this raid; however, total casualties came to 322 killed, 634 severely injured, and 11,883 homes destroyed over the course of the war.

A year after the war, the United States Army Air Forces's Strategic Bombing Survey (Pacific War) reported that 89.5 percent of the city had been totally destroyed.

== See also ==
- Air raids on Japan
- Evacuations of civilians in Japan during World War II
- Grave of the Fireflies (short story), a semi-autobiographical short story set during the bombing
  - Grave of the Fireflies, an anime film based on the novel
