= Numazu =

Numazu 沼津市
- Special city
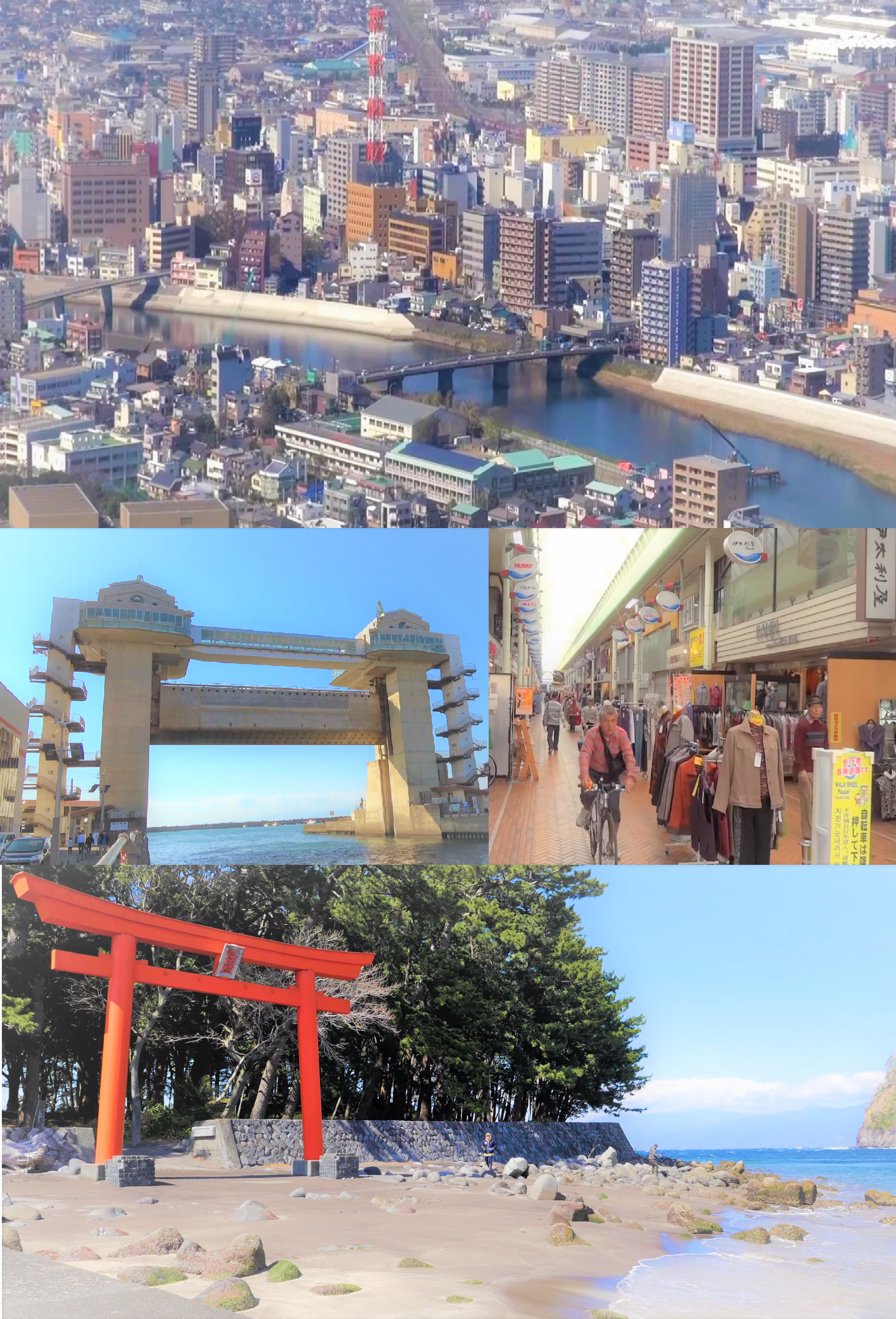
- City center, Byuo sluice, Numazu Nakamise Shopping Street, Torii in the Heda area

- Flag Seal

- Location of Numazu in Shizuoka Prefecture

- Coordinates: 35°05′44.1″N 138°51′48.4″E
- Country: Japan
- Region: Chūbu (Tōkai)
- Prefecture: Shizuoka

Government
  - Mayor: Shuichi Yorishige (頼重秀一) <from May 2018>

Area
  - Total: 186.96 km^{2} (72.19 sq mi)

Population (December 1, 2019)
  - Total: 189,486
  - Density: 1,013.5/km^{2} (2,625.0/sq mi)
- Time zone: UTC+9 (Japan Standard Time)
- Tree: Pine
- Flower: Crinum asiaticum
- Bird: Common gull
- Phone number: 055-931-2500
- Address: 16-1 Miyukichō, Numazu-shi, Shizuoka-ken 410-8601
- Website: Official website

Numazu (沼津市, Numazu-shi) is a city located in eastern Shizuoka Prefecture, Japan. As of 1 December 2019, the city had an estimated population of 189,486 in 91,986 households, and a population density of 1,014 persons per km^{2}. The total area of the city is 186.96 square kilometres (72.19 sq mi).

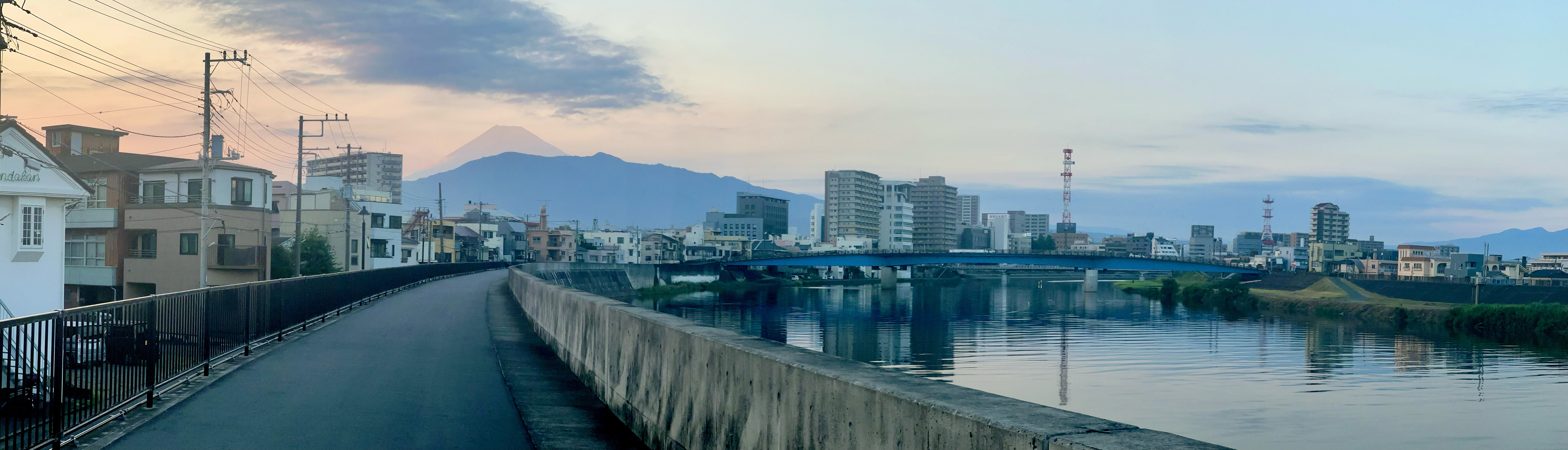
Mount Fuji seen from the streets of Numazu

Numazu seen from Minatoguchi Park, 2023

== Geography ==
Numazu is at the northwestern end of the Izu Peninsula, which is a leisure destination known for its numerous hot springs. Mount Fuji, Japan's tallest mountain, may also be seen from Numazu on clear days. Numazu is located 130 kilometres (81 mi) west of Tokyo and is on the Tōkaidō Main Line, the main railway line from Osaka to Tokyo. Warmed by the Kuroshio Current, the area enjoys a warm maritime climate with hot, humid summers and mild, cool winters. The Kano River runs through the middle of the city. Mount Ashitaka (1188 meters) is the highest point in the city.

=== Neighboring municipalities ===
Shizuoka Prefecture

- Mishima
- Fuji
- Izu
- Izunokuni
- Shimizu
- Nagaizumi
- Kannami

=== Climate ===
The city has a climate characterized by hot and humid summers, and relatively mild winters (Köppen climate classification Cfa). The average annual temperature in Numazu is 15.9 °C. The average annual rainfall is 1938 mm with September as the wettest month. The temperatures are highest on average in August, at around 26.8 °C, and lowest in January, at around 5.9 °C.

== Demographics ==
Per Japanese census data, the population of Numazu has been in slow decline over the past 30 years.

Historical population
Year	Pop.	±%
1960	163,581	—
1970	194,274	+18.8%
1980	208,708	+7.4%
1990	216,213	+3.6%
2000	211,559	−2.2%
2010	202,283	−4.4%

== History ==
Numazu is an ancient settlement, mentioned in Nara period records as the original provincial capital of Suruga Province before the separation of Izu Province from Suruga in 680 AD, and subsequent transfer of the provincial capital to the banks of the Abe River in what is now Shizuoka city. During the early part of the Tokugawa shogunate, Numazu was ruled as part of Odawara Domain, but with the construction of Numazu Castle in 1777, it became the separate Numazu Domain. Numazu prospered in the Edo period from its location on the Tōkaidō highway connecting Edo with Kyoto, with Numazu-juku and Hara-juku as two of the 53 post stations.

After the Meiji Restoration, Numazu Station was opened on the Tōkaidō Main Line on February 1, 1889. With the establishment of the modern municipalities system of the early Meiji period in 1889, the area was reorganized into Numazu Town within Suntō District, Shizuoka From its seaside location, Numazu gained a reputation as a health resort, which was further enhanced by its selection as the location of an imperial villa built for Emperor Meiji in 1893. The area become popular with other members of the nobility, statesmen (including Inoue Kaoru) and writers. Numazu town expanded in 1923 by merger with Yanagihara village, becoming Numazu City on July 1, 1923.

Central Numazu was destroyed by a fire in 1926. In 1944, the city further expanded through merger with neighboring Katahama, Kanaoka, Ooka and Shizuura villages. The city was a target for American air raids in World War II, and was largely destroyed by bombing on July 17, 1945.

In 1955, the villages of Ashitaka, Oohira, Uchiura, and Nishiura merged with Numazu, and in 1968 Hara Town also merged with Numazu. In the year 2000, Numazu was designated a Special City (特例市, Tokurei-shi) by the central government with increased local autonomy. In April 2005, the village of Heda (from Tagata District) was merged into Numazu. In 2007, Numazu hosted the 29th WorldSkills International Championship.

== Government ==
Numazu has a mayor-council form of government with a directly elected mayor and a unicameral city legislature of 28 members.

== Economy ==
Numazu is an industrial city and regional financial center, and its port is a major center of Shizuoka prefecture's commercial fishing industry. Numazu produces more dried Japanese horse mackerel than any other region in Japan. The city accounts for about half of Japan's total production. Agriculture is dominated by production of mandarin oranges and green tea, with Brussels sprouts, dairy products and rice as secondary products. Numazu is the location of the head office of Suruga Bank, Shizuoka Chuo Bank and Numazu Shinkin Bank.

== Education ==
Numazu has 24 public elementary schools, 17 public middle schools and one public combined middle/high school operated by the city government. The city has four public high schools operated by the Shizuoka Prefectural Board of Education. There are also one private elementary school, one private combined middle/high school and five private high schools. The prefecture also operates three special education schools in Numazu for the handicapped.

== Transportation ==
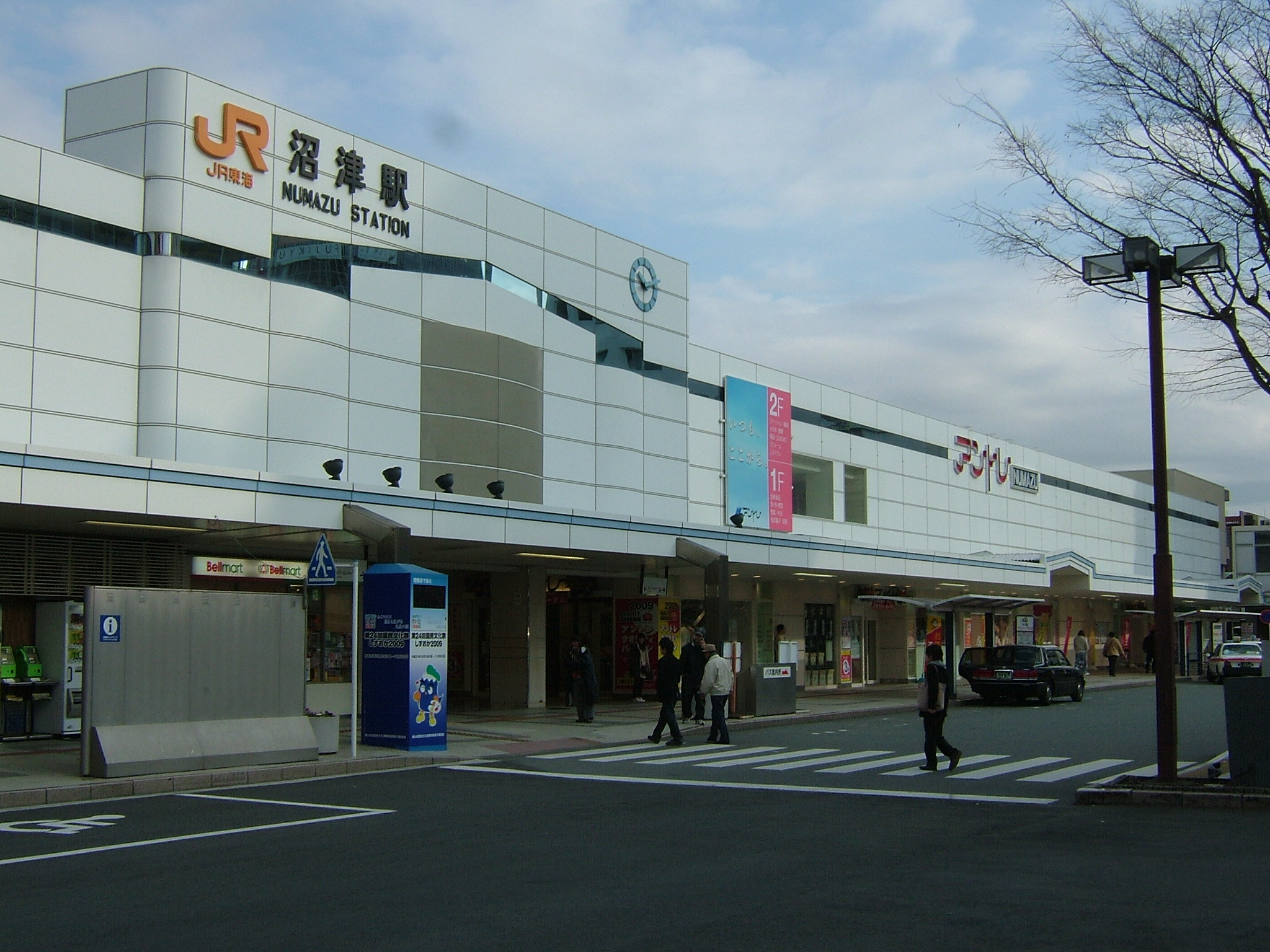
Numazu Station

=== Railway ===
- Central Japan Railway Company - Tōkaidō Main Line
  - Numazu - Katahama - Hara
- Central Japan Railway Company - Gotemba Line
  - Numazu - Ōoka

=== Highway ===
- AH1 Tomei Expressway
- Shin-Tōmei Expressway
- Izu-Jūkan Expressway
- National Route 1
- National Route 246
- National Route 414

== Local attractions ==
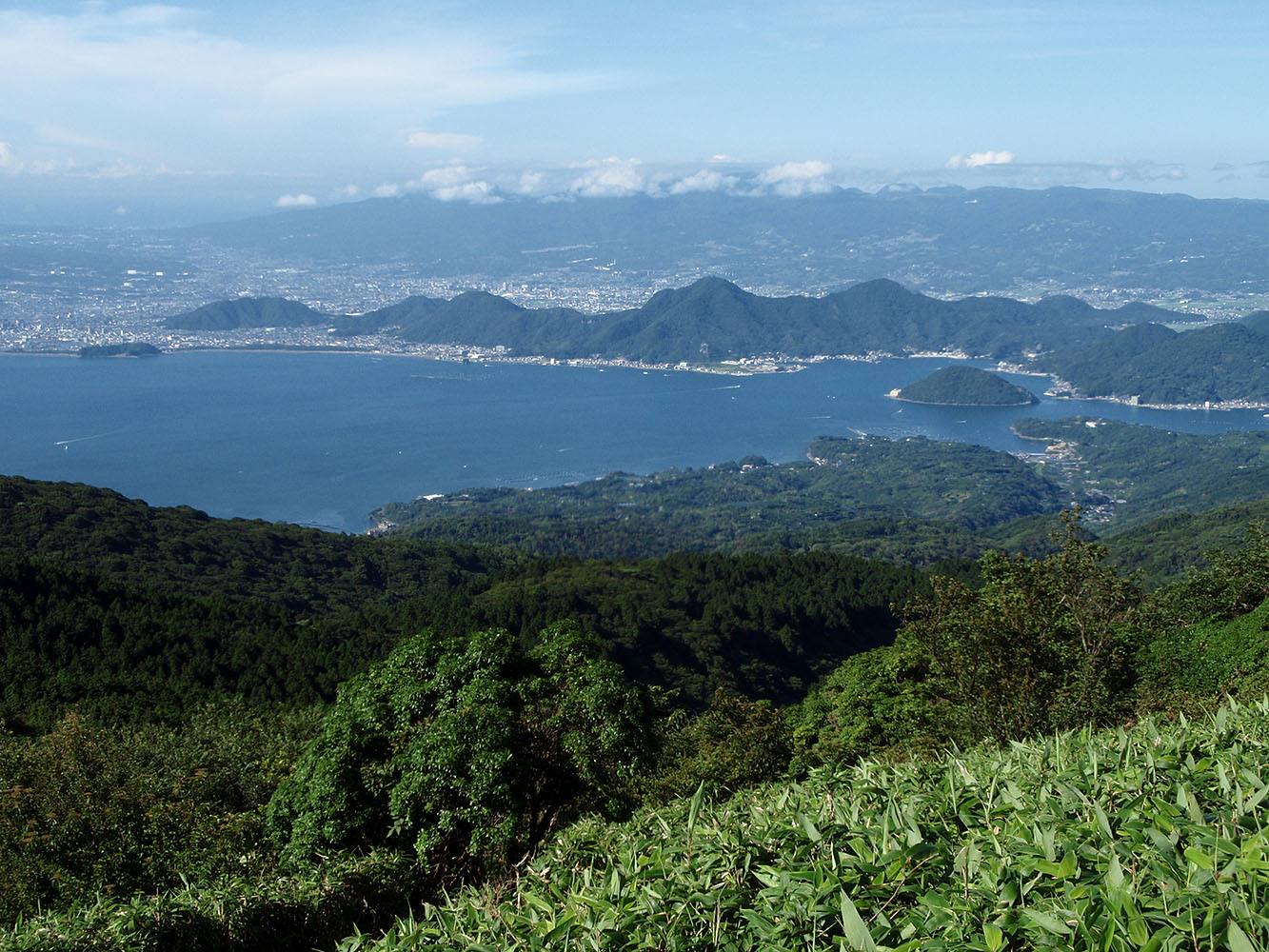
View from Mount Kinkan

Numazu is a gateway to Mount Fuji, Hakone, and Izu Peninsula, which are major tourist attractions. The harbour area has seafood restaurants and features an anti-tsunami barrier with an observation floor on top that offers a panoramic view of the city and the surrounding area. There is a shopping street close to the main train station.

Numazu has the longest coastline of any municipality in the prefecture. The Senbonhama ("Thousand Tree Beach") seaside is considered one of the best places to view Osezaki, Nihondaira, or the southern Japan Alps against the background of Sembonmatsubara and Mount Fuji. Three aquariums are located in Numazu: Mito Sea Paradise, Awashima Marine Park and Numazu Deepblue Aquarium.

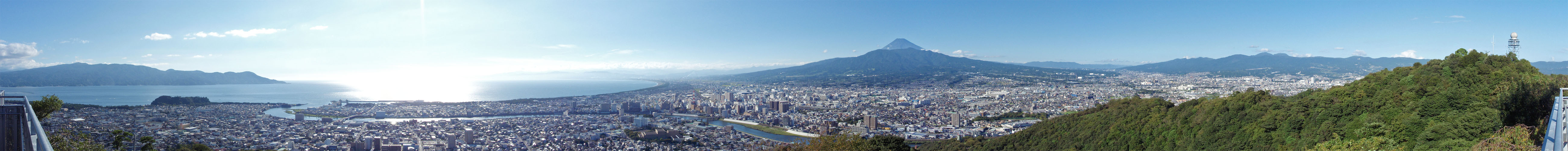
Numazu city from Mount Kanuki

=== National Historic Sites ===
- Nagahama Castle ruins
- Kōkokuji Castle ruins
- Yasumiba Archaeological Site

== Sister cities ==
- Kalamazoo, Michigan, United States, since 1963
- Yueyang, Hunan, China, since 1985
- Ueda, Nagano, Japan

== Notable people from Numazu ==
- Tomita Tsunejirō (1865–1937) – the earliest disciple of judo
- Nobutaka Machimura – politician
- Hayato Isomura – actor
- Shinji Ono – professional soccer player
- Masakuni Yamamoto – professional soccer player
- Kento Sugiyama – professional baseball player
- Kyoko Iwasaki – Olympic medalist swimmer
- Koji Murofushi – Olympic medalist in hammer-throw
- Miu Hirano – table tennis player
- Yamada Nagamasa – Sengoku period merchant-adventurer
- Norio Ohga – former CEO of Sony
- Tomoyoshi Murayama – artist and playwright
- Masato Harada – movie director
- Ulka Sasaki — mixed martial artist

== Popular culture ==
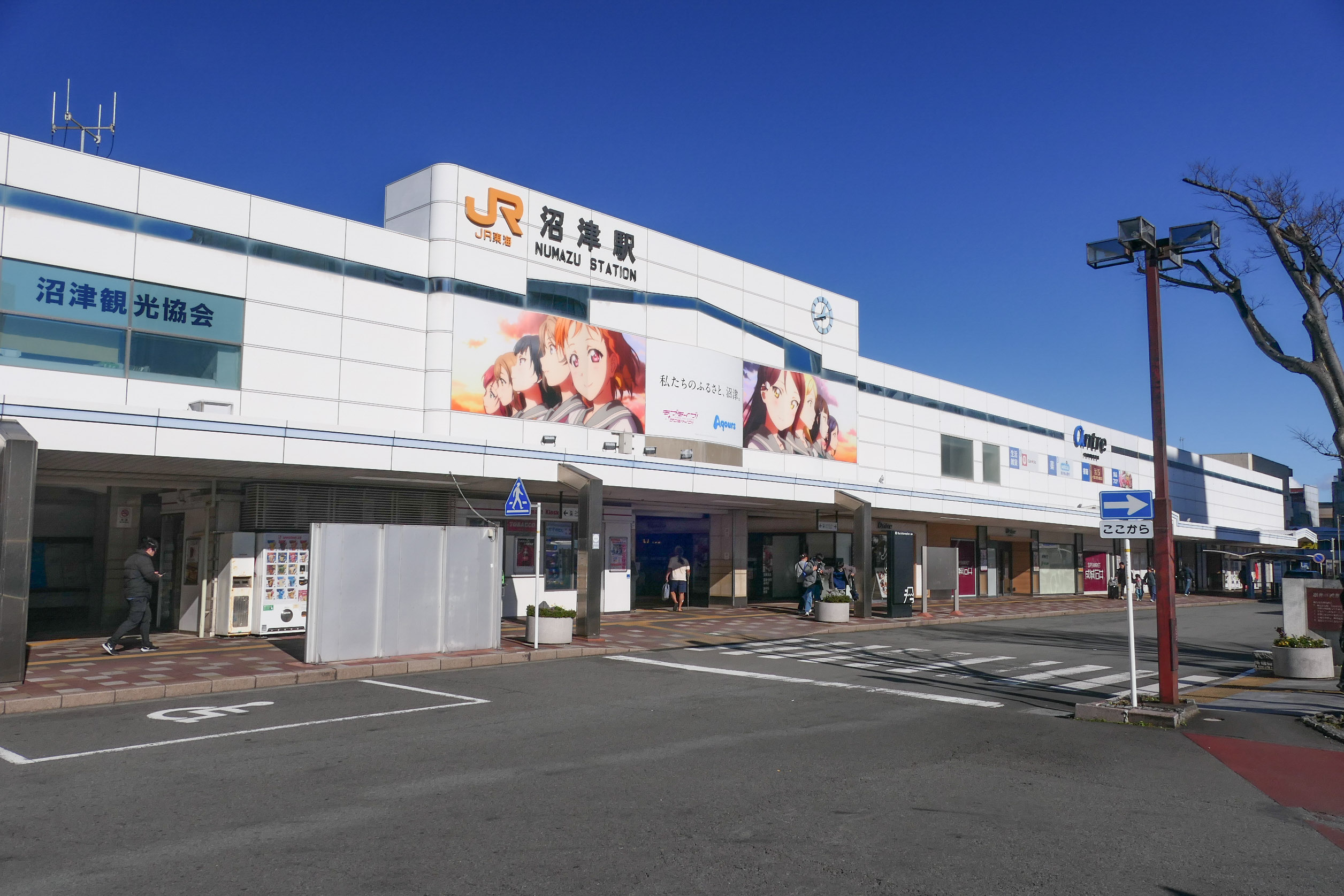
Love Live! Sunshine banner atop Numazu Station

Numazu is the main setting of the anime Love Live! Sunshine!!, and several characters live in Uchiura and Awashima Island. Various objects in the city, such as taxicabs, buses, ferries, and manhole covers, have special Love Live!-themed designs. As such, many tourists come to Numazu because of the anime. Anime Tourism Association noted that 181 locations in Shizuoka Prefecture are considered "pilgrimage" sites for Love Live! fans, including 40 percent of Numazu. A 2020 study by the Nippon Applied Informatics Society also found that tourism to Numazu has risen since the anime's premiere in 2016.
