= Anti-monarchism in Japan =

Opposition to monarchism in Japan

Anti-monarchism in Japan (天皇制廃止論, Ten'nōsei haishi-ron, lit. "Emperor system abolition theory") or anti-Emperor system (反天皇制, Han ten'nōsei) was a minor force during the twentieth century.

== History ==
In 1908, a letter allegedly written by Japanese revolutionaries denied the Emperor's divinity, and threatened his life. In 1910, Kōtoku Shūsui and 10 others plotted to assassinate the Emperor. In 1923, 1925 and 1932 Emperor Hirohito survived assassination attempts.

After World War II, the communists were antagonistic to the Emperor. The Japanese Communist Party demanded the abolition of the emperor system. They boycotted the formal opening of the National Diet in 1949 because of Emperor Shōwa's (Hirohito's) presence. The Japanese Communist Party continued to be antagonistic after Emperor Shōwa's death in 1989.

During the Imperial visits to Otsu, Japan in 1951, and Hokkaido in 1954, Communist posters and handbills antagonistic to the Imperial Family Members were plastered in the cities.

In 1951, three thousand students in Kyoto University protested against Emperor Shōwa's continued reign.

== See also ==
- Japanese dissidence during the Shōwa period
- Assassination attempts on Hirohito
- Aki no Arashi
- Hantenren
