= Succession to the Japanese throne =

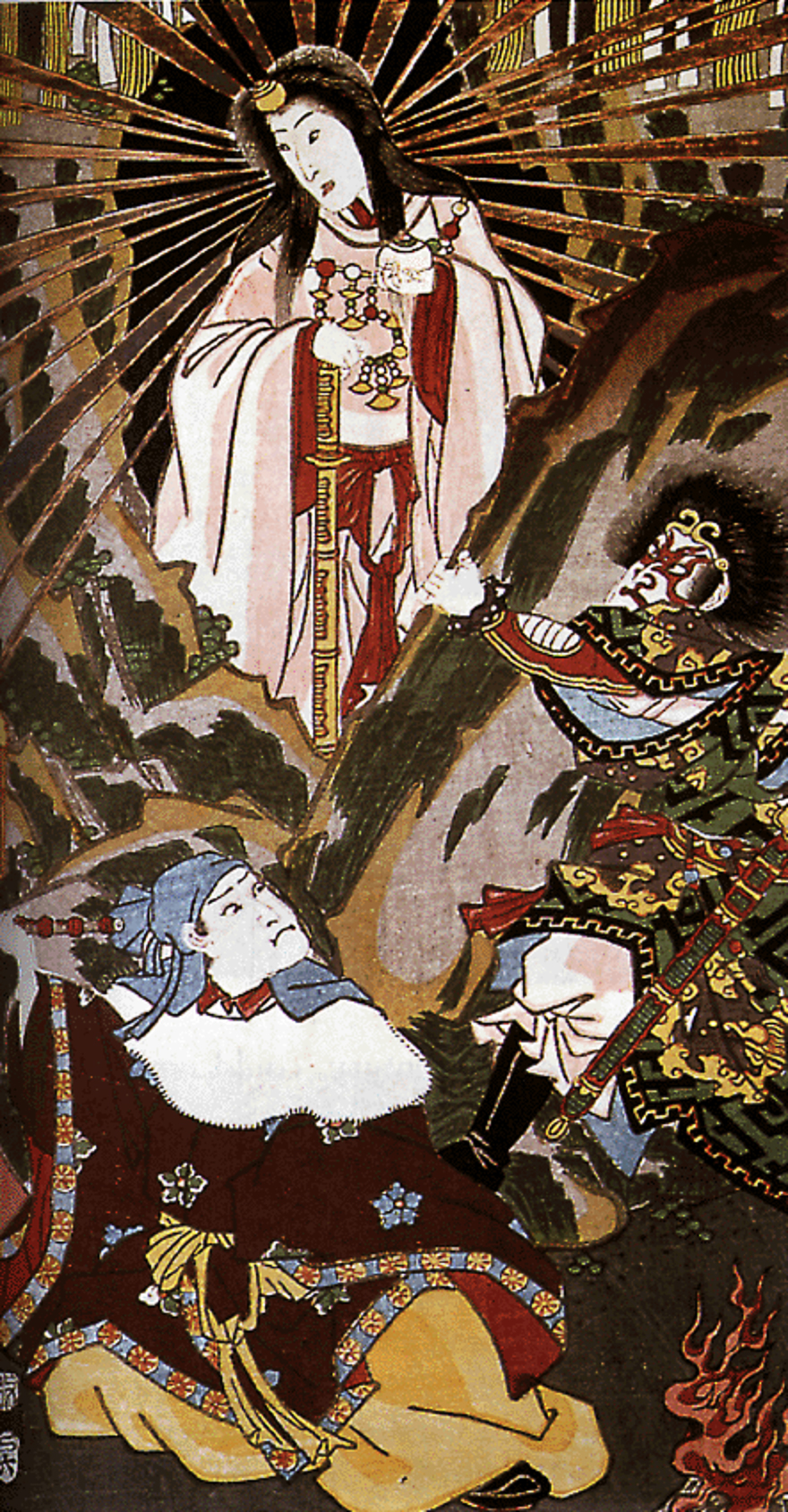
Amaterasu, the mythical ancestress of the Imperial House of Japan

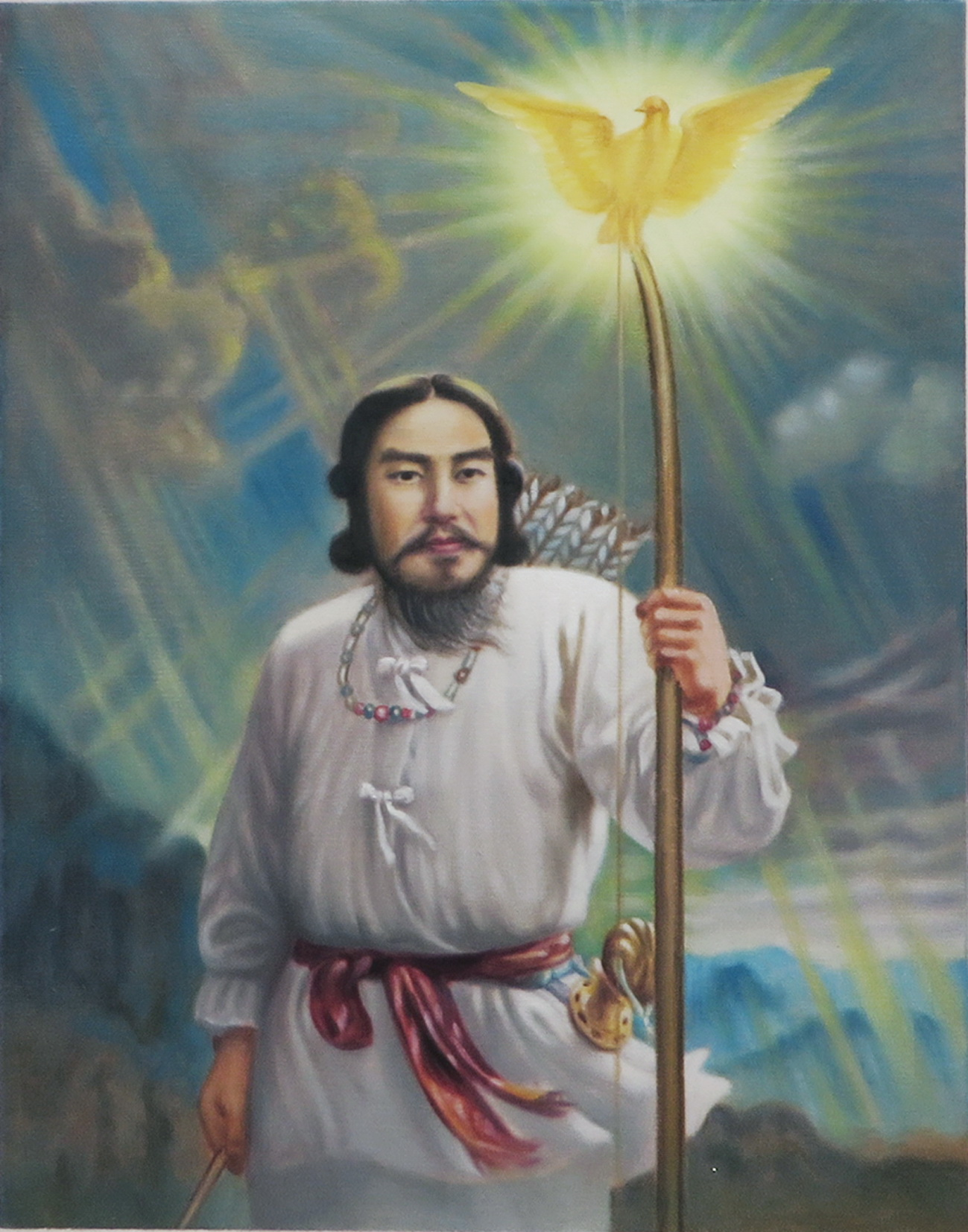
Emperor Jimmu, purported first Emperor

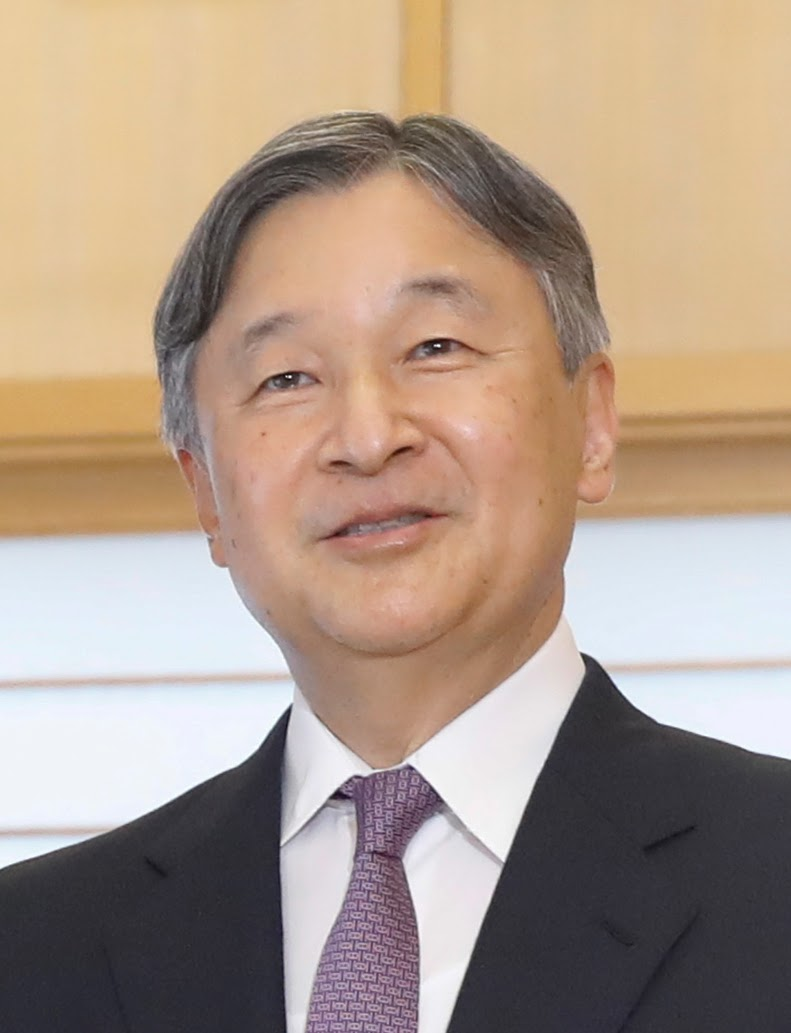
Emperor Naruhito, the present monarch

The current succession to the Japanese throne is governed by the Imperial Household Law, which stipulate agnatic primogeniture. Japanese government publicly responded to criticism from a committee of the UN which had voiced concerns about the exclusion of women from the line of succession to the Chrysanthemum Throne, stating that the succession system is a fundamental aspect of the country’s traditions and should not be subject to criticism.

== Current line of succession ==
The list below contains all people currently eligible to succeed to the throne.

- Emperor Shōwa (Hirohito; 1901–1989)
  - Emperor Emeritus Akihito (b. 1933)
    - Emperor Naruhito (b. 1960)
    - (1) Fumihito, Crown Prince Akishino (b. 1965)
      - (2) Prince Hisahito of Akishino (b. 2006)
  - (3) Masahito, Prince Hitachi (b. 1935)

== History ==
=== The Imperial House Law of 1889 ===
The Imperial House Law of 1889 was the first Japanese law to regulate the imperial succession. Until October 1947, when it was abolished and replaced with the Imperial Household Law, it defined the succession to the throne under the principle of agnatic primogeniture.

In all instances, the succession proceeded from the eldest male heir to the youngest (Ch. I: Article 3). In the majority of cases, the legitimate sons and male heirs of an emperor were favoured over those born to concubines. Illegitimate sons would only be eligible to succeed if no other male heirs existed in the direct line; however, the illegitimate sons of an emperor had precedence over any legitimate brothers of the emperor (Ch. I: Article 4). Those in the line of succession suffering from "incurable diseases of mind or body," or when "any other weighty cause exists," could be passed over with the advice of the Imperial Family Council, headed by the emperor, and after consulting the Privy Council (Ch. I: Article 9).

On 11 February 1907, an amendment was made to the Imperial House Law to reduce the numbers of imperial princes in the shinnōke and ōke, the cadet branches of the imperial family, who were fifth– or sixth-generation descendants of an emperor. The amendment provided for princes to leave the imperial family, either by imperial decree or by imperial sanction. They were then granted a family name and assumed the status of nobles with the peerage titles of marquis or count, thereby becoming subjects (Article I). Alternatively, a prince could be formally adopted into a noble family or succeed to the headship of an imperial family line as a noble (Article II). Under the terms of the amendment, those former princes and their descendants who left the imperial family were excluded from the line of succession and made ineligible to return to the imperial family at any future date (Article VI).

== Historic line of succession according to the Imperial House Law of 1889 (as of October 1947) ==
As of October 14, 1947, when the Imperial Household Law abolished the shinnōke (Princely Houses of the Blood) and ōke (Princely Houses) cadet branches, the immediate line of succession to the Japanese throne was as follows:

- Emperor Taishō (Yoshihito; 1879–1926)
  - **The Emperor** (Hirohito; born 1901)
    - **(1)** The Prince Tsugu (Akihito; b. 1933)
    - **(2)** The Prince Yoshi (Masahito; b. 1935)
  - **(3)** The Prince Chichibu (Yasuhito; b. 1902)
  - **(4)** The Prince Takamatsu (Nobuhito; b. 1905)
  - **(5)** The Prince Mikasa (Takahito; b. 1915)
    - **(6)** Prince Tomohito of Mikasa (b. 1946)

Prior to this date, the imperial succession was defined by the Imperial House Law of 1889. As the Taishō Emperor had no brothers, if the main family line had become extinct, the imperial line would have continued through the Fushimi-no-miya shinnōke cadet branch under the terms of the 1889 house law. The Fushimi-no-miya house constitute the nearest direct-male line of imperial descendants who still had succession rights, Takatsukasa, Konoe, and Ichijo are technically closer biologically but disregarded with ther adoption. Even if we regard those three families as still having rights, Prince Fushimi Kuniie was adopted by Emperor Kōkaku as his son in 1817, giving his branch a priority. In Japanese law and custom, adoption fully replaced previous blood ties, meaning that an adopted son was integrated into his new family as if born into it, with all rights of inheritance and succession. Historically, the imperial family often sustained its agnatic line through such adoptions from other imperial branches. This would be later banned by the said House Law in 1889.

The princes of Fushimi-no-miya were all descended from Prince Fushimi Kuniie (1802–1872), a 12th-generation descendant of the Northern Court pretender "Emperor" Sukō, who was himself the grandson of the 93rd emperor Go-Fushimi. Prince Fushimi Kuniie had 17 sons, 3 of which were by the prince's wife Princess Takatsukasa Hiroko (including his future heirs, Prince Sadanori and Prince Fushimi Sadanaru) and the rest were all by various concubines, of whom five begat ōke that were extant as of 1947. A 1907 amendment to the Imperial House Law further reduced the number of imperial princes eligible to succeed to the throne. Prince Chichibu and Prince Takamatsu had no known children. Prince Yoshi has no known children either. All of the five grandchildren of Prince Mikasa who were born into the imperial family, after being conceived by sons Tomohito and Takamado, were female granddaughters as well. By the amended 1889 house law, the imperial line of succession continued as follows:

[bold - currently extant branches. Death dates given for the last living heads of extinct branches.]

=== Cadet branches before October 14, 1947 ===
- Prince Fushimi Kuniie (1802–1872) (**Fushimi-no-miya**)
  - Prince Fushimi Sadanaru (1858–1923)
    - Prince Fushimi Hiroyasu (1875–1946)
      - Prince Fushimi Hiroyoshi (1897–1938)
        - **(7)** Prince Fushimi Hiroaki (b. 1932)
  - Prince Yamashina Akira (1816–1891) (Yamashina-no-miya)
    - Prince Yamashina Kikumaro (1873–1908)
      - **(8)** Prince Yamashina Takehiko (1898–1987)
  - Prince Kuni Asahiko (1824–1891) (**Kuni-no-miya**)
    - Prince Kuni Kuniyoshi (1873–1929)
      - **(9)** Prince Kuni Asaakira (b. 1901)
        - **(10)** Prince Kuni Kuniaki (b. 1929)
        - **(11)** Prince Kuni Asatake (b. 1940)
        - **(12)** Prince Kuni Asahiro (b. 1944)
    - Prince Kaya Kuninori (1867–1909) (**Kaya-no-miya**)
      - **(13)** Prince Kaya Tsunenori (b. 1900)
        - **(14)** Prince Kaya Kuninaga (b. 1922)
        - **(15)** Prince Kaya Harunori (b. 1926)
        - **(16)** Prince Kaya Akinori (b. 1929)
        - **(17)** Prince Kaya Fuminori (b. 1931)
        - **(18)** Prince Kaya Munenori (b. 1935)
        - **(19)** Prince Kaya Takenori (b. 1942)
    - **(20)** Prince Asaka Yasuhiko (b. 1887) (**Asaka-no-miya**)
      - **(21)** Prince Asaka Takahiko (b. 1912)
        - **(22)** Prince Asaka Tomohiko (b. 1943)
    - **(23)** Prince Higashikuni Naruhiko (b. 1887) (**Higashikuni-no-miya**)
      - **(24)** Prince Higashikuni Morihiro (b. 1916)
        - **(25)** Prince Higashikuni Nobuhiko (b. 1945)
    - **(30)** Prince Nashimoto Morimasa (1874–1951) (Nashimoto-no-miya)
  - Prince Kitashirakawa Yoshihisa (1847–1895) (Kitashirakawa-no-miya)
    - Prince Kitashirakawa Naruhisa (1887–1923)
      - Prince Kitashirakawa Nagahisa (1910–1940)
        - **(26)** Prince Kitashirakawa Michihisa (1937–2018)
    - Prince Takeda Tsunehisa (1882–1919) (**Takeda-no-miya**)
      - **(27)** Prince Takeda Tsuneyoshi (b. 1909)
        - **(28)** Prince Takeda Tsunetada (b. 1940)
        - **(29)** Prince Takeda Tsuneharu (b. 1944)
  - Prince Kan'in Kotohito (1865–1945) (Kan'in-no-miya)
    - **(31)** Prince Kan'in Haruhito (1902–1988)

=== Extant cadet branches ===
Includes individuals' possible positions in the line of succession were the cadet branches to be reinstated. All princes born before October 14, 1947, lost their titles from that date.

- Prince Fushimi Kuniie (1802–1872) (**Fushimi-no-miya**)
  - Prince Fushimi Sadanaru (1858–1923)
    - Prince Fushimi Hiroyasu (1875–1946)
      - Prince Fushimi Hiroyoshi (1897–1938)
        - **(4)** Prince Fushimi Hiroaki (b. 1932)
  - Prince Kuni Asahiko (1824–1891) (**Kuni-no-miya**)
    - Prince Kuni Kuniyoshi (1873–1929)
      - Prince Kuni Asaakira (1901–1959)
        - Prince Kuni Kuniaki (1929-2026)
          - **(5)** Kuni Asataka (b. 1959)
          - **(6)** Kuni Kuniharu (b. 1961)
        - **(7)** Prince Kuni Asatake (b. 1940)
          - **(8)** Kuni Asatoshi (b. 1971)
            - **(9)** Unknown son of Kuni Asatoshi (b. 2013)
        - **(10)** Prince Kuni Asahiro (b. 1944)
    - Prince Kaya Kuninori (1867–1909) (**Kaya-no-miya**)
      - Prince Kaya Tsunenori (1900–1978)
        - Prince Kaya Akinori (1929–1994)
          - **(11)** Kaya Masanori (b. 1959)
            - **(12)** Kaya Hidenori (b. 1996)
            - **(13)** Kaya Takanori (b. 1998)
    - Prince Asaka Yasuhiko (1887–1981) (**Asaka-no-miya**)
      - Prince Asaka Takahiko (1912–1994)
        - **(14)** Prince Asaka Tomohiko (b. 1943)
          - **(15)** Asaka Akihiko (b. 1972)
    - Prince Higashikuni Naruhiko (1887–1990) (**Higashikuni-no-miya**)
      - Prince Higashikuni Morihiro (1916–1969)
        - Prince Higashikuni Nobuhiko (1945–2019)
          - **(16)** Higashikuni Masahiko (b. 1973)
            - **(17)** Unknown first son of Higashikuni Masahiko (b. 2010)
            - **(18)** Unknown second son of Higashikuni Masahiko (b. 2014)
        - **(19)** Higashikuni Naohiko (b. 1953)
          - **(20)** Higashikuni Teruhiko (b. 1979)
            - **(21)** Unknown son of Higashikuni Teruhiko (b. 2004)
          - **(22)** Higashikuni Mutsuhiko (b. 1980)
            - **(23)** Unknown son of Higashikuni Mutsuhiko (b. 2012)
        - **(24)** Higashikuni Morihiko (b. 1967)
  - Prince Kitashirakawa Yoshihisa (1847–1895) (Kitashirakawa-no-miya)
    - Prince Takeda Tsunehisa (1882–1919) (**Takeda-no-miya**)
      - Prince Takeda Tsuneyoshi (1909–1992)
        - **(25)** Prince Takeda Tsunetada (b. 1940)
          - **(26)** Takeda Tsunetaka (b. 1974)
        - **(27)** Prince Takeda Tsuneharu (b. 1944)
          - **(28)** Takeda Tsuneaki (b. 1979)
          - **(29)** Takeda Tsunetomo (b. 1980)
        - **(30)** Takeda Tsunekazu (b. 1947)
          - **(31)** Takeda Tsuneyasu (b. 1975)
            - **(32)** Unknown son of Tsuneyasu Takeda (b. 2024)
          - **(33)** Takeda Tsuneyoshi (b. 1978)

The Nashimoto collateral branch became extinct in 1951, followed by the Yamashina in 1987, the Kan'in in 1988, and the Kitashirakawa in 2018. The main Fushimi-no-miya line and the Kaya, Kuni, Asaka, Higashikuni, and Takeda collateral branches remain extant, though the present head of the Fushimi-no-miya family lacks a male heir to continue his lineage.

=== Shōwa period succession debates and controversies ===
Debate over the imperial succession was first raised in the late 1920s, after Emperor Shōwa's accession. For the first eight years of their marriage, the emperor and empress only had girls; as a result, the emperor's younger brother, Prince Chichibu, remained first in line and heir presumptive to the throne until the birth of Crown Prince Akihito in December 1933. As a career military officer and known nationalist with radical leanings, the prince enjoyed close relations with the rightist faction in the military. During the early 1930s, his strong support for the "Imperial Way" faction in the army was an open secret; he cultivated strong friendships with several junior officers who were later instrumental in leading the revolt during the February 26 Incident.

A large number of "Imperial Way" followers in the military were critical of the emperor for his scientific interests, self-effacing demeanour and presumed pacifism, considering him a "mediocre" individual easily manipulated by corrupt advisors. With his political leanings, Prince Chichibu antagonized his elder brother, who strongly reprimanded him on several occasions and arranged for his posting to unimportant positions where he could be more closely watched. Apart from Prince Chichibu, the February 26 rebels relied on the tacit support of Princes Asaka and Higashikuni, both senior army generals and imperial princes who were leaders within the "Imperial Way" faction and had close ties to prominent rightist groups. If the emperor had either died or had been compelled to abdicate, Prince Chichibu would have received strong support from the rightists as the regent for Crown Prince Akihito; however, he was reported to have distanced himself from the "Imperial Way" officers following the suppression of the February 26 revolt. Still, in 1938, Prince Saionji expressed his worry that Prince Chichibu might someday usurp the throne by violent means. By October 1940, however, Prince Chichibu had become seriously ill with pulmonary tuberculosis, and led a retired life from then on. He was quietly passed over in the line of succession in favour of his brother Prince Takamatsu, who began to undertake more official duties. In an emergency, Prince Takamatsu was intended to assume the regency for his nephew the Crown Prince.

In July 1944, though the hopelessness of Japan's war effort became clear after the loss of Saipan, the emperor persisted in defending Prime Minister Tojo and his government and refused to dismiss him. Recognising the emperor's continued obstructiveness would lead to certain defeat, Marquess Kido Koichi, the Lord Privy Seal, quietly consulted with Konoe Fumimaro and the emperor's uncle General Prince Higashikuni Naruhiko about the possibility of forcing the emperor to abdicate in favour of his son the Crown Prince, and declaring a regency with Prince Takamatsu as regent. On 8 July, the decision was formally taken, with Prince Takamatsu endorsing it several days later. By this plan, Prince Higashikuni would replace Tojo as prime minister and attempt to negotiate a settlement with the Allies. However, the plan was ultimately dismissed as being too risky. Konoe had informed Kido of rumours that if such a situation were to arise, radicals in the military would stage a coup and take the emperor to Manchuria, still considered a safe location for a government, or replace him on the throne with a more militant imperial prince. In the event, Kido and Konoe used the influence of the Emperor’s mother, Empress Teimei, the Prince Takamatsu and his uncles the Princes Asaka and Higashikuni to pressure the emperor to ask for Tojo's resignation; this strategy proved successful, and Tojo resigned his posts on 18 July.

== Current succession rules ==
Article 2 of the Constitution of Japan provides that "The Imperial Throne shall be dynastic and succeeded to in accordance with the Imperial Household Law passed by the Diet." The Imperial Household Law of 1947 enacted by the 92nd and last session of the Imperial Diet, retained the exclusion on female dynasts found in the 1889 law. The government of Prime Minister Shigeru Yoshida cobbled together the legislation to bring the Imperial House in compliance with the American-written Constitution of Japan that went into effect in May 1947. In an effort to control the size of the imperial family, the law stipulates that only legitimate male descendants in the male line can ascend the throne; that naishinnō (imperial princesses) and joō (princesses) lose their status as imperial family-members if they marry outside the imperial family; that shinnō (imperial princes), other than the crown prince, ō (princes), unmarried imperial princesses and princesses, and the widows of imperial princes and princes may, upon their own request or in the event of special circumstances, renounce their membership in the imperial family with approval of the Imperial House Council; and that the Emperor and other members of the imperial family may not adopt children. The Imperial Household Law was amended in July 2026 to create a procedure for the adoption of male-line descendants of former male members of the imperial family into the line of descent, and to allow some female members of the imperial family to retain their rank after marrying.

For an imperial abdication to take place, such as the one that took place in April 2019, it requires special legislation and cannot be explicitly expressed by the monarch himself.

== Heisei/Reiwa period succession crisis ==
Before September 2006, there was a potential succession crisis since no male child had been born into the imperial family since Prince Akishino in 1965. Following the birth of Princess Aiko, there was significant public debate about amending the Imperial House Law to allow female descendants of an emperor and their descendants to succeed to the throne. In January 2005, Prime Minister Junichiro Koizumi appointed a special panel of judges, university professors, and civil servants to study changes to the Imperial House Law and to make recommendations to the government.

On January 24, 2005, the Japanese government announced that it would consider allowing the Crown Prince and Crown Princess to adopt a male child, in order to avoid a possible succession disputes. Adoption from other male-line branches of the Imperial Line is an age-old imperial Japanese tradition for dynastic purposes, prohibited only in modern times after the adoption in 1947 of the American-written Constitution of Japan. The child would presumably be adopted from one of the former imperial branches which lost imperial status after World War II. However, a government-appointed panel of experts submitted a report on November 24, 2005, recommending that the imperial succession law be amended to permit absolute primogeniture. The birth of Prince Hisahito temporarily relieved this discussion of urgency, but it continues to be a subject of debate.

=== Proposed changes and 2026 amendments ===
As above, the liberal wing of the Diet of Japan has proposed absolute primogeniture, which would permit the women of the existing imperial household to serve as empress as well as produce heirs. Prince Tomohito of Mikasa opposed the introduction of absolute primogeniture, as have several Japanese lawmakers.

The conservative wing of the Diet has proposed un-abolishing the Fushimi-no-miya and its branch lines, the Ōke. The Ōke are descended by a direct-male line from Emperor Sukō, who died in 1398. The Ōke families have not been considered aristocrats since 1947 and their descendants are engaged in various private business and media concerns. Notably, the far-right YouTuber Takeda Tsuneyasu, whose YouTube account was terminated in 2018 for hate speech violations, is a male-line heir to the Takeda-no-miya as a nephew of the current head.

A 2005 poll found that 71% of the Japanese public believe the imperial family should have input on the succession problem.

In November 2020, it was recommended that the discussion be shelved until Prince Hisahito himself becomes an adult and begins producing offspring. This proposition has been criticized as possibly delaying the debate until the women of the imperial house would be too old to have children, as getting married removes them from the imperial house; however, such a law may retroactively bring princesses back into the family and resolve this problem.

In September 2021, it was considered to amend the Imperial Household Law and allow the 85-year-old Prince Hitachi to adopt a male member of the collateral branches of the imperial family.

In December 2021, a government-appointed expert panel submitted a report on securing a stable imperial succession and maintaining the number of members of the imperial family. The panel concluded that the existing line of succession from Emperor Naruhito through Crown Prince Fumihito to Prince Hisahito should not be altered, and considered it premature to determine the succession beyond Hisahito. It treated the declining number of imperial family members as a separate and more immediate issue, proposing three possible measures: allowing female members of the imperial family to retain their status after marriage; permitting imperial family members to adopt male-line male descendants of former imperial branches; and directly granting imperial status by law to eligible male-line male descendants.

Following further discussions in the National Diet, the government submitted the Bill for Partial Amendment of the Imperial Household Law and Related Laws to the 221st session of the Diet on June 30, 2026, as Cabinet Bill No. 64. The bill passed the House of Representatives on July 10. It was approved by a special committee of the House of Councillors on July 16 and passed by the full House of Councillors on July 17, completing its enactment.

The amendments allow naishinnō (imperial princesses) and joō (princesses) to retain their membership of the imperial family after marrying commoners, instead of automatically losing imperial status. They also permit members of the imperial family, with the approval of the Imperial Household Council, to adopt eligible male-line male descendants of former imperial family members who are at least 15 years old and have neither a spouse nor children. A man who enters the imperial family through such an adoption is expressly excluded from the line of succession, although his descendants retain their status according to their biological male-line descent. The government stated during deliberations that a son subsequently born to such an adopted male would be eligible to succeed under the existing provisions of Articles 1 and 2 of the Imperial Household Law.

The revised law was promulgated on July 24, 2026, as Law No. 66 of 2026, and is scheduled to take effect on October 24, three months after promulgation. It was the first amendment involving substantive changes to the main provisions of the current Imperial Household Law since its enactment in 1947.

=== Public opinion ===
The results of various polls and surveys in recent years have shown consistent high levels of support for reigning empresses. According to a 2005 poll, 85% of the Japanese support reigning empresses, 71% support matrilineal emperors and 54% support absolute primogeniture.

Polls in more recent years have shown overwhelming support, 76% in an Asahi Shimbun poll (2018), 92% in a NHK survey (2018) and 82%, 85% and 87% in Kyodo News polls from 2018, 2019, and 2021, respectively.
