= Prince Kuni Taka =

Prince Kuni Taka 久邇宮 多嘉王
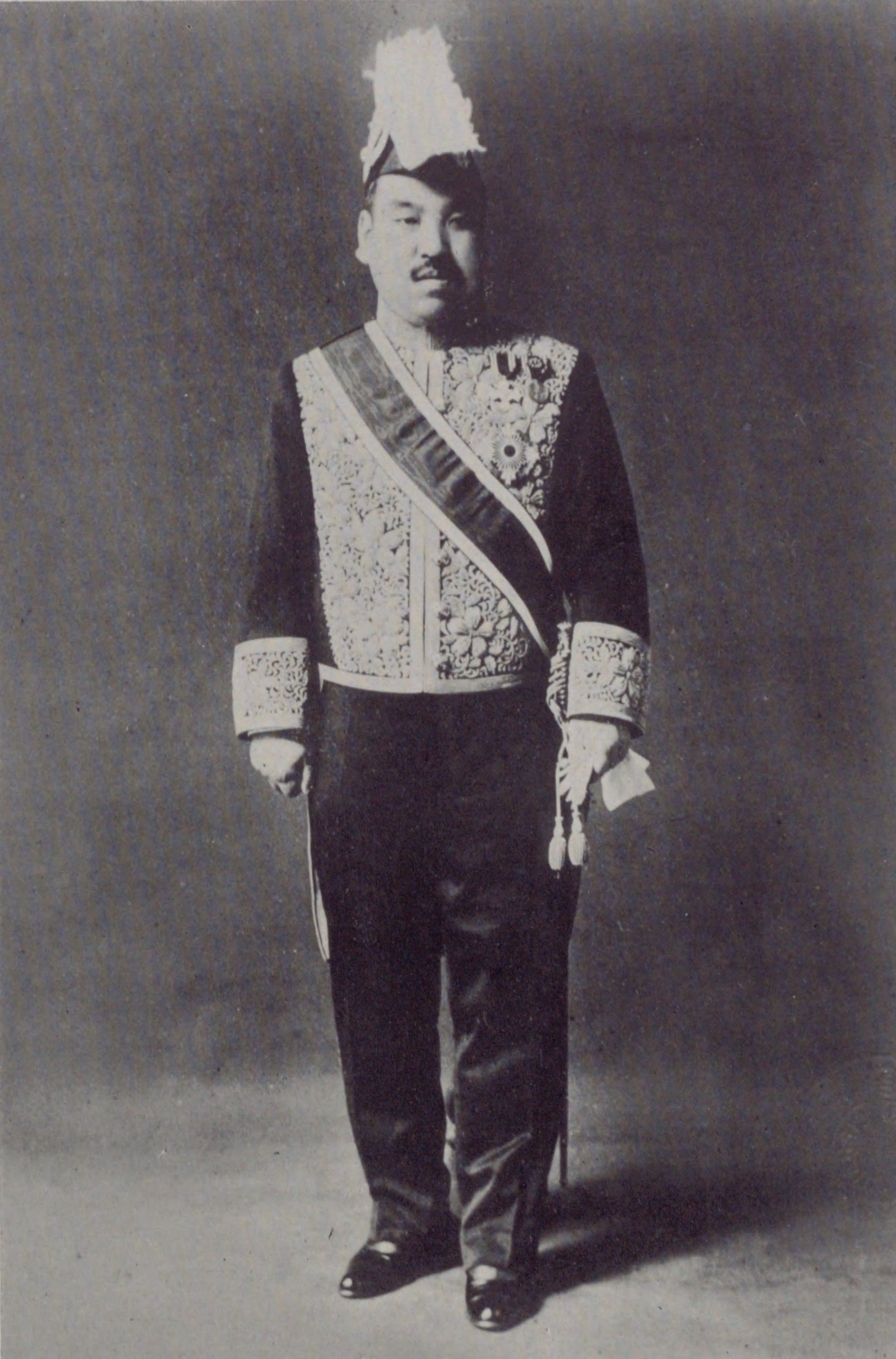
- Prince Kuni Taka in court uniform
- Born: 17 August 1875; Kyoto, Japan
- Died: 1 October 1937 (aged 62); Kyoto, Japan
- Spouse: Minase Shizuko
- Father: Prince Kuni Asahiko
- Mother: Izumitei Shizue

Prince Kuni Taka (久邇宮多嘉王, Kuni-no-miya Taka-ō; 17 August 1875 – 1 October 1937) was a member of a collateral branch of the Japanese imperial family, who served as the chief priest (saishu) of the Shinto Grand Shrine of Ise, from 1909 until his death in 1937.

== Early life ==
Prince Kuni Taka was born in Kyoto, the fifth son of Prince Kuni Asahiko, a scion of the sesshu shinōke line of Fushimi-no-miya. His mother was Izumitei Shizue, the second daughter of Isumitise Shun'eki, a priest at Kamo Shrine, Kyoto.

He was a half-brother of Prince Kaya Kuninori, Prince Kuni Kuniyoshi (the father of Empress Kōjun), Prince Nashimoto Morimasa, Prince Asaka Yasuhiko, and Prince Higashikuni Naruhiko.

Prince Taka came of age at a time when the Meiji oligarchs deemed to politically expedient to sever the historical links between Buddhism and the imperial house; use the emperor and imperial family as symbols of national unity by having them serve in the military; and increase the size of the imperial family by allowing new princely houses to branch out from the Fushimi-no-miya. Prince Taka's career path was somewhat unusual for the late Meiji period in several respects. First, unlike his half-brothers and other princes of that generation, he never held a commission in the military. Second, Emperor Meiji did not direct him to form a new princely family or to descend to peerage status with a kazoku title. Instead, he remained within the imperial family, although his half-brother, Prince Kuni Kunyoshi, succeeded to the Kuni-no-miya title in 1891. Third, while his father and half-brothers moved to the new capital, Tokyo, in 1892, Prince Taka continued to reside in Kyoto, except for a brief period in 1895, when he served a term in the House of Peers.

== Marriage & Family ==
On 9 March 1907, Prince Taka of Kuni married Minase Shizuko ( 1 September 1884 – 27 September 1959), the eldest daughter of Viscount Minase Tadasuki. The prince and princess had six children: one daughter who married, two daughters who died young, one son who died in childhood, and two other sons who left the imperial family and received peerages upon adulthood:

1. Princess Hatsuko (発子女王; 16 April 1911 – 26 June 1915).
2. Prince Yoshihiko (賀彦王; 28 May 1912 – 18 June 1918).
3. Princess Kōko (珖子女王; 5 December 1913 – 27 June 1918)
4. Princess Kuniko (恭仁子; 18 May 1917 – 6 July 2002); m. 2 April 1939 to Prince Nijō Tanemoto ( 10 June 1910 – 28 August 1985) and had issue.
5. Prince Iehiko (家彦王; 17 March 1920 - 24 October 2008); renounced imperial title and created Count Uji, 5 October 1942; m. Kazuko ( 26 June 1926 - ), third daughter of Duke Nobusuke Takatsukasa, and had issue.
6. Prince Norihiko (徳彦王; 22 November 1922 – 7 February 2007), renounced imperial title and created Count Tatsuda, 7 June 1943; adopted by Nashimoto Itsuko, the widow of former Prince Nashimoto Morimasa, 28 April 1966, and changed surname to Nashimoto; current head of the former Nashimoto-no-miya house; m. at Tokyo 1945 (div. 1979) Princess Kuni Masako ( 8 December 1926 - ), eldest daughter of Prince Kuni Asaakira; and has issue: Norihisa, Toyoko and Kayoko.

Prince Taka became acting grand custodian and chief priest of the Shrines of Ise in September 1909, due to the illness of his half brother, Prince Kuni Kuniyoshi. He assumed the post on a permanent basis following Prince Kuni Kuniyoshi's death.

== References and further reading ==
1. Keene, Donald. Emperor of Japan: Meiji and His World, 1852-1912 (New York: Columbia University Press, 2002) ISBN 0-231-12340-X
2. Lebra, Takie Sugiyama. Above the Clouds: Status Culture of the Modern Japanese Nobility (Berkeley: University of California Press, 1993) ISBN 0-520-07602-8
