= Prince Nashimoto Morimasa =

Morimasa
- Prince Nashimoto
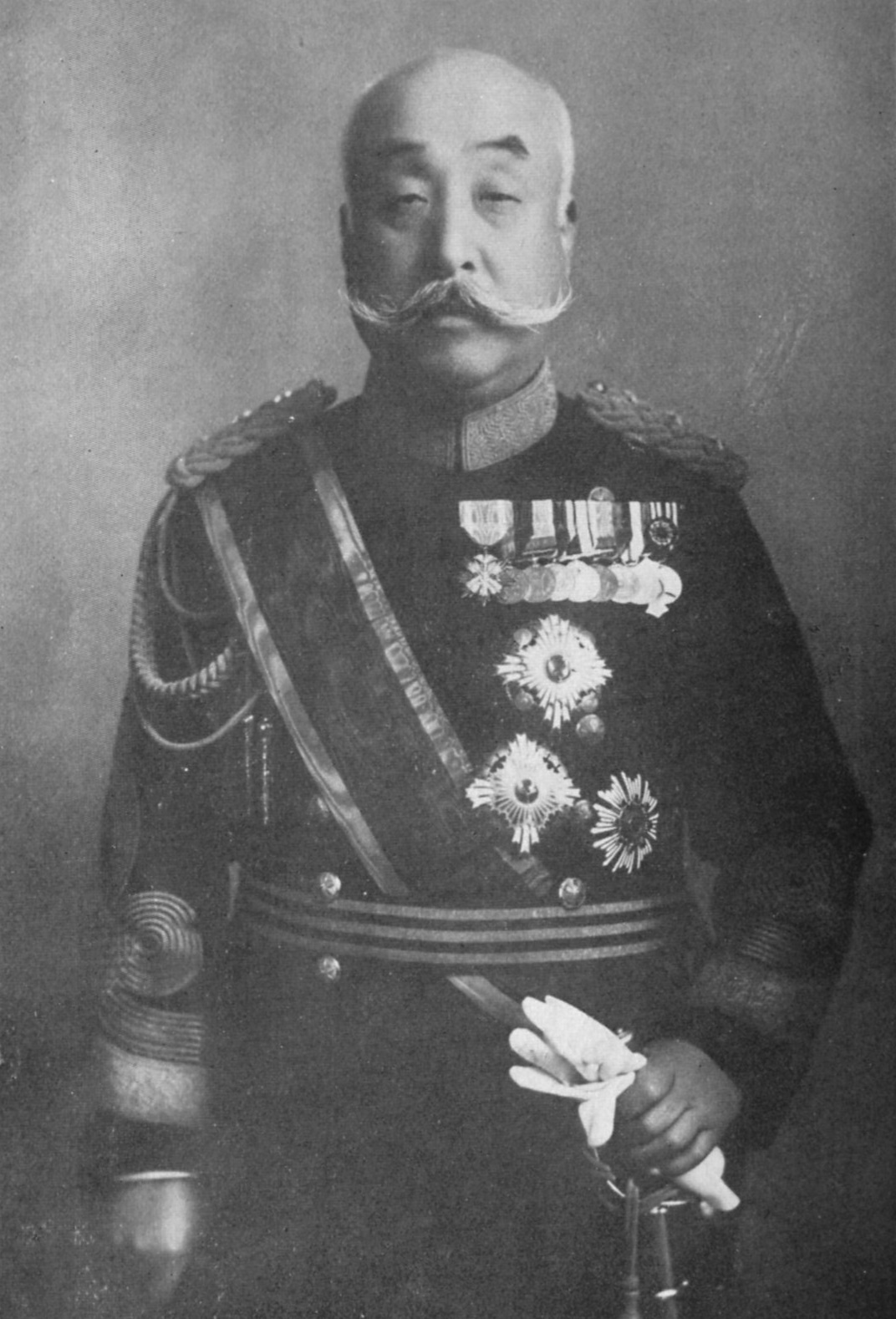
- Prince Nashimoto Morimasa, 1935

Prince Nashimoto
- Reign: 2 December 1885 – 14 October 1947

Head of Nashimoto-no-miya
- Reign: 2 December 1885 – 2 January 1951
- Born: 9 March 1874; Kyoto, Japan
- Died: 2 January 1951 (aged 76); Shibuya-ku, Tokyo, Japan
- Spouse: Itsuko Nashimoto (m. 1897)
- Issue: Yi Bangja (Ri Masako), Crown Princess of Korea; Hirohashi Noriko
- Father: Prince Kuni Asahiko
- Mother: Harada Mitsue
- Military career
- Allegiance: Japan
- Branch: Imperial Japanese Army
- Service years: 1899–1944
- Rank: Field Marshal
- Commands: 1st Brigade; 16th Division
- Conflicts: Russo-Japanese War; Second Sino-Japanese War; World War II
- Awards: Supreme Order of the Chrysanthemum; Order of the Rising Sun; Order of the Golden Kite; Order of St. Stephen

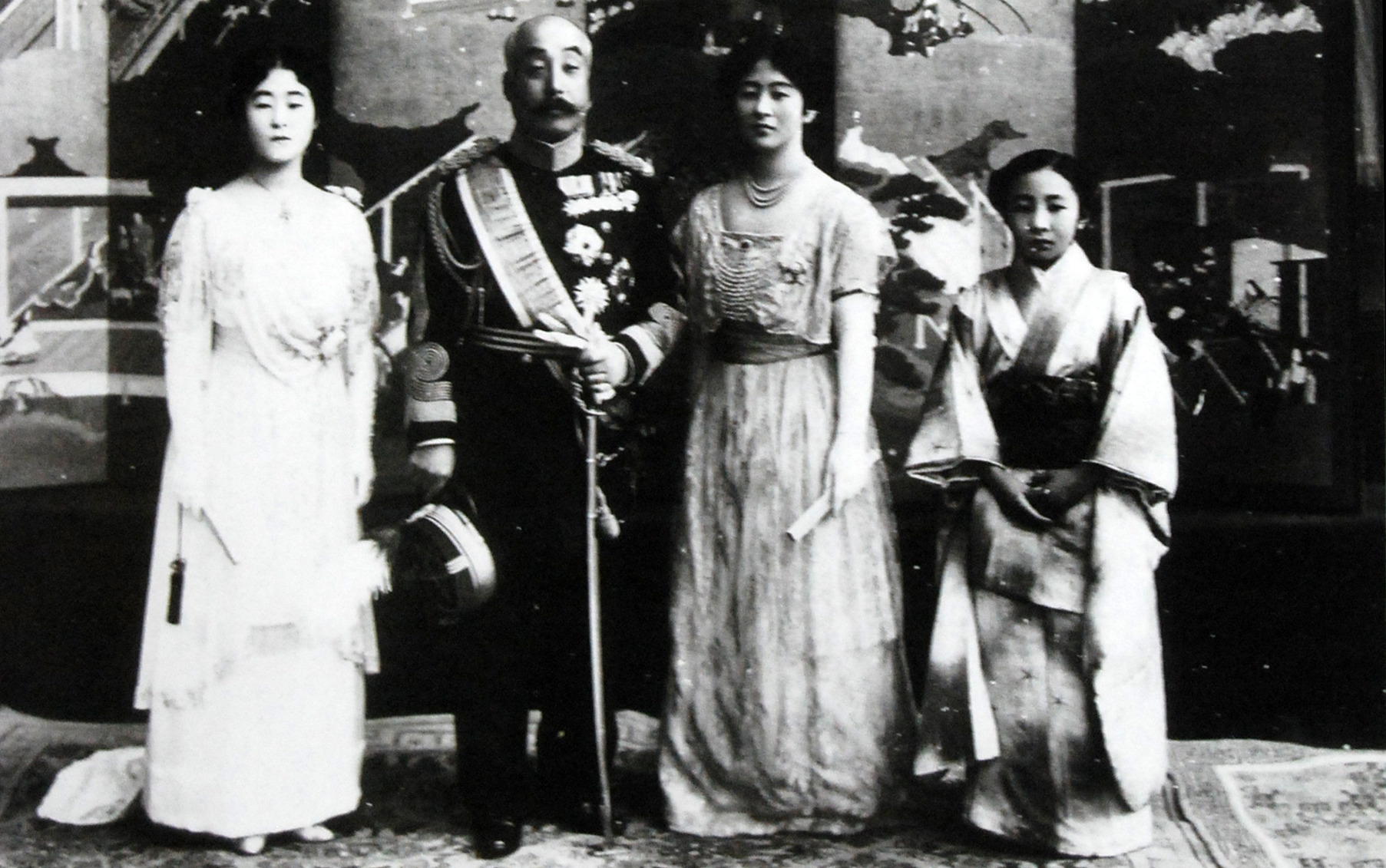
Nashimoto family in 1918

Morimasa, Prince Nashimoto (梨本宮守正王, Nashimoto no miya Morimasa ō; 9 March 1874 – 2 January 1951) was a member of the Japanese Imperial Family and a field marshal in the Imperial Japanese Army. An uncle-in-law of Hirohito (Emperor Shōwa), an uncle of his consort, Empress Kōjun, and the father-in-law of Crown Prince Euimin of Korea, Prince Nashimoto was the only member of the Imperial Family arrested for war crimes during the Allied occupation of Japan following defeat in the Second World War.

== Early life ==
Prince Nashimoto Morimasa was born in Kyoto, the fourth son of Prince Kuni Asahiko and Harada Mitsue, a court lady. His father, a prince of the blood and one-time Buddhist priest, was the head of one of the ōke collateral branches of the Imperial Family created during the early Meiji period. Originally named Prince Tada, his half-brothers included Prince Kaya Kuninori, Prince Naruhiko Higashikuni (served as prime minister in 1945), Prince Yasuhiko Asaka, Prince Kuni Taka, and Prince Kuni Kuniyoshi.

On 2 December 1885, Emperor Meiji named him successor to the Nashimoto-no-miya, another cadet branch of the imperial family. He adopted the personal name "Morimasa" the following year.

== Family ==
On 28 November 1897, Prince Nashimoto married Nabeshima Itsuko (2 February 1879 – 18 August 1977), the second daughter of Marquis Nabeshima Naohiro, a former Japanese ambassador to Italy and the son of the last feudal lord (daimyō) of Saga Domain. Itsuko was the maternal aunt of Setsuko, Princess Chichibu, Emperor Taishō's daughter-in-law.

The couple had two daughters and one adopted son.

1. Princess Nashimoto Masako (方子), (4 November 1899 – 30 April 1989). Married the half-brother and heir of Korea's last monarch, Yi Un (Crown Prince Euimin) in 1920.
2. Princess Nashimoto Noriko (規子), (27 April 1907 – 25 August 1985) married Count Hirohashi Tadamitsu in 1926.
3. Prince Norihiko, (22 November 1922 – 7 February 2007), son of Prince Kuni Taka, became Count Tatsuta Norihiko in 1943, adopted by Princess Nashimoto Itsuko to carry on Nashimoto family name on 28 April 1966. Married Princess Kuni Masako, daughter of Prince Kuni Asaakira, in 1945 but divorced her in 1980.

== Military career ==
Like the other princes of the imperial blood at the time, Prince Nashimoto Morimasa pursued a military career. Educated at the Central Military Preparatory School and the Imperial Japanese Army Academy, he received a commission as a second lieutenant in the IJA 39th Infantry Regiment in 1899. In 1903, he went to the École Spéciale Militaire de Saint-Cyr at St. Cyr, France, but returned to Japan the following year and served with his regiment as a captain under General Oku Yasukata in the Russo-Japanese War. Prince Nashimoto then returned to France in August 1906 and remained until July 1909. The Prince rose to the rank of major of the Infantry in 1906, lieutenant colonel in 1908, and colonel in 1910. He was promoted to lieutenant general and commander of the IJA 16th Division in August 1917.

Prince Nashimoto became a member of the Imperial Japanese Army General Staff Office in November 1919 and was promoted to the rank of general in August 1922. On 8 August 1932, he was given the largely honorary rank of field marshal and became a member of the Board of Marshals and Fleet Admirals. However, the prince held no major military commands during the Pacific War (1941–1945). Unlike his younger half-brothers and Emperor Meiji's sons-in-law, Prince Yasuhiko Asaka and Prince Naruhiko Higashikuni (served as prime minister in 1945), he remained largely removed from the mounting radicalism within the army, which culminated in the February 26 Incident of 1936. In October 1937, he became chief priest (saishu) of the Ise Shrine, upon the death of his half-brother, Prince Kuni Taka.

Prince Nashimoto retired from the active list aged 70 in 1944. He served as president of the Imperial Association, the honorary president of the Franco-Japanese Society, the Japan Forestry Association, the Japan Agricultural Association, the Imperial Air-Association, the Japan Martial Arts Association, and the Italian Society of Japan.

== Post war ==
On 2 December 1945, General Douglas MacArthur, the military governor of Japan during the American occupation, ordered the arrest of Prince Nashimoto as a "class A" war criminal, largely for his role in supporting State Shintoism (Prince Nashimoto was the chief priest of the Grand Shrine of Ise from 1937 until 1947). Prince Nashimoto was also the second most senior member of the Imperial Family (after Prince Kan'in Kotohito) during World War II.

The prince's arrest caused great consternation among the Japanese, as it opened the possibility that Emperor Shōwa and more senior members of the imperial household might also face prosecution for war crimes. Few people on either side regarded Prince Nashimoto as more than a symbol, but he was regarded more as a hostage to ensure Emperor Shōwa's compliance with American-directed political reforms. After four months' imprisonment in Tokyo's Sugamo Prison, American authorities released him without charges on 13 April 1946. By action of the reconstituted Imperial Household Council, Prince and Princess Nashimoto were divested of their imperial status and became commoners on 14 October 1947.

However, unlike other former members of the Japanese imperial family, the American Occupation authorities (SCAP) purged former Prince Nashimoto allegedly because of his military career, denying him any compensation for the loss of his title and properties. American bombing raids had already destroyed his Tokyo residence, and he was forced to sell his country villa to pay taxes. He spent his last years in poverty, unlike many other former nobles with more extensive war records.

The former prince died of a heart attack on 2 January 1951 at the age of 76. His widow, former Princess Nashimoto Itsuko, maintained close ties to the Imperial Household until her death in August 1976. She published her memoirs under the title Nashimoto-no-miya Itsuko-ohi Nikki (The Memoirs of Princess Nashimoto Itsuko) in 1972.

== Honours ==
- Qing dynasty: Order of the Double Dragon, Class I Grade II, 20 May 1903
- United Kingdom: Honorary Grand Cross of the Royal Victorian Order, 7 June 1909
- France: Grand Cross of the Legion of Honour, 22 July 1908
- Spain: Grand Cross of the Order of Charles III, July 1909
- Austria-Hungary: Grand Cross of the Order of St. Stephen, 1909
