= Prince Kaya Tsunenori =

Japanese politician (1900–1978)

HIH Prince Kaya Tsunenori
- 賀陽宮恒憲王
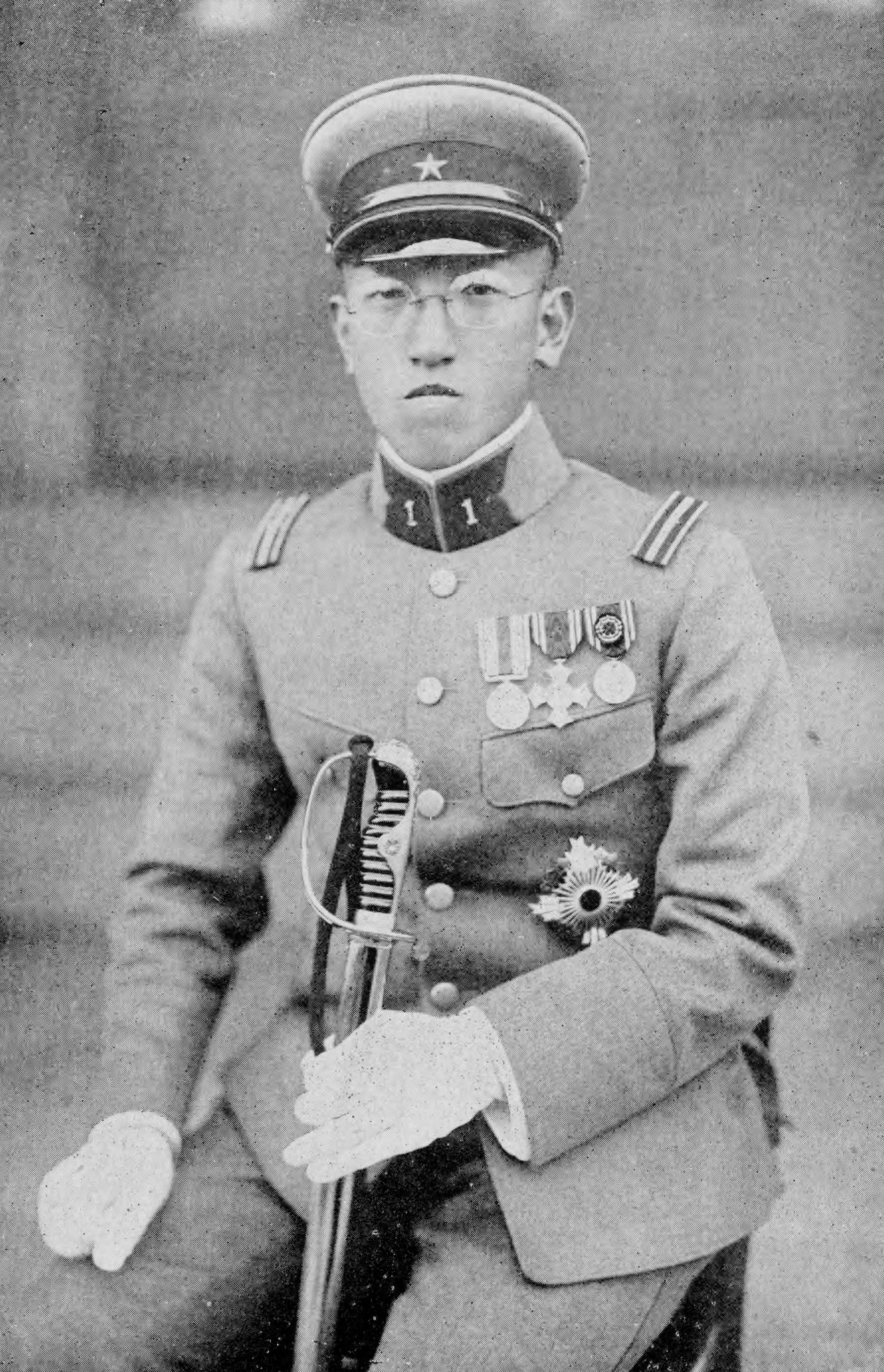
- Prince Kaya Tsunenori as major
- Born: 23 July 1900; Kyoto, Japan
- Died: 3 January 1978 (aged 77); Kashiwa, Chiba, Japan
- Military career
- Allegiance: Empire of Japan
- Branch: Imperial Japanese Army
- Service years: 1920–1945
- Rank: Lieutenant General
- Conflicts: Second Sino-Japanese War; World War II

Member of the House of Peers
- In office 27 January 1920 – 23 May 1946 Hereditary peerage

Prince Kaya Tsunenori (賀陽宮恒憲王, Kaya no miya Tsunenori ō; 23 July 1900 – 3 January 1978), was the second head of the Kaya-no-miya collateral branch of the Japanese imperial family. A general in the Imperial Japanese Army, he was first cousin to Empress Kōjun (Nagako), the wife of Emperor Shōwa (Hirohito).

== Early life ==
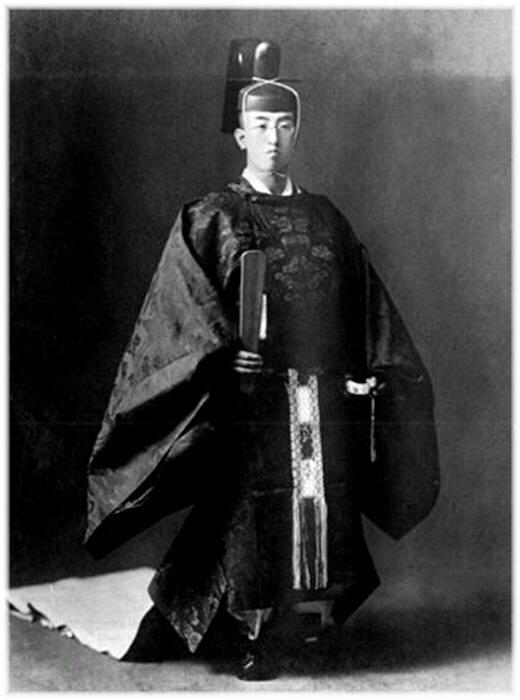
Prince Kaya wearing a Sokutai

Prince Kaya Tsunenori was born in Tokyo, the first son of Prince Kaya Kuninori and his wife, the former Daigō Yoshiko. He received his primary and secondary education at the boys' department of the Gakushuin Peers’ School. On 8 December 1909, he became the second head of the Kaya-no-miya house upon his father's death.

== Military career ==
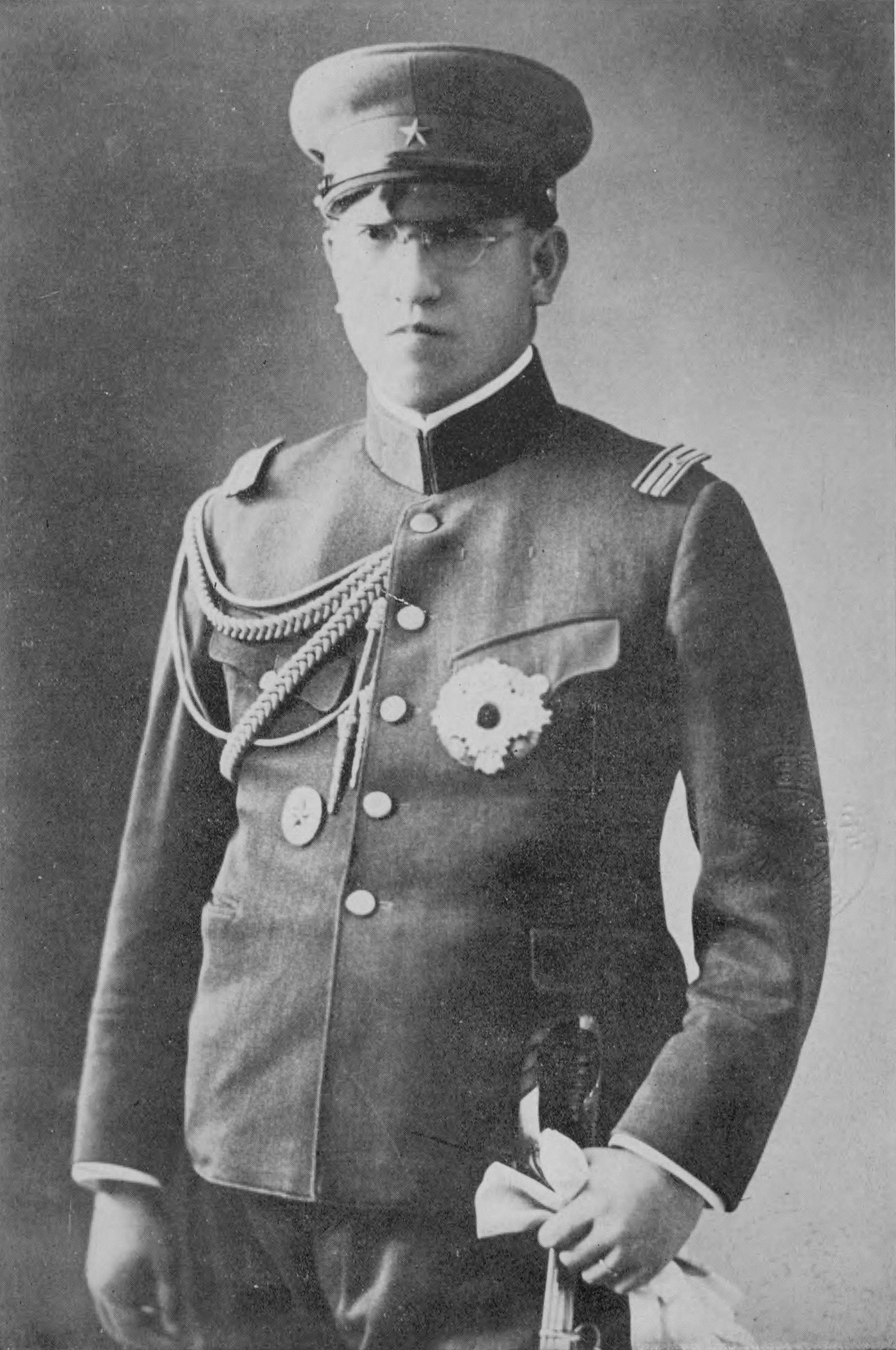
Prince Kaya as a major in the Imperial Japanese Army

Like the other imperial princes of his generation, Prince Kaya was a career military officer. In 1920, after serving a term in the House of Peers, he graduated from the 32nd class of the Imperial Japanese Army Academy and received a commission as a lieutenant (2nd class) in the cavalry. In August 1925, he became commander of the Tenth Cavalry Regiment (at the rank of captain) and graduated from the 38th class of Army Staff College. The following year, he rose to the rank of major in the cavalry, and was appointed an instructor at the Army Staff College the following year. He joined the Imperial Japanese Army General Staff in 1933 and was promoted to colonel two years later.

Prince and Princess Kaya undertook a seven-month world tour in 1934, visiting the United States, Great Britain, France, and Germany. The tour received extensive press coverage at the time.

After his return to Japan, he replaced his uncle, Prince Asaka Yasuhiko, as the emperor's personal envoy to Nanking, the occupied capital of Nationalist China, following the Nanjing Massacre in January 1938. He was promoted to major general in 1940 and lieutenant general in 1943 in command of the IJA 43rd Division. Prince Kaya became commander of the Third Imperial Guard Division in 1944 and briefly served as president of the Army Staff College during the closing stages of World War II.

== Commoner life ==
After 14 October 1947, Prince Kaya Tsunenori and his family were divested of their imperial status and become commoners due to the American occupation authorities' reform of the Japanese imperial household. Barred from holding public office because of his military career, the former prince received a lump payment from the reconstituted Imperial Household Council in order to "maintain his dignity." The former prince later served on the boards of directors of the Taishō Life Insurance Company and Nissan Mutual Life Insurance Company. He served as the honorary president of the International Martial Arts Federation from its founding in 1953 until 1965. The former prince was a noted fan and supporter of Japanese baseball. In 1970, he founded a retirement home in Nagano Prefecture.

The former prince died of a heart ailment on 2 January 1978, at his home in Kashiwa, Chiba Prefecture.

The former Kaya-no-miya palace is now the site of the Chidorigafuchi National Cemetery in downtown Tokyo.

== Marriage and family ==
On 3 May 1921, Prince Kaya married Kujō Toshiko (16 May 1903 – 23 March 1993), the third daughter of Prince Kujō Michizane, head of one of the Five regent houses of the Fujiwara clan. His wife was also a niece of Empress Teimei, the consort of the Emperor Taishō. The couple had seven children:

1. Prince Kaya Kuninaga (賀陽宮邦寿王), (21 April 1922 – 19 April 1986)
2. Princess Kaya Michiko (美智子女王) (29 July 1923 – 21 April 2009)
3. Prince Kaya Harunori (治憲王), (3 July 1926 – 5 June 2011)
4. Prince Kaya Akinori (章憲王), (17 August 1929 – 4 November 1994)
5. Prince Kaya Fuminori (文憲王), (12 July 1931 – 16 February 2021)
6. Prince Kaya Munenori (宗憲王), (24 November 1935 – 23 December 2017)
7. Prince Kaya Takenori (健憲王), (5 August 1942 – 20 July 2017)

== Gallery ==
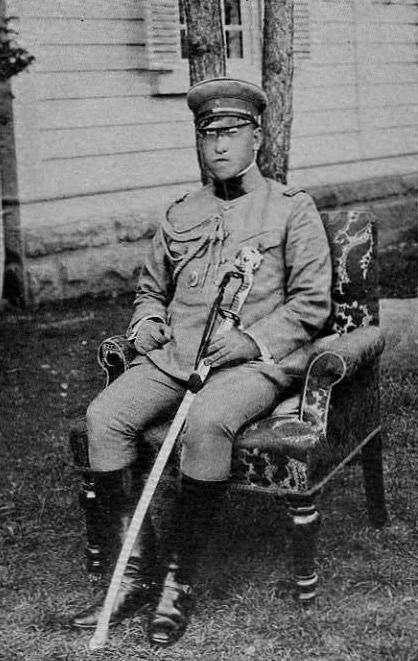
Prince Kaya Tsunenori, c. 1920s

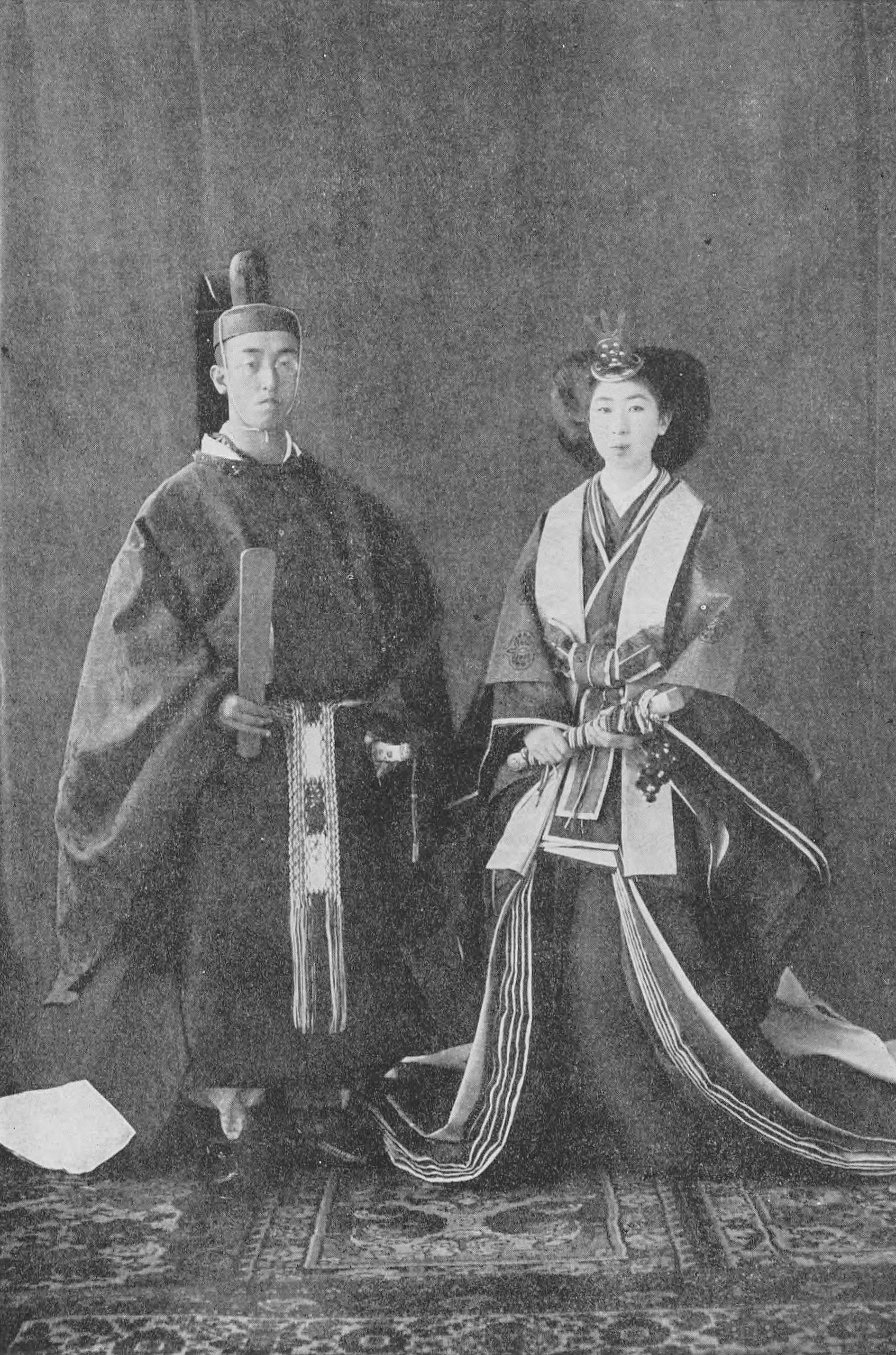
Official wedding photo of Prince Kaya Tsunenori and Princess Consort Toshiko, 1921

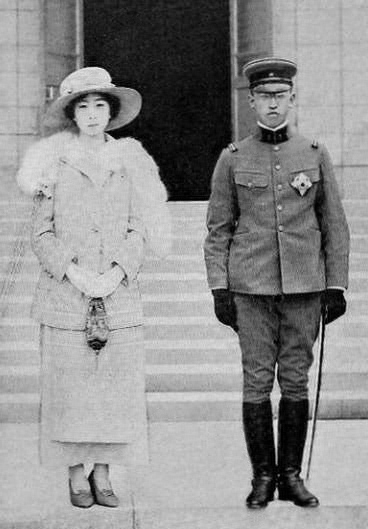
The Prince and Princess Kaya, c. early 1920s

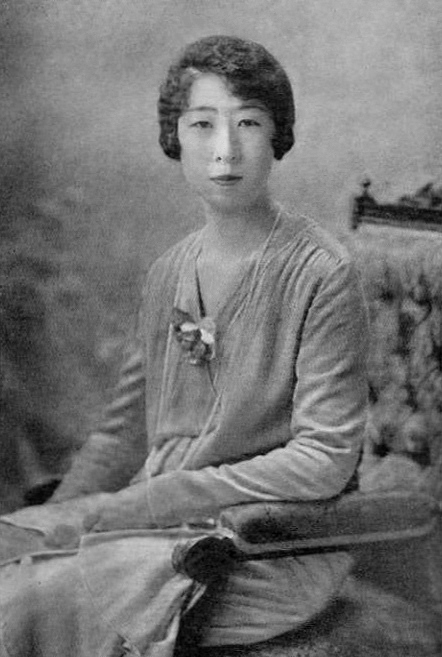
Princess Consort Toshiko, c. late 1920s

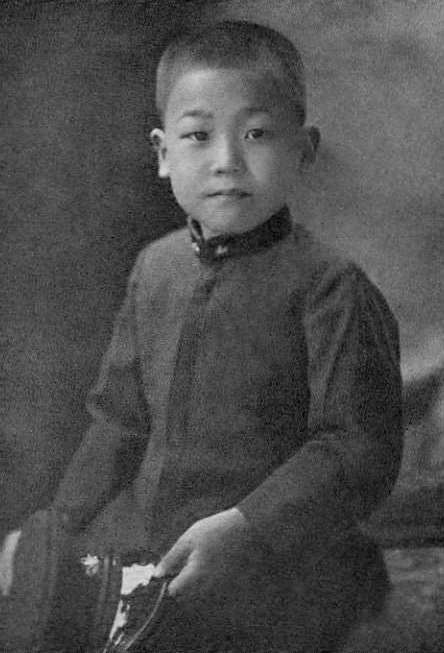
Their first son, Prince Kaya Kuninaga, c. late 1920s

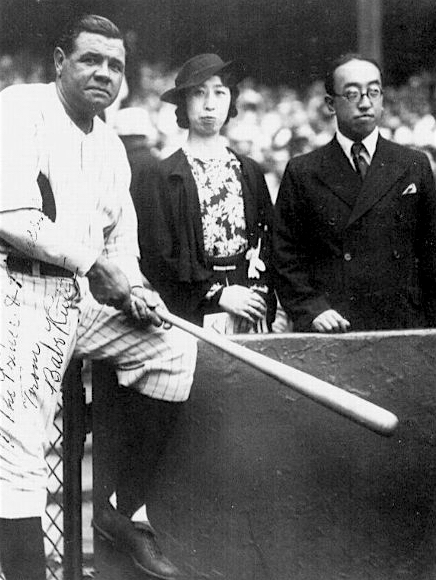
The Prince and Princess Kaya at a photo op with Babe Ruth at Yankee Stadium during their world tour in 1934
