= Prince Kuni Kuniyoshi =

Member of the Japanese Imperial Family and Field Marshal in the Imperial Japanese Army

Kuniyoshi
- Prince Kuni
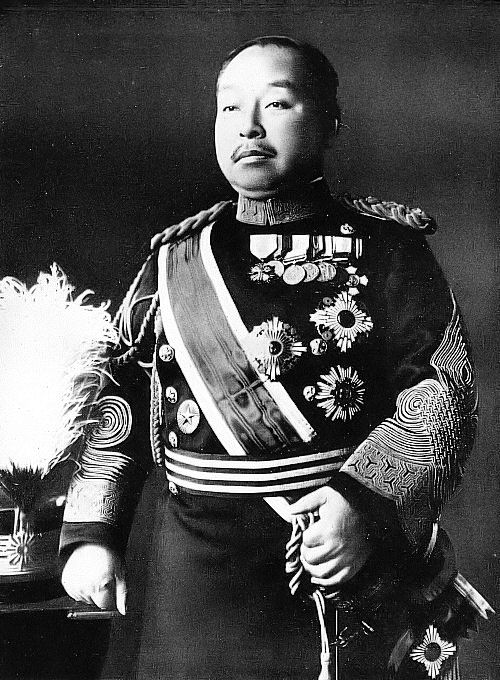

Prince Kuni
- Reign: 29 October 1891 – 27 January 1929
- Predecessor: Prince Kuni Asahiko
- Successor: Prince Kuni Asaakira
- Born: 23 July 1873; Shimogamo, Kyoto, Japan
- Died: 27 January 1929 (aged 55); Atami, Shizuoka, Japan
- Spouse: Shimazu Chikako (m. 1899)
- Issue: Prince Kuni Asaakira; Marquis Kuni Kunihisa; Empress Nagako; Countess Nobuko Sanjōnishi; Satoko Ōtani; Higashifushimi Kunihide
- Military career
- Allegiance: Empire of Japan
- Branch: Imperial Japanese Army
- Service years: 1897–1929
- Rank: Field Marshal
- Conflicts: Russo-Japanese War
- Awards: Order of the Golden Kite (4th class); Grand Cordon of the Supreme Order of the Chrysanthemum; Grand Cordon of the Order of the Rising Sun

Kuniyoshi, Prince Kuni (久邇宮邦彦王, Kuni-no-miya Kuniyoshi ō; 23 July 1873 – 27 January 1929) was a member of the Japanese imperial family and a field marshal in the Imperial Japanese Army during the Meiji and Taishō periods. He was the father of Empress Kōjun (who in turn was the consort of the Emperor Shōwa), and therefore, the maternal grandfather of Emperor Emeritus Akihito and great-grandfather of Emperor Naruhito.

== Biography ==
=== Early life ===
Prince Kuni Kuniyoshi was born in Kyoto, the third son of Prince Kuni Asahiko (Kuni-no-miya Asahiko Shinnō) and the court lady Isume Makiko. His father, Prince Asahiko (also known as Shōren-no-miya Sun'yu and Nagakawa-no-miya Asahiko), was a son of Prince Fushimi Kuniye (Fushimi-no-miya Kuniie Shinnō), the head of one of the ōke branch houses of the imperial dynasty entitled to provide a successor to the throne of Japan. In 1872, Emperor Meiji granted Prince Asahiko the title "Kuni-no-miya" and authorized him to begin a new branch of the imperial family.

Prince Kuniyoshi succeeded to the title upon his father's death on 29 October 1891. His half-brothers, Prince Asaka Yasuhiko, Prince Higashikuni Naruhiko, Prince Nashimoto Morimasa, and Prince Kaya Kuninori, all formed new branches of the imperial family during the Meiji period.

=== Military career ===
Prince Kuni Kuniyoshi graduated from the 7th class of the Imperial Japanese Army Academy in 1897 as a second lieutenant, and was promoted to lieutenant in February 1899 and to captain in March 1901. Promoted to major in the infantry in November 1904, during the Russo-Japanese War he was assigned to the staff of General Kuroki Tamemoto, commander of the IJA 1st Army. For his war services he was awarded the Order of the Golden Kite (4th class). He then graduated from the Army War College and was assigned to the 3rd Regiment of the Imperial Guards Division.

From 1907 to 1910, he studied military tactics in Germany and was attached to the Second Regiment of the Prussian Foot Guards. He was promoted to lieutenant colonel in April 1908 and to colonel in December 1910. Upon returning to Japan, Prince Kuni rose to the rank of major general in August 1913 and was given command of the 38th Infantry Regiment. Later he commanded the Imperial Guard of Japan and rose to the rank of lieutenant general in August 1917 and commander of the IJA 15th Division. Along with that command, he received the additional post of chief priest of Meiji Shrine.

Prince Kuni became a full general and a member of the Imperial Japanese Army General Staff in August 1923. An early advocate of military aviation, one of his protégés was Yamamoto Isoroku, the future admiral and commander-in-chief of the Imperial Japanese Navy. On 27 January 1929 (the day of his death), Emperor Hirohito promoted him to the honorary rank of field marshal and granted him the Grand Cordon of the Supreme Order of the Chrysanthemum.

He was the target of a failed assassination attempt by Cho Myeongha in Taichung.

Prince Kuni's death occurred soon after he arrived at his villa at Atami, of an acute onset of an undisclosed disease.

== Honours ==
He received the following orders and decorations:

- Empire of Japan:
  - Grand Cordon of the Order of the Rising Sun, with Paulownia Flowers, November 1893
  - Grand Cordon of the Order of the Chrysanthemum, November 1903; Collar, 27 January 1929
  - Order of the Golden Kite, 4th Class, April 1906
- United Kingdom: Honorary Grand Cross of the Royal Victorian Order, 21 July 1909
- Spain: Grand Cross with collar of the Order of Charles III, 16 March 1908
- German Empire: Knight of the Order of the Black Eagle, 15 October 1908
  - Bavaria: Knight of the Order of St. Hubert, 12 January 1909
- Kingdom of Italy: Knight of the Order of the Annunciation, 10 February 1909
- Austria-Hungary: Grand Cross of the Order of St. Stephen, 20 February 1909
- Kingdom of Serbia: Grand Cross of the Royal Order of the White Eagle, 4 March 1909
- Kingdom of Bulgaria: Grand Cross of the Order of St. Alexander, 6 March 1909
- Ottoman Empire: Order of Osmanieh, 1st Class, 11 March 1909
- Kingdom of Romania: Grand Cross of the Order of Carol I, 28 March 1909
- Russian Empire: Knight of the Order of St. Andrew, 14 April 1909
- France: Grand Cross of the Legion of Honour, 12 June 1909
- Belgium: Grand Cordon of the Royal Order of Leopold, with Swords, 22 June 1909
- Netherlands: Grand Cross of the Order of the Netherlands Lion, 25 June 1909

== Marriage and family ==
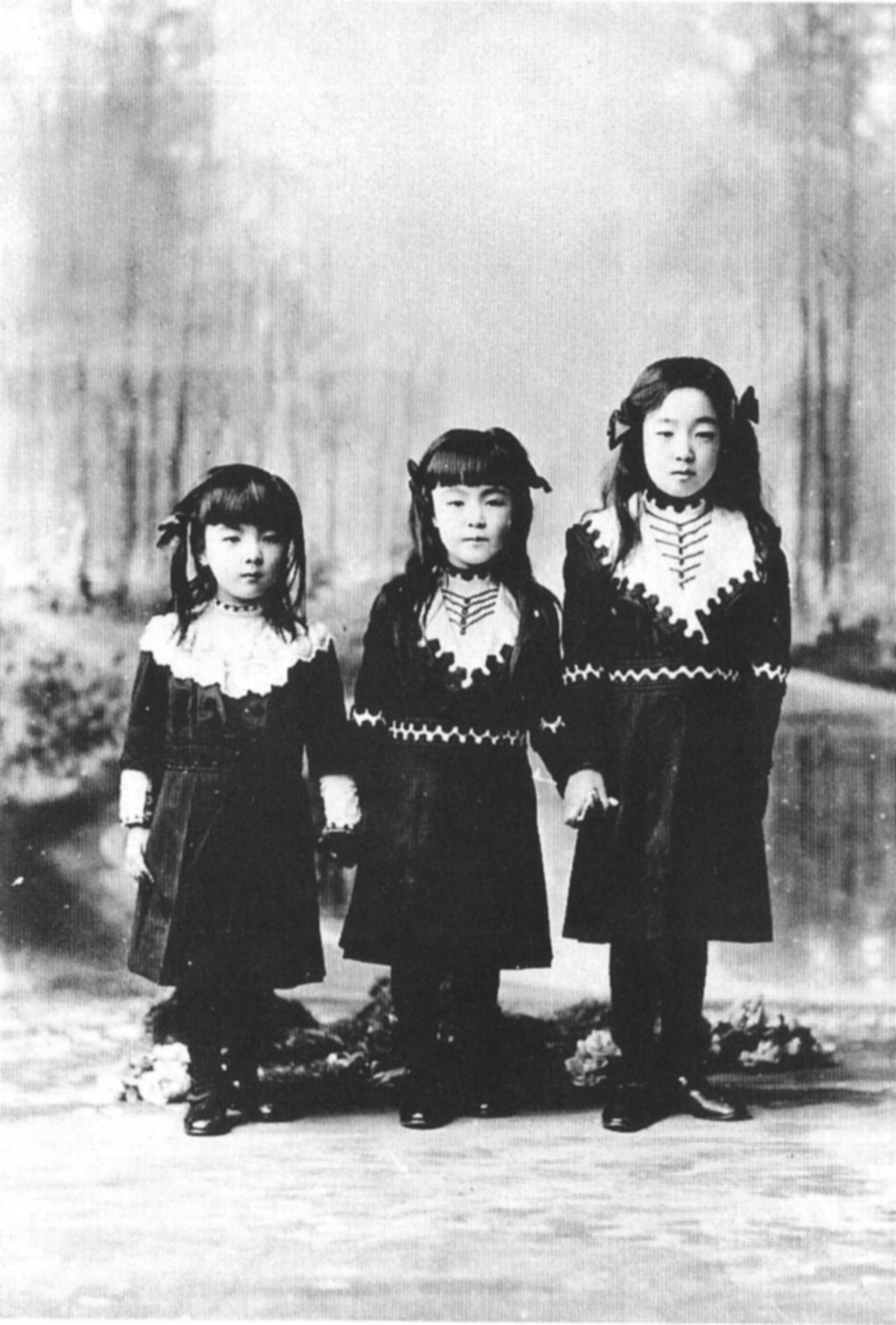
From left to right: Princess Satoko, Princess Nobuko, and Princess Nagako (later Empress Kōjun), in 1912

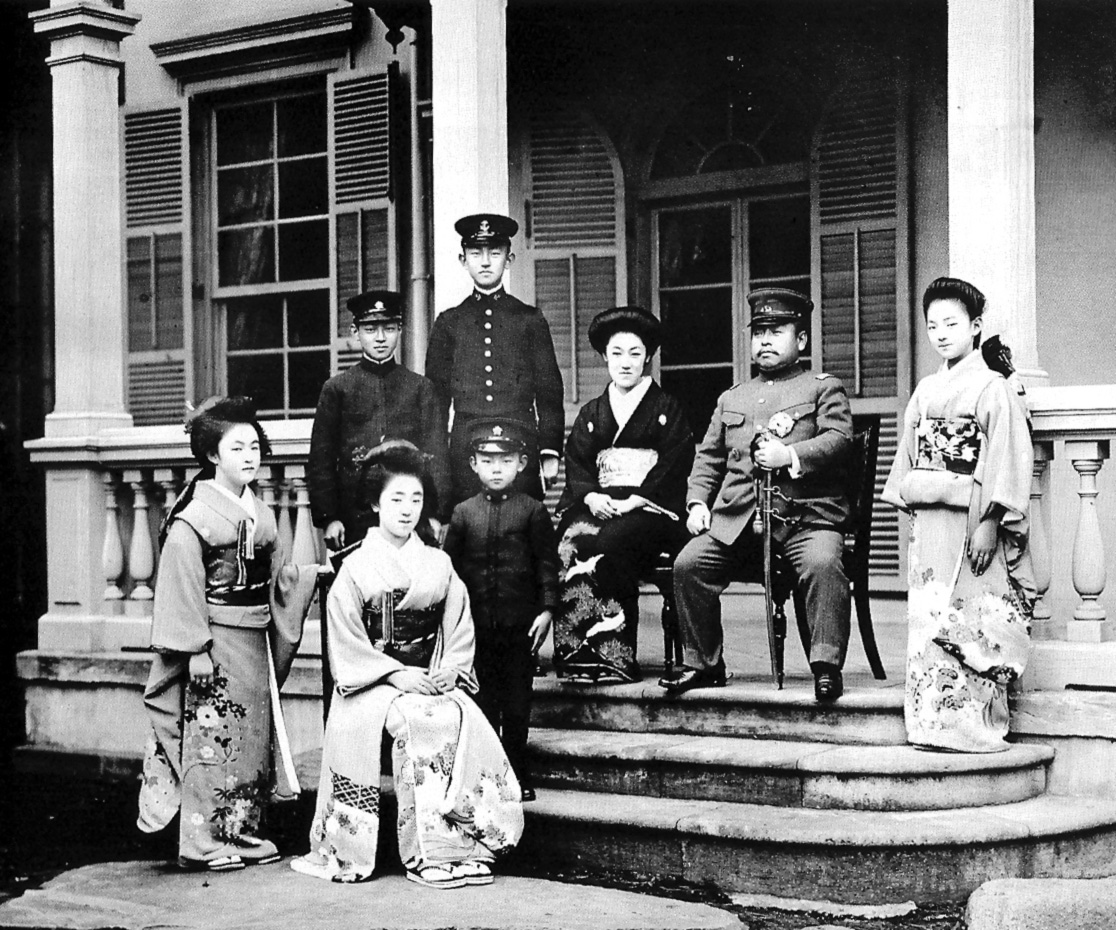
1920, Prince Kuni and his family

On 13 December 1889, Prince Kuni Kuniyoshi married Shimazu Chikako (19 October 1879 – 9 September 1956), the seventh daughter of Prince Shimazu Tadayoshi, the last daimyō of Satsuma Domain. The marriage represented an alliance between the imperial family and the Satsuma clan.

1. Prince Kuni Asaakira (久邇宮朝融王; 2 February 1901 – 3 December 1959)
2. Marquis Kuni Kunihisa (久邇邦久; 20 March 1902 – 5 March 1935)
3. Princess Kuni Nagako (香淳皇后/良子女王; 6 March 1903 – 16 June 2000): married Crown Prince Hirohito (the future Emperor Shōwa) in 1924.
4. Princess Kuni Nobuko (信子女王; 30 March 1904 – 8 November 1945): married Count Kin'osa Sanjōnishi in 1924.
5. Princess Kuni Satoko (智子女王; 1 September 1906 – 15 November 1989): married in Count Kōchō Ōtani in 1924.
6. Count Higashifushimi Kunihide (東伏見慈洽; 10 May 1910 – 1 January 2014)
