= Prince Kuni Asahiko =

Japanese prince (1824–1891)

Asahiko
- Prince Kuni
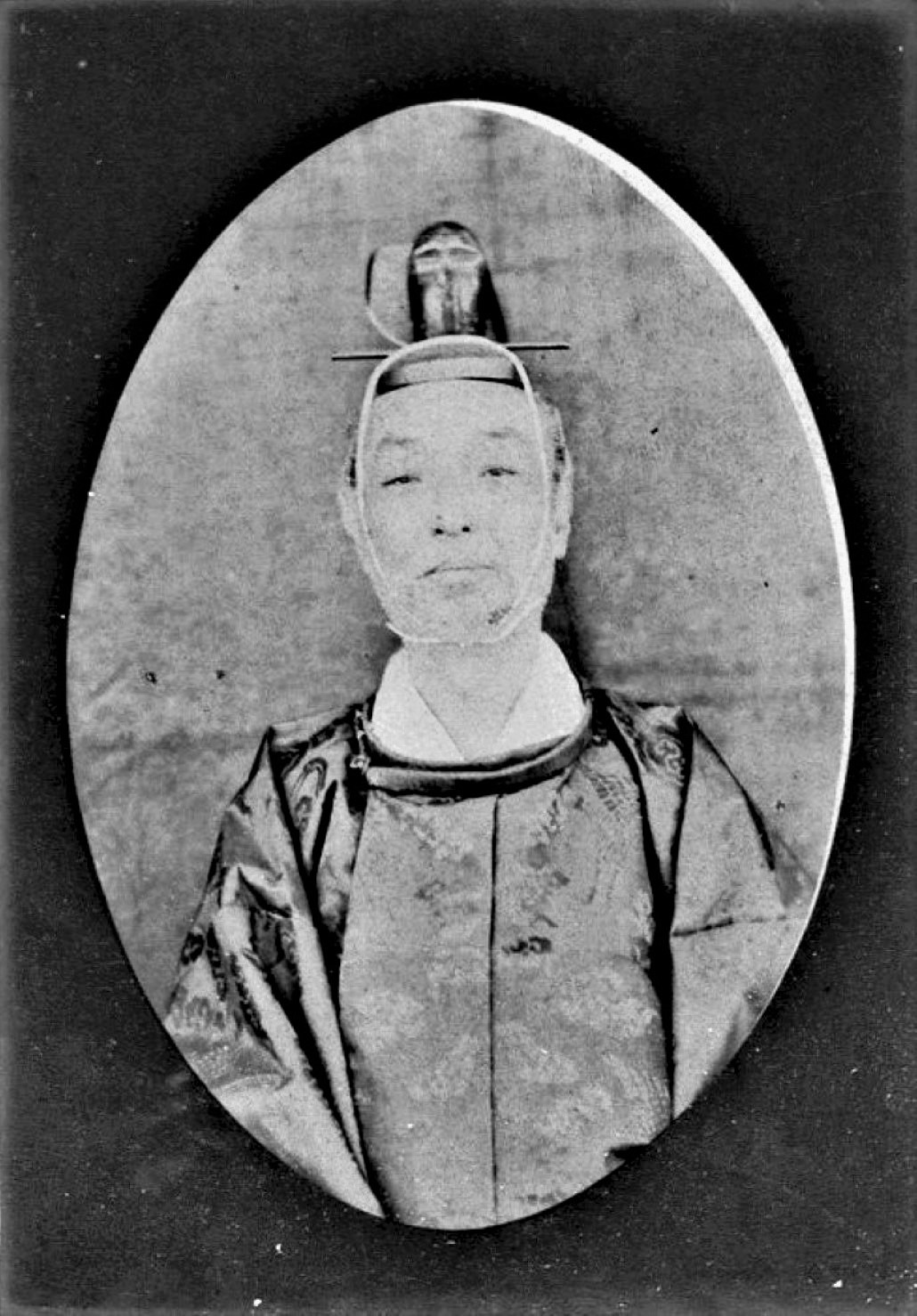

Prince Kuni
- Reign: 20 May 1875 – 25 October 1891
- Successor: Prince Kuni Kuniyoshi
- Born: 27 February 1824; Kyoto, Japan
- Died: 25 October 1891 (aged 67); Ise, Mie, Japan
- Spouse: Izumitei Shizue; Izumi Makiko; Harada Mitsue; Tarao Utako; Tsunoda Sugako
- Issue: Prince Kaya Kuninori; Prince Kuni Kuniyoshi; Prince Nashimoto Morimasa; Prince Kuni Taka; Prince Yasuhiko Asaka; Prince Naruhiko Higashikuni
- Father: Prince Fushimi Kuniie
- Mother: Torikoji Nobuko

Asahiko, Prince Kuni (久邇宮 朝彦親王, Kuni-no-miya Asahiko shinnō; 27 February 1824 – 25 October 1891) was a member of a collateral line of the Japanese imperial family who played a key role in the Meiji Restoration. Prince Asahiko was an adopted son of Emperor Ninkō and later a close advisor to Emperor Kōmei and Emperor Meiji. He was the great-great-grandfather of the present Emperor of Japan, Naruhito.

== Early life ==
Prince Asahiko was born in Kyoto, the fourth son of Prince Fushimi Kuniye, the twentieth head of the Fushimi-no-miya, the oldest of the four branches of the imperial dynasty allowed to provide a successor to the Chrysanthemum Throne should the main imperial house fail to produce an heir.

The future Prince Asahiko had several childhood appellations and acquired several more titles and names over the years. He was often known as Prince Asahiko (Asahiko Shinnō) and Prince Nakagawa (Nakagawa-no-miya).

He was a half-brother of Prince Yamashina Akira, Prince Higashifushimi Yorihito, Prince Kitashirakawa Yoshihisa, Prince Fushimi Sadanaru, and Prince Kan'in Kotohito.

== Buddhist priest ==
From an early age, Prince Asahiko was groomed to pursue a career as a Buddhist priest, the traditional career path for non-heir sons in the sesshu shinnōke during the Edo period. He was sent as an acolyte to Honnō-ji in 1831, but was transferred to Ichijō-in, an abbacy of Kōfuku-ji in Nara in 1836. In 1838, he was adopted by Emperor Ninkō. That same year, he succeeded an uncle as the abbot of Kōfuku-ji and formally entered the priesthood under the title Sonya Hoshinnō. In 1852, Emperor Kōmei transferred him to Shōren-in, a major monzeki temple of the Tendai sect in Kyoto and he assumed the title Shōren no miya Son'yu.

Asahiko was also known as Awata no miya or Awataguchi no miya after the location of that temple. During this period, the prince became an outspoken advocate of jōi , the expulsion of all foreigners from Japan. His popularity among the Ishin Shishi (the pro-imperial court nationalist patriots) attracted the attention of Ii Naosuke, daimyō of Hikone and the Tairō during the final illness of Shōgun Tokugawa Iesada. When Ii launched the Ansei Purge, the prince was condemned to perpetual confinement at Shōkoku-ji and spent more than two years living in a tiny, dilapidated hut. This disrespectful treatment of the prince enraged the shishi, who made his release one of their principal objectives.

== Meiji Restoration and afterwards ==
In 1862, the prince was allowed to return to secular status and received the title Nakagawa no miya. This was part of the amnesty declared in honor of the marriage of Shōgun Tokugawa Iemochi, to Kazu-no-miya, the Emperor Kōmei's half-sister. He returned to Kyoto, became a close advisor of the emperor, and became known by yet another title, Kaya-no-miya at this time. In September 1863, Kōmei bestowed on him the name "Asahiko" and the status of a prince of the blood (shinnō – imperial prince of shinnōke), and named him Danjō no in, a high ranking court position open only to princes of the blood. Prince Asahiko continued in this post following the death of Kōmei and the ascension of the Meiji emperor.

After the Meiji Restoration, Prince Asahiko's political enemies did not relent. In 1868, he was deprived of his status as a prince of the blood and exiled to Hiroshima on trumped-up charges of plotting to overthrow the new government. Emperor Meiji pardoned him in February 1872, restoring his princely status and allowing him to start a new collateral branch of the imperial dynasty, the Kuni-no-miya. He spent the last two decades of his life as the lord custodian priest (saishu) of the Shinto Grand Shrine of Ise. Prince Kuni Asahiko died in Ise in 1891.

Three of Prince Asahiko's sons, Prince Kaya Kuninori, Prince Kuni Taka, and Prince Nashimoto Morimasa, successively served as lord custodian priests of the Ise Shrine between 1891 and 1947. Prince Asahiko's son Prince Kuni Kuniyoshi was the father of Princess Nagako of Kuni, who married the future Emperor Shōwa.

== Family ==
Prince Kuni Asahiko was the father of at least eighteen children (nine sons and nine daughters) by at least five different court ladies: (1) Izumitei Shizue, second daughter of Izumitei Shun'eki, a priest at Kamo Shrine, Kyoto, (2) Izumi Makiko, (3) Harada Mitsue, (4) Tarao Utako, and (5) Tsunoda Sugako.

Emperor Meiji directed Prince Asahiko's second, eighth, and ninth sons to found new collateral branches of the imperial family with the hereditary rank of a minor prince of the blood (ōke): Kaya-no-miya, Asaka-no-miya, and Higashikuni-no-miya. Prince Asakiko's seventh son succeeded to the head of the existing Nashimoto-no-miya house. His fourth born son succeeded him as the second head of the Kuni-no-miya.

Consort and issue(s):

- Wife (Nyōbō): Izumitei Shizue (泉亭静枝), second daughter of Izumitei Shun'eki (泉亭俊益)
  - First Daughter: Princess Chita (智當宮, 10 April 1864 – 14 September 1866)
  - First Son: Prince Muchimaro (武智宮, 25 March 1865 – 10 January 1866)
  - Second Son: Prince Kaya Kuninori (賀陽宮邦憲王, 1 September 1867 – 8 December 1909)
  - Fifth Son: Prince Kuni Taka (久邇宮多嘉王, 17 August 1875 – 1 October 1937)
  - Sixth Son: Prince Nobu (暢王, 28 December 1876 – 7 August 1877)
- Wife (Nyōbō): Izumi Makiko (泉萬喜子), younger sister of Izumitei Shizue
  - Second Daughter: Princess Sakako (栄子女王), (18 February 1868 – 9 January 1949), Wife of Viscount Higashizono Motonaru
  - Third Daughter: Princess Akiko (安喜子女王, 6 July 1870 – 19 January 1920), Wife of Marquis Ikeda Norimasa
  - Fourth Daughter: Princess Hiroko (飛子女王, 1871 – 1889)
  - Fifth Daughter: Princess Ayako (絢子女王, 31 May 1872 – 26 July 1946), Wife of Viscount Takenuchi Koritada
  - Third Son: Prince Kuni Kuniyoshi (久邇宮邦彦王, 23 July 1873 – 29 January 1929)
  - Sixth Daughter: Princess Motoko (素子女王, 27 March 1876 – 21 January 1918), Wife of Viscount Sengoku Masayuki
  - Seventh Daughter: Princess Natsuo (懐子女王, 1879 – 1880)
  - Eighth Daughter: Princess Suzuko (篶子女王, 16 October 1879 – 3 January 1947), Wife of Count Mibu Moto
  - Seventh Son: Unnamed prince (1882)
- Wife (Nyōbō): Mitsue Harada (原田光枝子)
  - Fourth Son: Prince Nashimoto Morimasa (梨本宮守正王, 9 March 1874 – 2 January 1951)
- Wife (Nyōbō): Utako Tarao (寺尾宇多子)
  - Ninth Daughter: Princess Atsuko (純子, 8 March 1884 – 13 June 1911), Wife of Viscount Oda Hidezane
  - Ninth Son: Prince Higashikuni Naruhiko(東久邇宮稔彦王, 3 December 1887 – 20 January 1990)
- Wife (Nyōbō): Tsunoda Sugako (角田須賀子)
  - Eighth Son: Prince Asaka Yasuhiko (朝香宮鳩彦王, 2 October 1887 – 13 April 1981)

== References and further reading ==
- Keene, Donald. Emperor of Japan: Meiji and His World, 1852–1912 (New York: Columbia University Press, 2002) ISBN 0-231-12340-X
- Lebra, Takie Sugiyama. Above the Clouds: Status Culture of the Modern Japanese Nobility (Berkeley: University of California Press, 1993) ISBN 978-0520076020
- Papinot, Edmond. Historical and geographical dictionary of Japan (New York: F. Ungar Pub. Co., 1948)
