= Prince Yasuhiko Asaka =

Japanese prince and general (1887–1981)

Yasuhiko Asaka
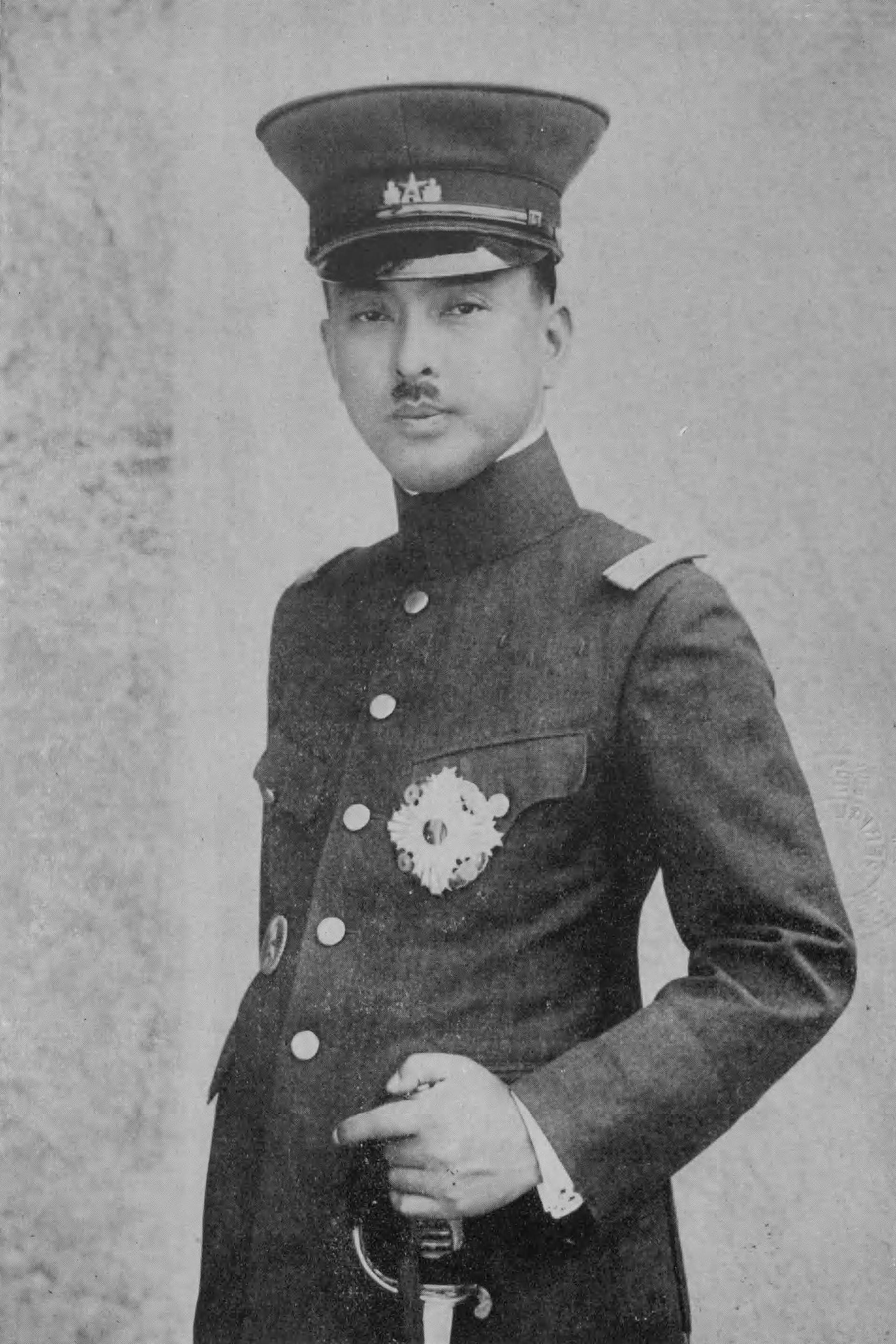

Prince Asaka
- Reign: 10 March 1906 – 14 October 1947

Head of Asaka-no-miya
- Reign: 10 March 1906 – 13 April 1981
- Born: 20 October 1887; Kyoto, Japan
- Died: 12 April 1981 (aged 93); Atami, Shizuoka, Japan
- Spouse: Nobuko, Princess Fumi (m. 1909; died 1933)
- Issue: Kikuko Asaka; Takahiko Asaka; Tadahito Asaka; Kiyoko Asaka
- Father: Asahiko, Prince Kuni
- Mother: Sugako Tsunoda
- Religion: Catholicism
- Military career
- Allegiance: Empire of Japan
- Branch: Imperial Japanese Army
- Service years: 1908–1945
- Rank: General
- Commands: Imperial Guard; Shanghai Expeditionary Army
- Conflicts: First World War; Second Sino-Japanese War; Second World War
- Awards: Grand Cordon of the Order of the Chrysanthemum; Order of the Rising Sun with Paulownia Flowers, 1st Class; Order of the Golden Kite, 1st Class

Prince Yasuhiko Asaka (朝香宮鳩彦王, Asaka-no-miya Yasuhiko-ō; 20 October 1887 – 12 April 1981) was the founder of a collateral branch of the Japanese Imperial Family and served as a general in the Imperial Japanese Army during the Japanese invasion of China and the Second World War. He was the son-in-law of Emperor Meiji and uncle by marriage of Emperor Hirohito. He is most notable for being the commander of Japanese forces outside Nanjing in December 1937, when he presided over the mass murder and rape of hundreds of thousands of Chinese soldiers and civilians during the Nanjing Massacre.

After Japan's defeat in World War II, General Douglas MacArthur granted immunity to the country's Imperial Family. As a result, Asaka was never tried for his involvement in the Nanjing (Nanking) Massacre by SCAP authorities. Nonetheless, by 1947, he and his children were stripped of their imperial status. He later converted to Catholicism and died of natural causes at the age of 93.

== Biography ==
=== Early years ===
Prince Yasuhiko came from Kyoto, the eighth son of Prince Kuni Asahiko and the court lady Tsunoda Sugako. Prince Kuni Asahiko was the youngest prince descended from the Fushimi-no-miya, one of the four branch houses of the imperial dynasty (shinnōke) entitled to provide a successor to the throne. In 1872, Emperor Meiji granted him the title Kuni-no-miya and authorization to begin a new collateral branch of the imperial family. Prince Yasuhiko was a half-brother of Prince Higashikuni Naruhiko, Prince Nashimoto Morimasa, Prince Kaya Kuninori, and Prince Kuni Kuniyoshi, the father of the future Empress Kōjun, the consort of Emperor Shōwa (Hirohito).

=== Marriage and family ===
On 10 March 1906, the Emperor Meiji granted Prince Yasuhiko the title Asaka-no-miya and authorization to begin a new branch of the imperial family. On 6 May 1910, Prince Asaka married Nobuko, Princess Fumi (7 August 1891 – 3 November 1933), the eighth daughter of Emperor Meiji. Prince and Princess Asaka had four children:

1. Princess Asaka Kikuko (紀久子; 12 September 1911 – 12 February 1989); married in 1931 Marquis Nabeshima Naoyasu.
2. Prince Asaka Takahiko (朝香 孚彦; 8 October 1912 – 5 May 1994); married Todo Chikako, the fifth daughter of Count Todo Takatsugu. They had two daughters, Fukuko and Minoko and a son Tomohiko.
3. Prince Asaka Tadahiko (朝香正彦; 4 January 1914 – January 1944), renounced membership in the imperial family and created Marquis Otowa, 1936. Killed in action during the Battle of Kwajalein.
4. Princess Asaka Kiyoko (湛子; 2 August 1919 – 1 August 2019); married Count Ogyu Yoshiatsu.

=== Military career ===
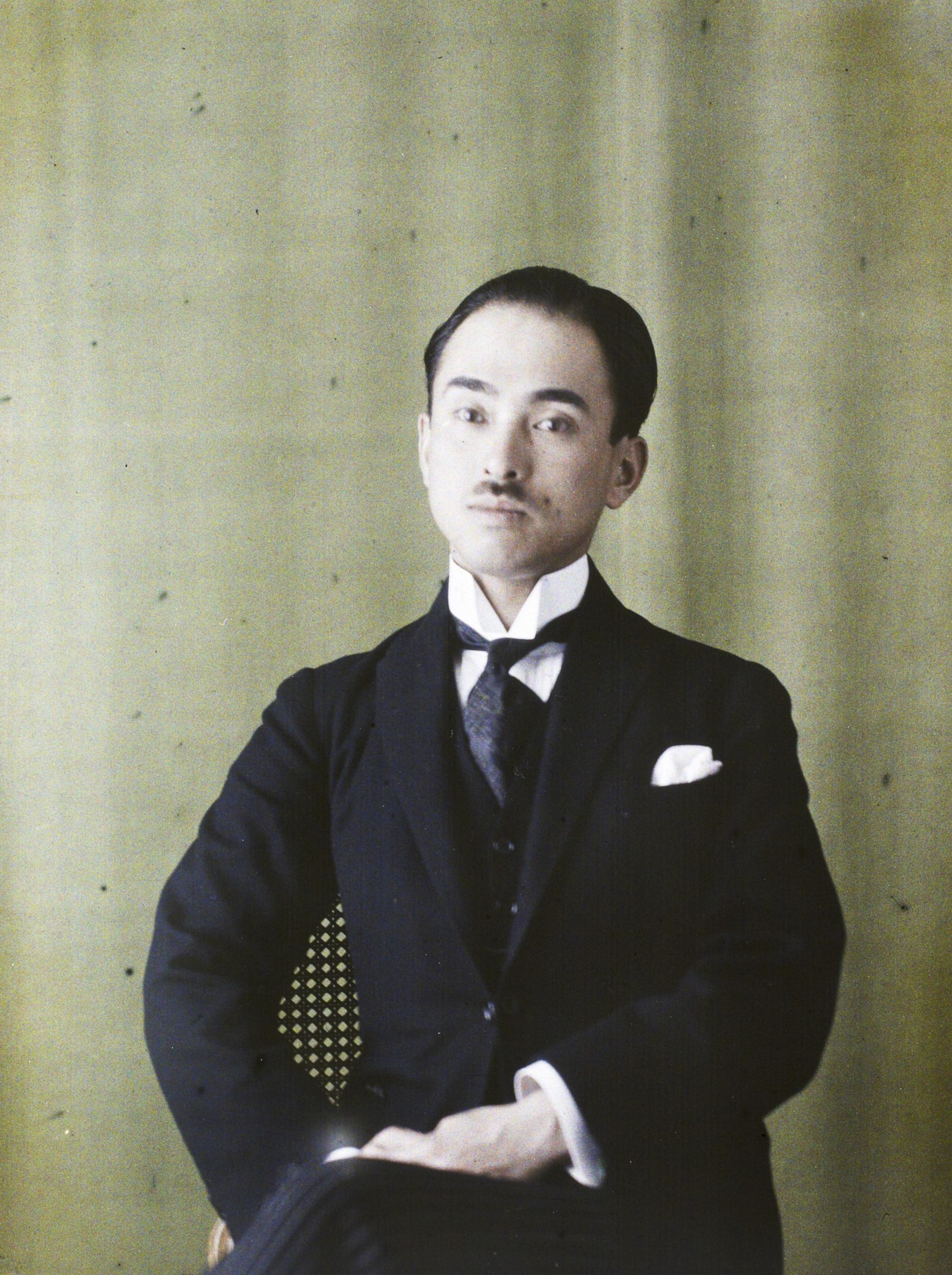
Autochrome by Georges Chevalier, 1923

Like the other imperial princes of the Meiji period, it was expected that Prince Yasuhiko would pursue a career in the military. He received his early education at the Gakushūin Peers' School and the Central Military Preparatory School, before graduating from the Imperial Japanese Army Academy on 27 May 1908. Commissioned a second lieutenant of infantry on 25 December, Prince Asaka was promoted to lieutenant in December 1910, captain in August 1913, major in July 1918, and lieutenant-colonel in August 1922. Between 1920 and 1923, Prince Asaka studied military tactics at the École spéciale militaire de Saint-Cyr in France, along with his half-brother Prince Naruhiko Higashikuni and his cousin Prince Naruhisa Kitashirakawa (1887–1923). However, on 1 April 1923, he was seriously injured in an automobile accident in Perriers-la-Campagne (Normandy) that killed Prince Kitashirakawa; the accident left Prince Asaka with a limp for the rest of his life.

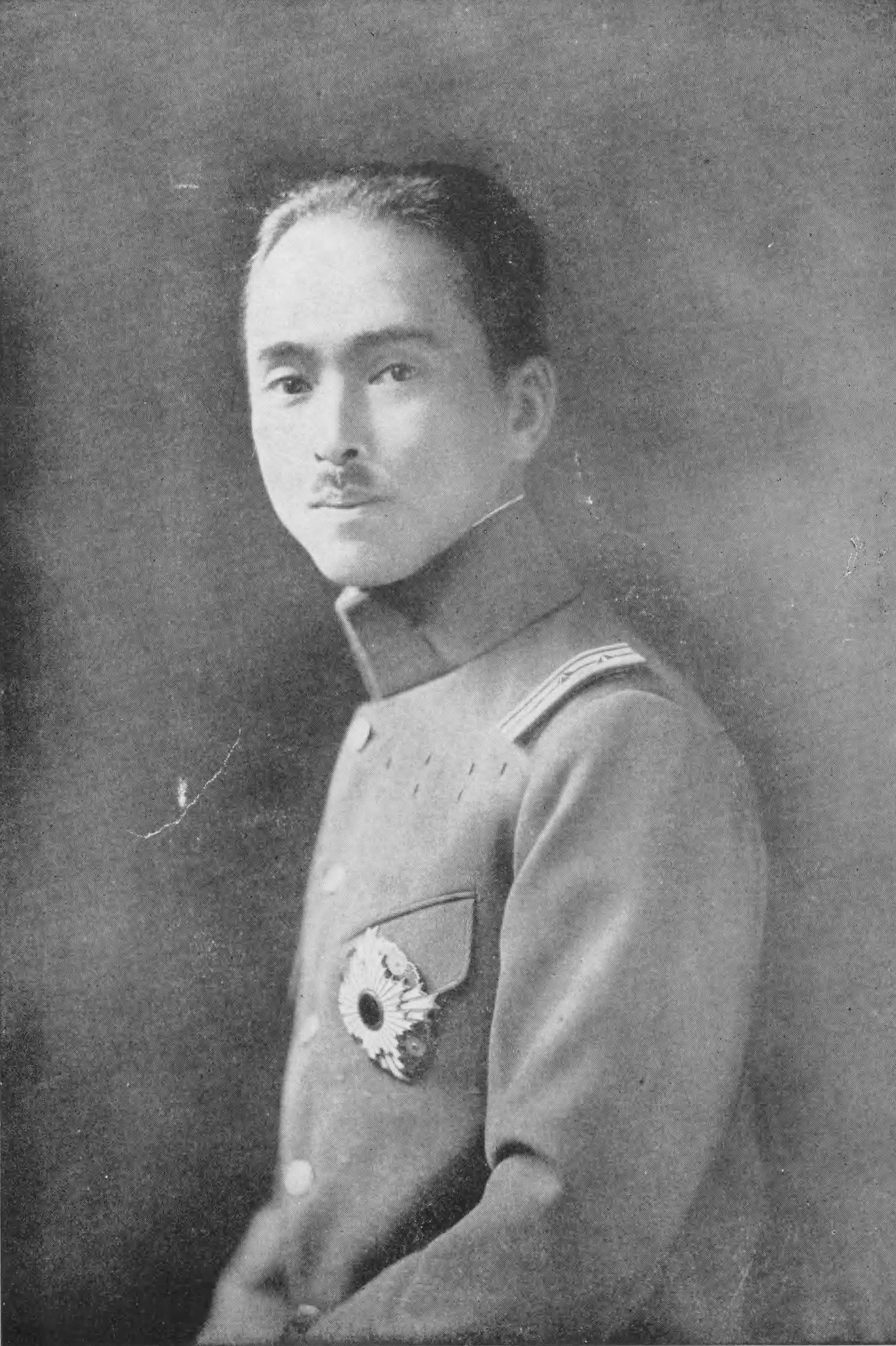
Prince Asaka as a colonel in the 1920s.

Princess Asaka traveled to France to nurse her husband. Prince and Princess Asaka also visited the United States in 1925. During that period, Prince and Princess Asaka became enthralled with the Art Deco movement. Upon returning to Japan that same year, The Prince and Princess began arranging for a new mansion to be built in the Art Deco style in Tokyo's Shirokanedai neighborhood. The house, currently the Tokyo Metropolitan Teien Art Museum, was completed in May 1933, but Princess Asaka died a few months later.

While these events were occurring, Prince Asaka had risen through the ranks of the military. After being promoted to the rank of colonel in August 1925, in December 1929, he rose to the rank of major general and was subsequently appointed an instructor at the Army Staff College in 1930. On 1 August 1933, he was promoted to lieutenant general and assumed command of the First Imperial Guards Division. In December 1935, he was appointed a member of the Supreme War Council, which gave him a very influential position with Emperor Hirohito.

However, during the abortive February 26 Incident in 1936, Prince Asaka pressed the Emperor to appoint a new government that would be acceptable to the rebels, especially by replacing Prime Minister Keisuke Okada with Kōki Hirota. The Prince's pro-Imperial Way Faction political sentiments, as well as his connections to other right-wing army cliques, caused a rift between himself and the Emperor. It was perhaps due to this rift that Prince Asaka was transferred to the Japanese Central China Area Army (under the aging General Iwane Matsui) in China in 1937.

=== Role in the Nanjing Massacre ===
In November 1937, Prince Asaka became temporary commander of the Japanese forces outside Nanjing, then capital of China, because General Matsui was ill. As temporary commander of the final assault on Nanjing between 2 and 6 December 1937, he issued the order to "kill all captives", thus providing official sanction for what became known as the "Nanjing Massacre" or the "Rape of Nanjing" (12 December 1937 – 10 February 1938).

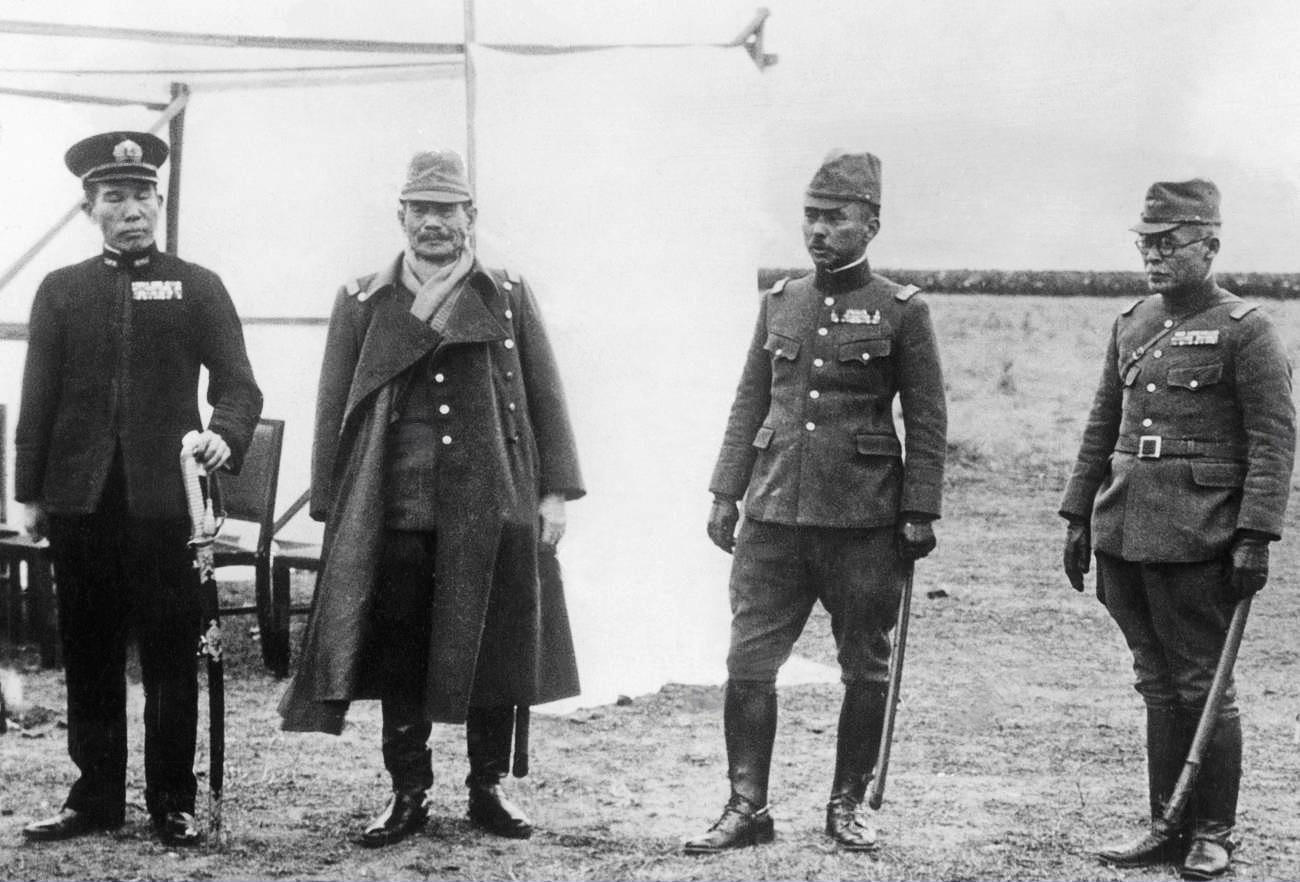
Prince Asaka (second from right) at the Memorial Ceremony for War Dead at Ku-Kung Airfield after the fall of Nanjing.

In February 1938, both Prince Asaka and General Matsui were recalled to Japan. Matsui went into virtual retirement, but Prince Asaka remained on the Supreme War Council until the end of the war in August 1945. He was promoted to the rank of general in August 1939 but held no further military commands. In 1944, he colluded with Prince Higashikuni, his nephew Prince Takamatsu, and former Prime Minister Fumimaro Konoe (1895–1945) to oust the Hideki Tojo cabinet.

==== Immunity from prosecution ====
Supreme Commander of the Allied Powers (SCAP) officials interrogated Prince Asaka about his involvement in the Nanjing Massacre on 1 May 1946, but did not bring him before the International Military Tribunal for the Far East for prosecution. Indeed, for politico-strategic and geopolitical reasons, General Douglas MacArthur decided to support the Imperial family and to grant immunity to all its members. Matsui, on the other hand, was tried, convicted, and executed for failing to prevent the massacre.

=== Postwar life as a commoner ===
On 14 October 1947, Asaka and his children lost their imperial status and privileges and became ordinary citizens, as part of the American Occupation's abolition of the collateral branches of the Japanese Imperial family. He and his son were purged from holding any political or public office because they had been officers in the Imperial Japanese Army. His Art Deco mansion in Shirokanedai was seized by the government and now houses the Tokyo Metropolitan Teien Art Museum.

The former prince moved to Atami, on the Izu Peninsula south of Tokyo. Asaka converted to Catholicism on 18 December 1951, and he was the first Imperial clansman to do so. He spent most of his time playing golf. He also took an active interest in golf course development and in the 1950s was the architect of the Plateau Golf Course at the Dai-Hakone Country Club. Asaka died of natural causes on 12 April 1981 at his home in Atami, Shizuoka. He was 93 years old.

== Honours ==
- Grand Cordon of the Order of the Chrysanthemum (31 October 1917)
- Order of the Golden Kite, 1st Class (4 April 1942)

=== Foreign honours ===
- Belgium: Grand Cordon Order of Leopold (29 April 1925)
