= Asaka-no-miya =

Family

Asaka
- Pronunciation: Asaka

Origin
- Region of origin: Japan

The Asaka (朝香) ōke (princely house) was the eighth oldest branch of the Japanese Imperial Family created from branches of the Fushimi-no-miya house.

== Asaka-no-miya ==
The Asaka-no-miya house was formed by Prince Yasuhiko Asaka, eighth son of Prince Kuni Asahiko. He received the house from the Meiji Emperor in 1906. Injured in an automobile accident in France in 1923, the prince remained in the country while recuperating, learning much about French culture. The princess came to France to nurse him and learned much about Art Deco at a 1925 exposition.

Upon returning to Japan, the prince took on leadership positions in the Shanghai Expeditionary Army and Imperial Guard, becoming an army general. As the commander of Japanese forces outside Nanjing in December 1937, Asaka presided over the mass murder of hundreds of thousands of Chinese soldiers and civilians in what came to be known as the Nanjing Massacre. During the closing years of the Pacific War he prepared the Army and Navy for a joint mainland endgame.

Prince Yasuhiko joined the mass resignation from the imperial household in 1947, and took up golf. He died in 1981; his summer estate is now a hotel.

	Name	Born	Succeeded	Retired	Died
1	Prince Asaka Yasuhiko (朝香宮 鳩彦王, Asaka-no-miya Yasuhiko-ō)	1887	1906	1946	1981
2	Asaka Takahiko (朝香 孚彦, Asaka Takahiko)	1912	1981	.	1994
3	Asaka Tomohiko (朝香 誠彦, Asaka Tomohiko)	1944	1994	.	

== Asaka Takahiko ==
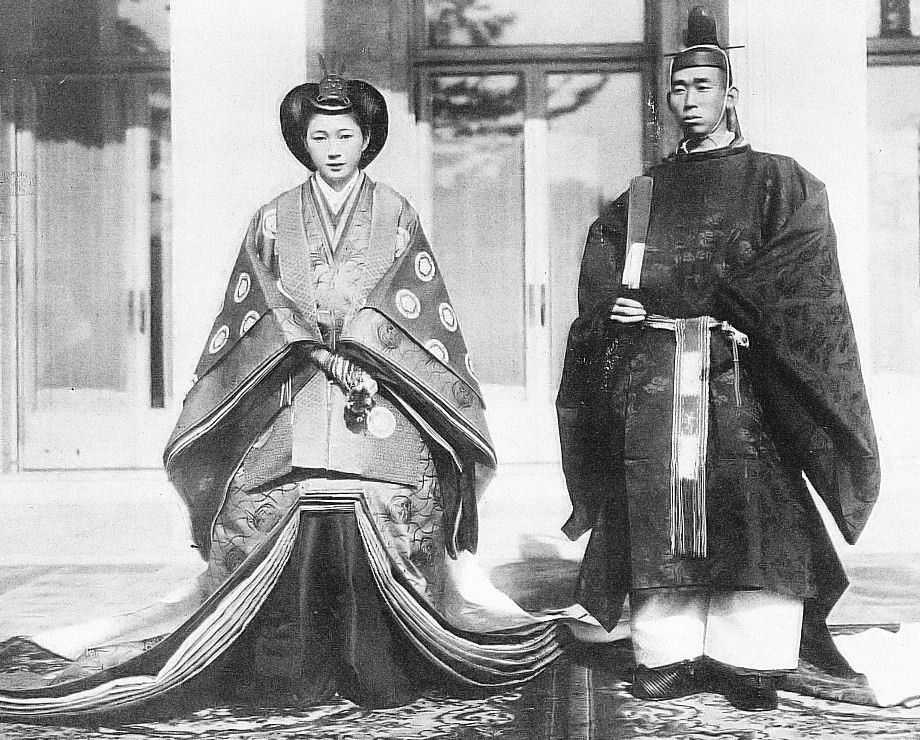
Prince Asaka Takahiko and his wife (February 1938)

Prince Takahiko was the eldest son of Asaka Yasuhiko. He was a lieutenant colonel at the end of the second world war. In 1947, he abandoned his Imperial status and took on the name Asaka Takahiko.
