= Kuni-no-miya =

Branch of the Japanese Imperial Family

Kuni
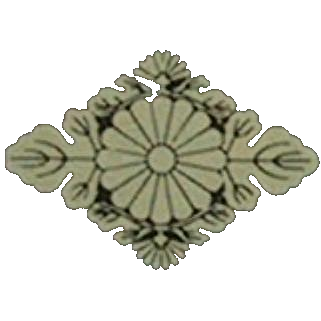
- Emblem of the Kuni-no-miya
- Parent family: Fushimi-no-miya
- Founder: Prince Kuni Asahiko
- Current head: Kuni Kuniaki
- Cadet branches: Kaya-no-miya; Asaka-no-miya; Higashikuni-no-miya

The Kuni (久邇宮, Kuni-no-miya) (princely house) was the second oldest collateral branch (ōke) of the Japanese imperial family created from the Fushimi-no-miya, the oldest of the four branches of the imperial dynasty allowed to provide a successor to the Chrysanthemum Throne should the main imperial line fail to produce an heir.

The Kuni-no-miya house was formed in 1871 by Prince Asahiko, fourth son of Prince Fushimi Kuniye, an adopted son of Emperor Ninkō and later a close advisor to Emperor Kōmei and Emperor Meiji. He was the great great grandfather of the present Emperor of Japan, Emperor Naruhito.

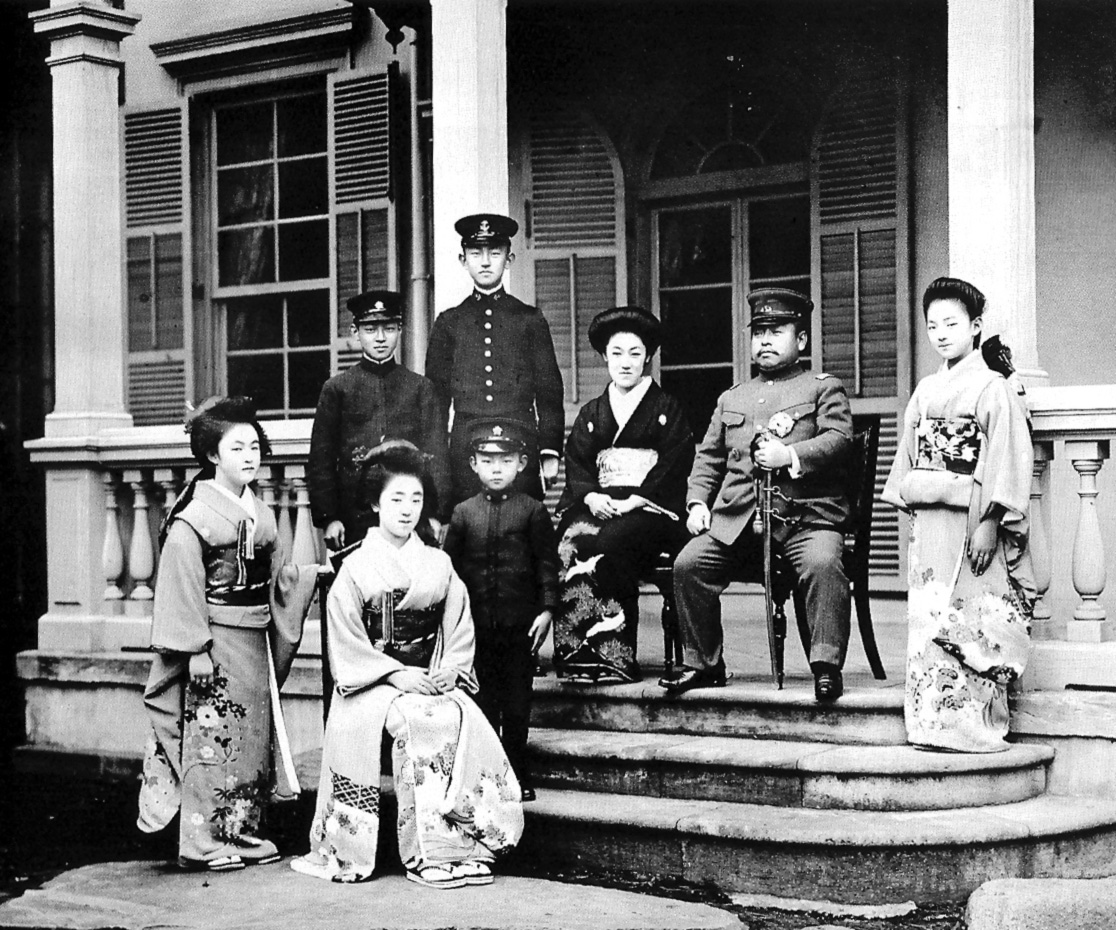
The family of Prince Kuni Kuniyoshi, 1920

On October 14, 1947, Prince Kuni Asaakira and his children lost their imperial status and became ordinary citizens, as part of the American Occupation's abolition of the collateral branches of the Japanese Imperial family.

The Kuni-no-miya palace was located in Azabu, Tokyo. The site is now occupied by the University of the Sacred Heart.

	Name	Born	Succeeded	Retired	Died	Notes
1	Prince Kuni Asahiko (久邇宮 朝彦親王, Kuni-no-miya Asahiko shinnō)	1824	1863	.	1891	became shinnō in 1871. Adopted son of Emperor Ninkō, fourth son of Prince Fushimi Kuniye.
2	Prince Kuni Kuniyoshi (久邇宮 邦彦王, Kuni-no-miya Kuniyoshi ō)	1873	1891	.	1929	father of Empress Kōjun
3	Prince Kuni Asaakira (久邇宮 朝融王, Kuni-no-miya Asaakira ō)	1901	1929	.	1959	
4	Kuni Kuniaki (久邇 邦昭)	1929	1959	.	2026	
