= Prince Kaya Kuninori =

Prince Kaya Kuninori 賀陽宮邦憲王
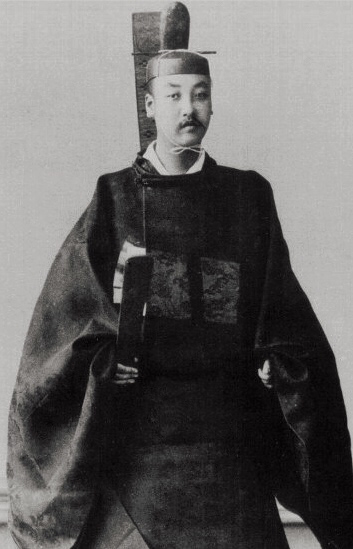

Prince Kaya
- Reign: 1892–1909
- Successor: Prince Kaya Tsunenori
- Born: 1 September 1867; Kyoto, Japan
- Died: 8 December 1909 (aged 42)
- Spouse: Princess Daigo Yoshiko
- Issue: Prince Kaya Tsunenori; Princess Kaya Sakiko
- Father: Prince Kuni Asahiko
- Mother: Izumitei Shizue

Prince Kaya Kuninori (賀陽宮邦憲王, Kaya-no-miya Kuninori Shinnō) (1 September 1867 – 8 December 1909) was a member of the Japanese imperial family and the founder of one of the nine ōke (or princely houses) in the Meiji period.

== Early life ==
The prince was born in Kyoto, as the second of the nine sons of Prince Kuni Asahiko (1824–1891) at the time of the Meiji Restoration. His father, a scion of the collateral imperial line of Fushimi-no-miya, was a laicized Buddhist priest who became a close advisor to the Emperor Kōmei and Emperor Meiji, His mother was the court-lady Izumitei Shizue.

Originally titled Iwa-no-miya, he was called Iwaomaro-ō from 15 March 1874. He changed his personal name to Kuninori on 21 July 1886. Unlike his younger half-brothers, Prince Nashimoto Morimasa, Prince Higashikuni Naruhiko, and Prince Asaka Yasuhiko, Prince Kuninori did not pursue a military career. He was excluded from succeeding to the house of Kuni-no-miya on the grounds of ill health on 7 March 1887.

== A new princely family ==
Emperor Meiji granted Prince Kuninori the title Kaya-no-miya (ad personam) and the rank of shinnō; on 17 December 1892. Later, on 4 May 1900, the emperor authorized him to form a new collateral branch of the imperial family.

Prince Kaya Kuninori succeeded his father as supreme priest (saishu) of the Shinto Grand Shrine of Ise and served in that post until his death.

== Marriage & family ==
On 26 November 1892, the Prince Kaya Kuninori married Daigo Yoshiko ( 7 December 1865 – 21 November 1941), the daughter of Marquis Daigo Tadayori, the last kuge of that line of court nobles. Prince and Princess Kaya had four children:

1. Princess Yukiko (由紀子女王; 23 November 1895–1946); married Viscount Machijiri
2. Prince Tsunenori (恒憲王; 7 January 1900 – 3 January 1978); married Kujō Toshiko, fifth daughter of Prince Kujō Michizane and niece of Empress Teimei, the consort of Emperor Taishō.
3. Princess Sakiko (佐紀子女王; 30 March 1903 – 1 September 1923); married her second cousin Prince Yamashina Takehiko; no issue. She was residing with her husband at their home in Yuigahama, Kamakura, Kanagawa prefecture at the time of the Great Kantō earthquake. The building collapsed, killing the princess and her unborn child.

== Gallery ==
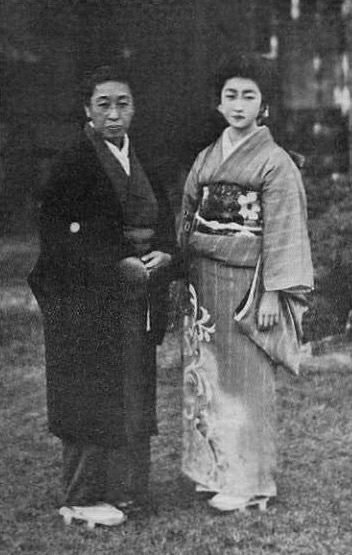
HIH Princess Kaya Yoshiko with daughter Sakiko

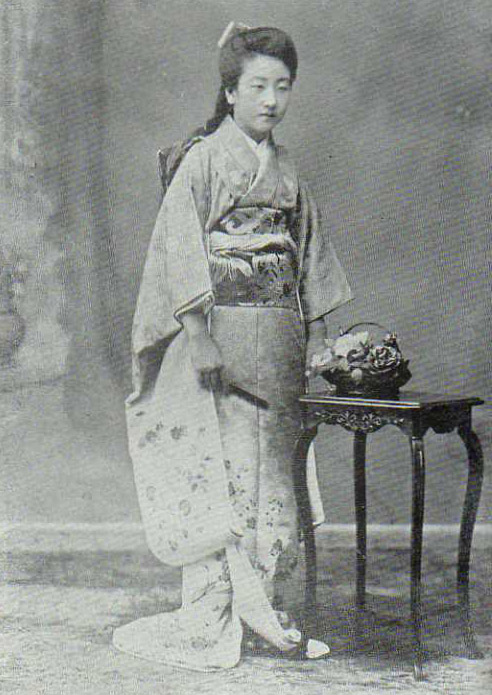
HIH Princess Kaya Yukiko

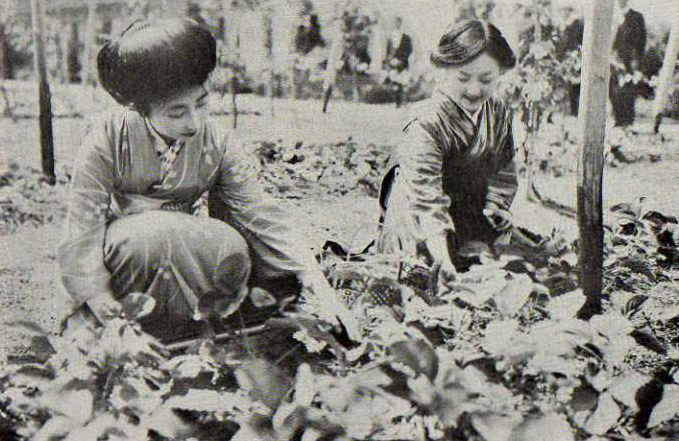
HIH Princess Kaya Sakiko and Kuni Satoko
