= Prince Kuni Asaakira =

Japanese admiral and politician (1901–1959)

Prince Asaakira
- 久邇宮朝融王
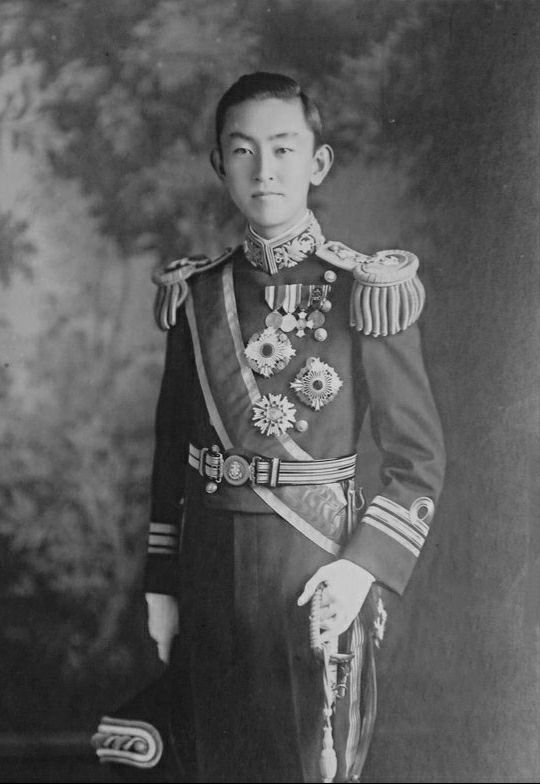
- Prince Kuni Asaakira (1932–1937)
- Born: 2 February 1901; Tokyo, Japan
- Died: 7 December 1959 (aged 58); Tokyo, Japan
- Military career
- Allegiance: Empire of Japan
- Branch: Imperial Japanese Navy
- Service years: 1921–1945
- Rank: Vice Admiral
- Commands: Yakumo, Kisarazu Naval Air Group, Takao Naval Air Group, 19th Combined Air Group, 20th Combined Air Group
- Conflicts: World War II
- Awards: Order of the Golden Kite (3rd class); Grand Cordon of the Supreme Order of the Chrysanthemum

Member of the House of Peers
- In office 2 February 1921 – 23 May 1946 Hereditary peerage

Vice-Admiral Asaakira, Prince Kuni (久邇宮 朝融王, Kuni-no-miya Asaakira-ō; 2 February 1901 – 7 December 1959), was third head of the Kuni-no-miya, a collateral branch of the Japanese imperial family and vice admiral in the Japanese Imperial Navy during World War II. He was the elder brother of Empress Kōjun (Nagako), the consort of Emperor Shōwa (Hirohito), and thus a maternal uncle to the Emperor Emeritus Akihito.

== Early life ==
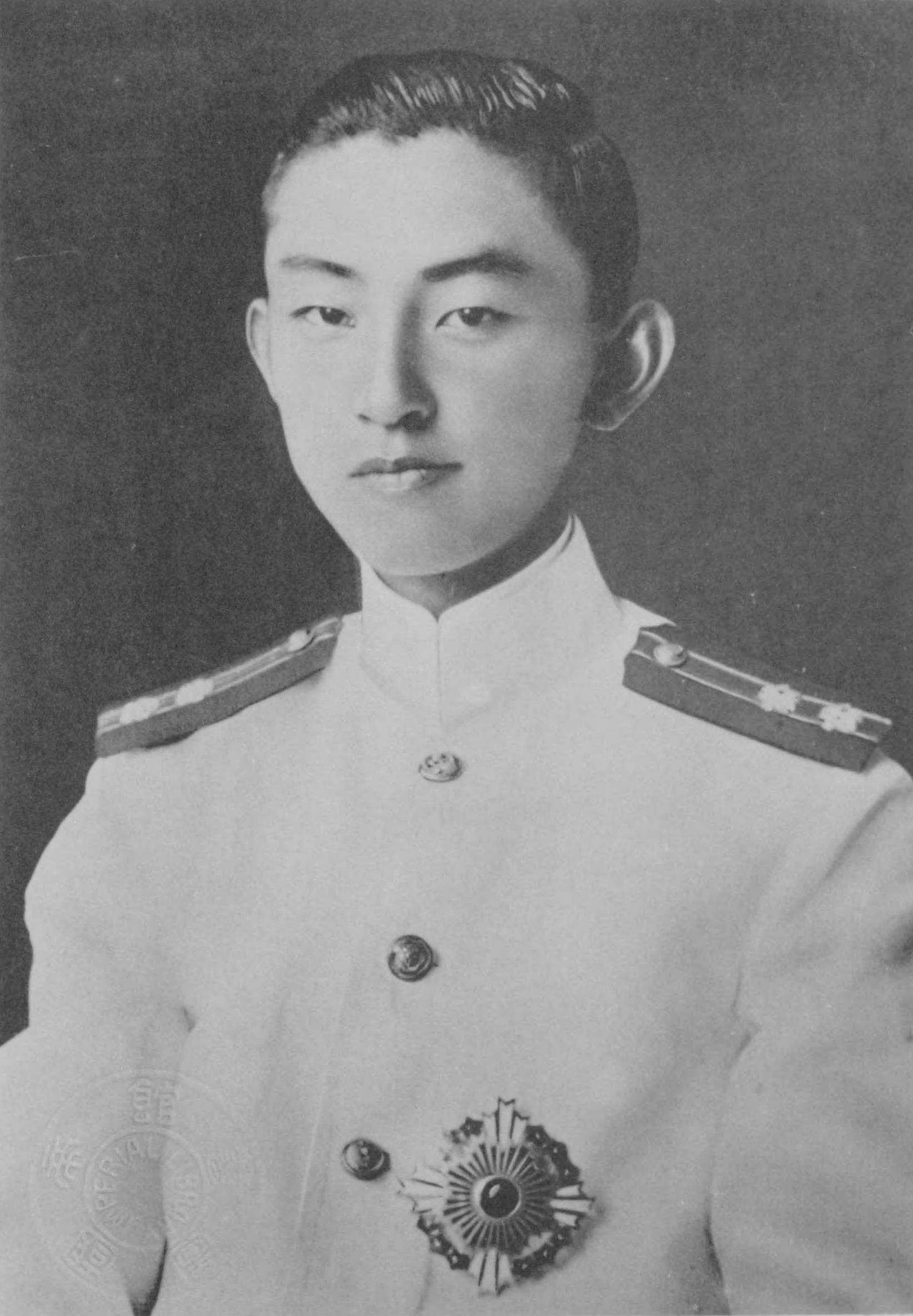
Asaakira as First Lieutenant, between December 1924 and December 1926

Prince Kuni Asaakira was born in Tokyo, the eldest son of Prince Kuni Kuniyoshi and his wife, Chikako, the seventh daughter of Prince Shimazu Tadayoshi, the last daimyō of Satsuma Domain. In 1921, he served for the customary term in the House of Peers. Upon his father's death on 29 June 1929, he succeeded as head of the Kuni-no-miya house.

== Military career ==
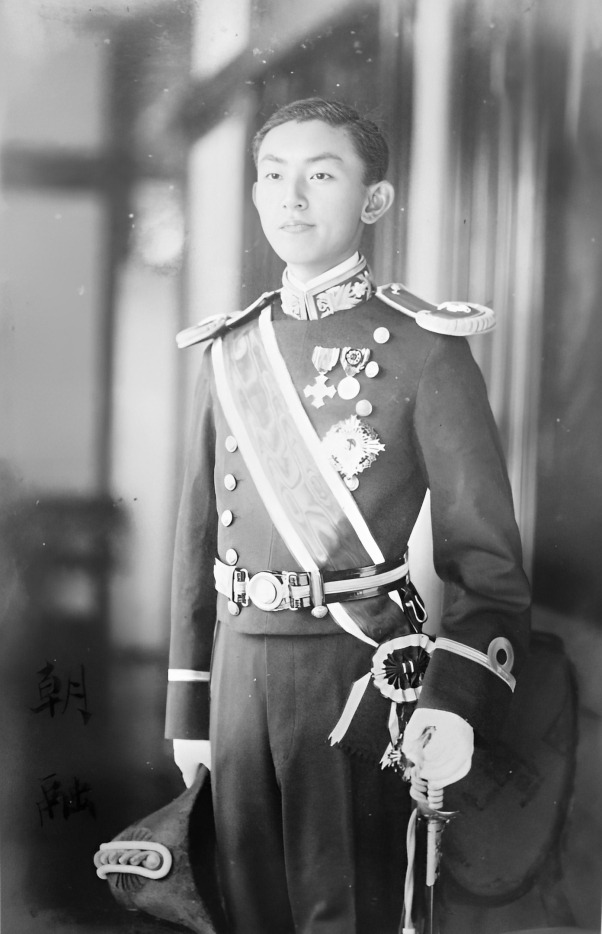
Prince Kuni Asaakira as an ensign

Prince Kuni graduated from the 49th class of the Imperial Japanese Naval Academy in 1921. He served as a midshipman on the cruiser Izumo and battleship Kirishima. After his commissioning as ensign, he was assigned to the battleship Yamashiro, followed by the battleships Ise and Nagato. After his graduation from the Naval Staff College in 1925, he was assigned to the battleship Mutsu, followed by the battleship Haruna. He rose to the rank of lieutenant in 1928. In 1931, Prince Kuni became the chief gunnery officer aboard the cruiser Kiso.

In August 1934, he transferred to the cruiser Yakumo in the same capacity. Two years later, he rose to the rank of lieutenant commander in 1936 and was assigned to the Imperial Japanese Navy General Staff Office. He was reassigned to the battleship Nagato in 1937, at the start of the Second Sino-Japanese War. He was promoted to captain in 1938. His first command was that of Yakumo from 9 July 1940. He was subsequently reassigned to naval aviation, commanding air groups at Kisarazu (1 November 1940) and Takao (20 March 1942) during World War II. Prince Kuni was promoted to rear admiral on 1 November 1942, and was given personnel of the Southwest Area Fleet (5 October 1942) the Japanese occupation of Timor in the Pacific War. He was promoted to the rank of vice admiral on 1 May 1945, and remained on active service with Imperial Japanese Navy Aviation Bureau in the southern front until the end of the war.

== Marriage and family ==
On 25 July 1925, Prince Kuni Asaakira married his cousin, Princess Tomoko (18 May 1907 – 30 June 1947), the third daughter of Prince Fushimi Hiroyasu. Prince and Princess Kuni Asaakira had eight children: five daughters and three sons:

1. Princess Kuni Masako (正子女王; b. 8 December 1926) married to Prince Nashimoto Norihiko (formerly Count Tatsuda Norihiko, son of Prince Kuni Taka and adopted by Princess Nashimoto Itsuko) from 1945 to 1980.
2. Princess Kuni Asako (朝子女王; 23 October 1927 – 21 August 1964)
3. Prince Kuni Kuniaki (久邇邦昭; b. 25 March 1929)
4. Princess Kuni Michiko (通子女王; b. 14 September 1933)
5. Princess Kuni Hideko (英子女王; b. 21 July 1937)
6. Prince Kuni Asatake (久邇朝建; b. 11 May 1940)
7. Princess Kuni Noriko (典子女王; b. 18 September 1941)
8. Prince Kuni Asahiro (久邇朝宏; b. 7 October 1944)

== As a commoner ==
On 14 October 1947, Prince Kuni Asaakira and his children lost their imperial status and became ordinary citizens, as part of the American Occupation's abolition of the collateral branches of the Japanese Imperial family. As a former naval officer, he was also barred from holding any public office. Hoping to capitalize on his close ties to the throne (his sister was the empress), former prince Kuni Asaakira started a luxury perfume line carrying the imperial chrysanthemum logo. However, since few Japanese had money to purchase luxury items during the American Occupation, the Kuni Perfume Company quickly went bankrupt. He later became president of the Japan Shepherd Dog Association, and an avid orchid grower, and held posts in the Association of Shinto Shrines, the religious corporation which succeeded the government in the control of Shinto shrines.

The former prince died of a heart attack at age 57 and his elder son Kuniaki Kuni (born 25 March 1929) succeeded him as titular head of the former Kuni-no-miya family.

== Gallery ==
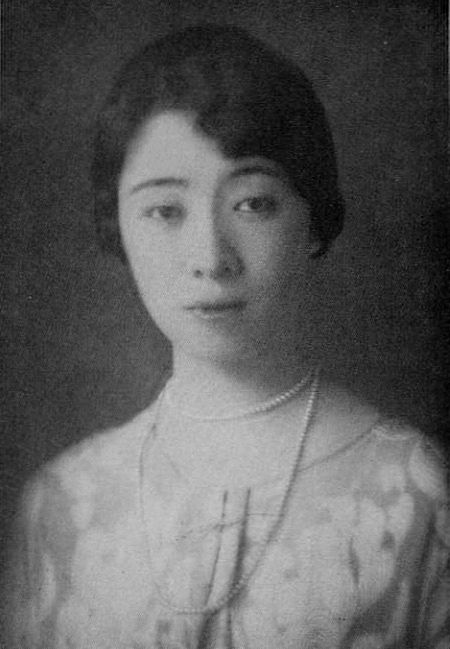
HIH Princess Kuni Tomoko, consort
