= Imperial Household Law =

Japanese law

The Imperial Household Law of 1947 (皇室典範, Kōshitsu Tenpan) is a Japanese law that governs the line of imperial succession, the membership of the imperial family, and several other matters pertaining to the administration of the Imperial Household.

== Passage of the law ==
The Imperial Household Law was drafted by the government of Prime Minister Shigeru Yoshida and was passed during the Shōwa era on January 16, 1947, by the last session of the Imperial Diet. This law superseded the Imperial Household Law of 1889, which had enjoyed co-equal status with the Constitution of the Empire of Japan and could only be amended by the Emperor. The revised statute is subordinate to the Constitution of Japan, which went into effect on May 3, 1947. It develops Chapter 1: Article 2 of the Constitution of Japan, which states: "The Imperial Throne shall be dynastic and succeeded to in accordance with the Imperial House Law passed by the Diet".

== Provisions and intent ==
The law had the effect of dramatically restricting membership in the Imperial Family to the Emperor Hirohito's immediate family, his widowed mother, and the families of his three brothers. It abolished the collateral lines of the Imperial Family, the shinnōke and the ōke, which had traditionally been a pool of potential successors to the throne if the main imperial family failed to produce an heir.

The fifty-one members of the eleven ōke cadet branches (Yamashita, Kaya, Kuni, Nashimoto, Asaka, Higashikuni, Takeda, Kitashirakawa, Fushimi, Kan'in and Higashifumi) renounced their Imperial status, and they were formally removed from the Imperial household register and became ordinary citizens on October 14, 1947.

The new law retained the principle of agnatic succession enshrined in the 1889 law and Prussian-influenced constitution during the 19th century Meiji Restoration. The new law further restricted the succession to legitimate-born sons, grandsons, and male line descendants of an Emperor. Previously, an Emperor's sons and grandsons born by concubines and their male line descendants could succeed to the throne. Although Imperial chronologies include eight reigning empresses in the course of Japanese history, their successors were most often selected from amongst the males of the paternal Imperial bloodline, which is why some conservative scholars argue that the women's reigns were temporary and that male-only succession tradition must be maintained in the 21st century. Empress Genmei (661–721), who was followed on the throne by her daughter, Empress Genshō (680–748), remains the sole exception to this conventional argument.

In addition, the law contained numerous mechanisms to regulate the future size of the Imperial Family, and thus the financial burden on the state.

The chapters of the Imperial Household Law addresses the following:

1. The order of succession to the throne
2. The establishment of a regency should the Emperor be a minor or suffer from a serious ailment
3. The membership of the Imperial Family
4. The composition of the Imperial Household Council
5. The titles and styles held by the Emperor and members of the imperial family
6. The marriages of the Emperor, the Crown Prince, and the princes of the blood; and,
7. The rites for Imperial funerals, Imperial mausoleum, and the maintenance of the Imperial Family registry.

=== Chapter ===
The contents of this Act are as follows.

- Chapter 1. Succession to the Imperial Throne
- Chapter 2. The Imperial Family
- Chapter 3. Regency
- Chapter 4. Majority; Honorific Titles; Ceremony of Accession; Imperial Funeral; Record of Imperial Lineage; and Imperial Mausoleums
- Chapter 5. The Imperial House Council
- Chapter 6. A man who was adopted into the Imperial Family (Effective October 24th, 2026)

==== Chapter 1 ====
Chapter 1: Article 1 of the Imperial Household Law states: "The Imperial Throne shall be succeeded to by a male offspring in the male line belonging to the Imperial Lineage".The line of succession is detailed in Article 2 as:

1. The eldest son of the Emperor
2. The eldest son of the Emperor's eldest son
3. Other descendants of the eldest son of the Emperor
4. The second son of the Emperor and his descendants
5. Other descendants of the Emperor
6. Brothers of the Emperor and their descendants
7. Uncles of the Emperor and their descendants

In case there is no person who meets the above requirements the, Throne shall be passed to the member of the Imperial family next nearest in lineage.

Matters relating to regency and membership of the imperial family are managed by the Imperial Household Council as stated under this law.

Upon the demise of the Emperor, the Imperial Heir (Kōshi, 皇嗣) immediately succeeds to the Imperial Throne.

==== Chapter 2 ====
The members of the Imperial Family (Kōzoku, 皇族) are the following people. 《Articles 5 through 7》

The Empress (Kōgō,皇后)
The Consort of the Emperor.

The Grand Empress Dowager (Tai-kōtaigō, 太皇太后)
The Consort of the Emperor two reigns ago.

The Empress Dowager (Kōtaigō, 皇太后)
The Consort of the previous Emperor.

Shinnō (親王)
The meaning of "Prince". The legitimate children of an Emperor and the legitimate grandchildren of an Emperor in the legitimate male line shall, in the case of a male, fall into this category. If Ō (王) succeeds to the Imperial Throne, his brothers who are also Ō (王) shall also fall into this category.

The consorts of Shinnō (Shinnō-hi, 親王妃)
the consorts of "Shinnō (親王)".

Naishinnō (内親王)
The meaning of "Princess". The legitimate children of an Emperor and the legitimate grandchildren of an Emperor in the legitimate male line shall, in the case of a female, fall into this category. If Ō (王) succeeds to the Imperial Throne, his sisters who are Jo-ō (女王) shall also fall into this category.

Ō (王)
The meaning of "Prince". The legitimate descendants of an Emperor in the third and later generations in the legitimate male line shall, in the case of a male, fall into this category. However, even for individuals who meet the aforementioned conditions, if Ō succeeds to the imperial throne, his brothers are excluded from this category.

The consorts of Ō (Ō-hi, 王妃)
the consorts of "Ō (王)".

Jo-ō (女王)
The meaning of "Princess". The legitimate descendants of an Emperor in the third and later generations in the legitimate male line shall, in the case of a female, fall into this category. However, even for individuals who meet the aforementioned conditions, if Ō succeeds to the imperial throne, his sisters are excluded from this category.

The Emperor
The Emperor	Shinnō	NaiShinnō
(Successive Emperors)	Shinnō	NaiShinnō
Ō	Jo-ō
( Ō or Jo-ō).

The son of the Emperor who is the Imperial Heir (Kōshi, 皇嗣) is called "Kōtaishi (皇太子)". In case there is no Kōtaishi (皇太子), the grandson of the Emperor who is the Imperial Heir (Kōshi, 皇嗣) is called "Kōtaison (皇太孫)". 《Articles 8》

The Emperor and members of the Imperial Family cannot adopt children (excluding Chapter 6). 《Articles 9》

Members of the Imperial Family shall lose their status as members of the Imperial Family in the following cases: 《Articles 11 through 14》

- In the case of an Naishinnō, Ō, or Jo-ō aged 15 or older, provided that the individual so desires and a decision to that effect has been made by the Imperial House Council. 《Articles 11, Paragraph 1 》
- In addition to the foregoing, cases involving Shinnō (excluding Kōtaishi and Kōtaison), Naishinnō, Ō or Jo-ō, where there are unavoidable special reasons and a decision has been reached by the Imperial House Council. 《Articles 11, Paragraph 2 》
- In the case of a female member of the Imperial Family marrying someone other than the Emperor or a member of the Imperial Family. (To be deleted on October 24, 2026.)《Articles 12》
- In cases where a woman who was not originally a member of the Imperial Family but became the consort of Shinnō or Ō loses her husband, and she intends to lose her status of the Imperial Family. The same applies if she gets a divorce. 《Articles 14》

==== Chapter 3 ====
A Regency shall be established in the following cases. 《Articles 16》

- In the case where the Emperor is a minor.
- In case the Emperor is affected with a serious disease, mentally or physically, or there is a serious hindrance and is unable to perform his acts in matters of state, and decision of the Imperial House Council.

The Regency is assumed by members of the Imperial Family who have reached the age of majority, in the following order. 《Articles 17》

1. The Kōtaishi, or Kōtaison
2. A Shinnō and an Ō
3. The Empress
4. The Empress Dowager
5. The Grand Empress Dowager
6. A Naishinnō and a Jo-ō

==== Chapter 4 ====
The honorific title for the Emperor, the Empress, the Grand Empress Dowager and the Empress Dowager shall be "His/Her Majesty" (Heika, 陛下).

The honorific title for the members of the Imperial Family other than those mentioned in the preceding paragraph shall be "His/Her Imperial Highness" (Denka, 殿下).

《Articles 23》

==== Chapter 5 ====
The Imperial House Council shall be composed of ten members.

These members shall consist of two Imperial Family members, the Presidents and Vice-Presidents of the House of Representatives and of the House of Councillors, the Prime Minister, the head of the Imperial Household Agency, the Chief Judge and one other judge of the Supreme Court.

《Articles 28》

==== Chapter 6. (Effective October 24th, 2026) ====
Shinnō, consorts of Shinnō, Naishinnō, Ō, consorts of Ō, and Jo-ō (excluding the Imperial Heir and his consort) may, subject to the deliberation of the Imperial House Council, adopt a male who meets all of the following criteria: he is a legitimate male-line descendant of a person who was a male member of the Imperial Family under this Act; he is currently not a member of the Imperial Family; he is fifteen years of age or older; and he has neither a spouse nor children. He is called Yōshi-kōzoku-danshi (養子皇族男子).

He has no right of succession to the throne.

His status as a member of the Imperial Family, and that of his descendants, is determined by actual bloodline. The same applies to the order of imperial succession for his descendants.

The provisions of Article 11, Paragraph 1 do not apply to Yōshi-kōzoku-danshi, who is Ō.

Yōshi-kōzoku-danshi shall rank last in the order of succession to the position of Regency.

《Articles 38》

== Amendments ==
The law was amended in 1949, replacing "The Imperial House Office" in Articles 28 and 30 with "The Imperial Household Agency".

Other amendments have been considered as part of the Japanese imperial succession debate, including absolute primogeniture (granting equal succession rights to princesses as to princes), letting princesses remain in the imperial family after marrying commoners, and allowing male descendants of the male line of former Imperial branch families to be adopted into the imperial family.

In 2017, the National Diet passed the Emperor Abdication Law which granted a special exemption enabling Emperor Akihito to abdicate within three years. He abdicated on 30 April 2019 and was succeeded by his eldest son, Naruhito on 1 May 2019. The Liberal Party abstained from the vote, saying the abdication should be handled by changing the Imperial Household Law rather than passing a special law.

=== 2026 amendment ===
For the first time in almost 80 years, the National Diet passed a government bill substantially amending the Imperial House Law in 2026. The House of Representatives approved the bill on 10 July, and the House of Councillors approved it on 17 July by 184 votes to 57.

The amendment allows female members of the imperial family holding the ranks of naishinnō or joō to retain their imperial status after marrying men outside the imperial family. Their husbands and children do not acquire imperial status. Transitional provisions allow women already holding either rank when the amendment enters into force to choose to leave the imperial family upon marriage.

The amendment also establishes a procedure by which a shinnō, a consort of a shinnō, a naishinnō, an ō, a consort of an ō, or a joō, other than the imperial heir and the imperial heir's consort, may adopt an eligible male with the approval of the Imperial Household Council. The prospective adoptee must be at least 15 years old, unmarried and childless, and a legitimate male-line descendant of a former male member of the imperial family. An adopted man becomes a member of the imperial family but is not himself eligible to succeed to the throne; his male-line male descendants are eligible and the succession rights of them are determined according to the natural male-line ancestry.

The amendment does not alter the restriction of the imperial succession to male descendants in the male line. Its principal provisions are to take effect three months after promulgation, while certain supplementary provisions take effect on the date of promulgation.

On July 24, the revised Imperial Household Law was formally promulgated as Law No. 66 of 2026 and took effect on October 24. It was the first substantive amendment to the main provisions of the current law since its enactment in 1947.

== See also ==
- Emperor of Japan
- Imperial House of Japan
- Japanese succession debate
- 2019 Japanese imperial transition
