= Prince Nashimoto Moriosa =

Prince Nashimoto Moriosa 梨本宮 守脩親王
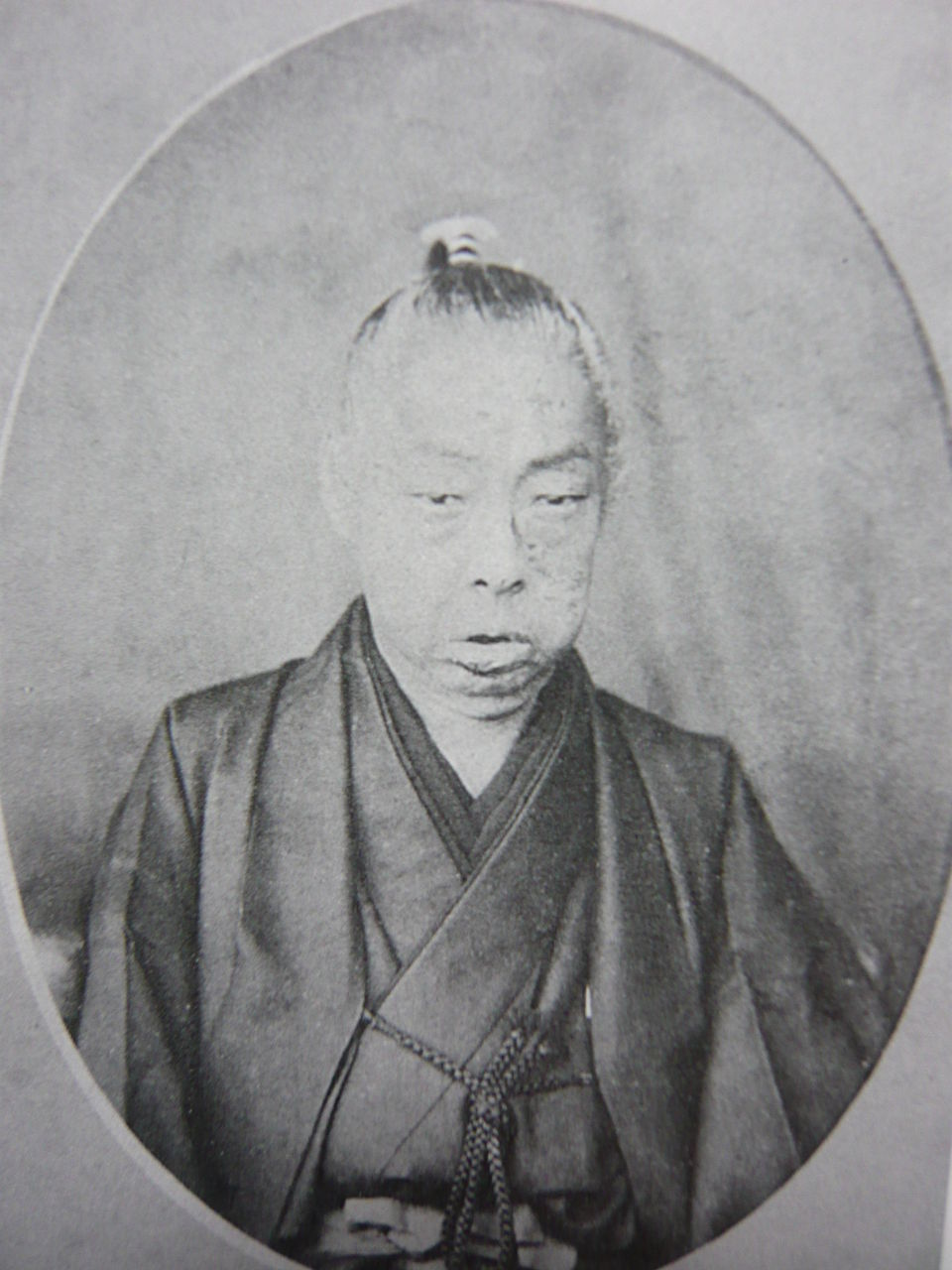
- Born: 16 December 1819; Kyoto, Japan
- Died: 2 December 1885 (aged 65); Tokyo, Japan
- Father: Prince Fushimi Sadayoshi

Prince Nashimoto Moriosa (梨本宮 守脩親王, Nashimoto-no-miya Moriosa-shinnō; 16 December 1819 – 2 December 1885) was the founder of a collateral line of the Japanese imperial family.

Prince Moriosa was born in Kyoto, the 10th son of Prince Fushimi Sadayoshi (1775–1841), the nineteenth head of the Fushimi-no-miya, the oldest of the four branches of the imperial dynasty allowed to provide a successor to the Chrysanthemum Throne should the main imperial house fail to produce an heir. He was adopted by Emperor Kōkaku, but later became a Buddhist priest at the monzeki temple of Emman-in. He was named Kajii-no-miya and rose to become head of the Tendai sect.

After the Meiji Restoration, in 1868, Emperor Meiji recalled him (along with all other Imperial princes residing in Buddhist temples) to secular status, and he resumed the secular name Moriosa-ō. In 1870, Emperor Meiji granted him the title Nashimoto-no-miya and permission to form a new princely house (ōke).

As Prince Nashimoto was childless, he adopted Prince Yamashina Kikumaro, the eldest son of Prince Yamashina Akira, as his heir. Prince Nashimoto Moriosa died on 2 December 1885 but Prince Kikumaro remained in the Yamashina-no-miya family, and the Nashimoto-no-miya title passed to Prince Morimasa, the fourth son of Prince Kuni Asahiko instead.

== References and further reading ==
- Keene, Donald. Emperor of Japan: Meiji and His World, 1852–1912 (New York: Columbia University Press, 2002) ISBN 0-231-12340-X
- Lebra, Takie Sugiyama. Above the Clouds: Status Culture of the Modern Japanese Nobility (Berkeley: University of California Press, 1993) ISBN 978-0-520-07602-0
- Papinot Edmond. Historical and geographical dictionary of Japan (New York: F. Ungar Pub. Co., 1948)
