= Prince Kitashirakawa Satonari =

Prince Kitashirakawa Satonari 北白川宮智成親王
- Born: 22 July 1856; Kyoto, Japan
- Died: 10 February 1872 (aged 15); Tokyo, Japan
- Father: Prince Fushimi Kuniiye
- Mother: Itami Yoshiko(伊丹吉子)

Prince Kitashirakawa Satonari (北白川宮智成親王, Kitashirakawa-no-miya Satonari-shinnō; 22 July 1856 – 10 February 1872) was the founder of a collateral branch of the Japanese imperial family.

== Early life ==
Prince Kitashirakawa Satonari was born in Kyoto, and was the thirteenth son of Prince Fushimi Kuniie (1802–1872), the twentieth head of the Fushimi-no-miya, the oldest of the four branches of the imperial dynasty allowed to provide a successor to the Chrysanthemum Throne should the main imperial house fail to produce an heir. In 1860, he was adopted by Emperor Kōmei as a potential heir to the throne.

As he was born when the country was still under rule by the Tokugawa Bakufu, he was sent into the Buddhist priesthood in 1866, and assigned to serve at the monzeki temple of Shogo-in in Kyoto. He returned to secular life in 1867 during the Meiji Restoration, and Emperor Meiji authorized him to start a new princely house (ōke), Kitashirakawa-no-miya, in 1873.

However, Prince Kitashirakawa Satonari died within the same year, and, as he was without heirs, the Kitashirakawa-no-miya title passed to his elder half-brother, Yoshihisa-ō.
