= Yoshimaro Yamashina =

Japanese ornithologist (1900–1989)

- 山階 芳麿
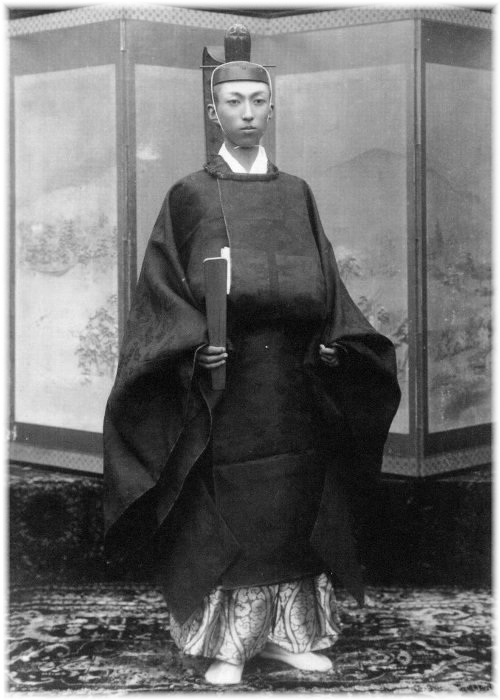
- Born: 5 July 1900; Kōjimachi, Tokyo, Japan
- Died: 28 January 1989 (aged 88); Tokyo, Japan
- Education: Tokyo Imperial University; Hokkaido University
- Father: Prince Yamashina Kikumaro
- Awards: Jean Delacour Prize (1977); Order of the Golden Ark (1978)
- Scientific career
- Fields: Ornithology
- Workplaces: Yamashina Institute for Ornithology

Marquis Yoshimaro Yamashina (山階 芳麿, Yamashina Yoshimaro; July 5, 1900 – January 28, 1989) was a Japanese ornithologist. He was the founder of the Yamashina Institute for Ornithology.

== Biography ==
Yamashina was born in Kōjimachi, Tokyo, the second son of Prince Kikumaro Yamashina and Princess Noriko (Kujo) Yamashina. Through his mother, a half-sister of the Crown Princess Sadako, he was the nephew of the then Crown Prince Yoshihito, the future Emperor Taishō. He developed a love of birds at an early age, which were found in abundance on the vast Yamashina estate in Tokyo. He was presented with a stuffed mandarin duck for his sixth birthday present.

Yamashina attended the Gakushuin Peer's School, and per the orders of Emperor Meiji entered the Imperial Japanese Army, graduating from the 33rd class of the Imperial Japanese Army Academy with a specialty in artillery.

In 1920, per a revision in the Imperial Household Law, he lost his status as an imperial prince, and became a member of the kazoku with the peerage title of marquis (kōshaku) on 20 July. He was promoted to the military rank of lieutenant from the same date, and was also conferred with the Grand Cordon of the Order of the Rising Sun. However, he resigned his commission in the Army in 1929 to pursue his interest in zoology, and entered Tokyo Imperial University, graduating in 1931.

In 1932, he set up the Yamashina Institute for Ornithology at his home in Shibuya, Tokyo, to house his extensive bird collections, ornithological library, and research facilities. He specialized in research on the avian species of Asia and the Pacific Ocean, and conducted his doctoral research on avian cytology, in affiliation with Hokkaido University. He obtained his doctorate in 1942 with studies on hybrid sterility under Professor Oguma Mamoru of Hokkaido Imperial University. In 1947, he lost his status and noble title with the adoption of the revised Japanese constitution, which abolished the peerage.

Afterwards, he devoted considerable effort into genetic research on the chromosomes of birds, and the use of DNA to distinguish between species.

In 1984, the Yamashina Institute for Ornithology moved to its present location in Abiko, Chiba.

Throughout his career, Yamashina was author of numerous technical papers, and several books. He was co-author of the Handlist of the Japanese Birds, and author of Birds in Japan (1961). In 1981 he described a new species of flightless rail from Okinawa Island. In 1966, he was awarded the Japanese Medal with Purple Ribbon and in 1977 was awarded the Jean Delacour Prize. In 1978 he received the Order of the Golden Ark from the World Wildlife Fund. Among Yamashina's scientific first descriptions are the Okinawa rail, the Daito winter wren, the Rota bridled white-eye, the long-billed white-eye, the Tinian monarch and the Palau scops owl.

Yamashina died on 28 January 1989, aged 88, three weeks after the death of his cousin Emperor Shōwa. His adopted son was Yamashina Yoshimasa, second son of his sister, Yasuko with Asano Nagatake.

== Titles ==
- 5 July 1900 - 20 July 1920: His Imperial Highness Prince Yamashina Yoshimaro
- 20 July 1920 - 3 May 1947: Yoshimaro, Marquis Yamashina
- 3 May 1947 - 28 January 1989: Dr. Yamashina Yoshimaro

== Ancestry ==
Ancestors of Yoshimaro Yamashina

16. Prince Fushimi Sadayuki (1776-1841)
8. Prince Fushimi Kuniie (1802-1872)
4. Prince Yamashina Akira (1816-1891)
9. Fujiki Toshiko
2. Prince Yamashina Kikumaro (1873-1908)
5. Nakajo Chieko
1. Marquess Yamashina Yoshimaro (1900-1989)
24. Nijō Harutaka (1754–1826)
12. Kujō Hisatada (1798–1871)
25. Higuchi Nobuko (1751–1845)
6. Prince Kujō Michitaka (1839–1906)
26. Shōbai
13. Karahashi Meiko (1796-1881)
3. Lady Kujō Noriko (1878-1901)
28. Sō Yoshikata, 13th Lord of Tsushima-Fuchū (1800-1838)
14. Sō Yoshiyori, 15th Lord of Tsushima-Fuchū (1818-1890)
29. Tada Gen
7. Sō Kazuko (1866-1920)
15. Ogawa
