= Yamashina Institute for Ornithology =

Japanese non-profit research organization

Coordinates: 35.862282°N 140.030744°E

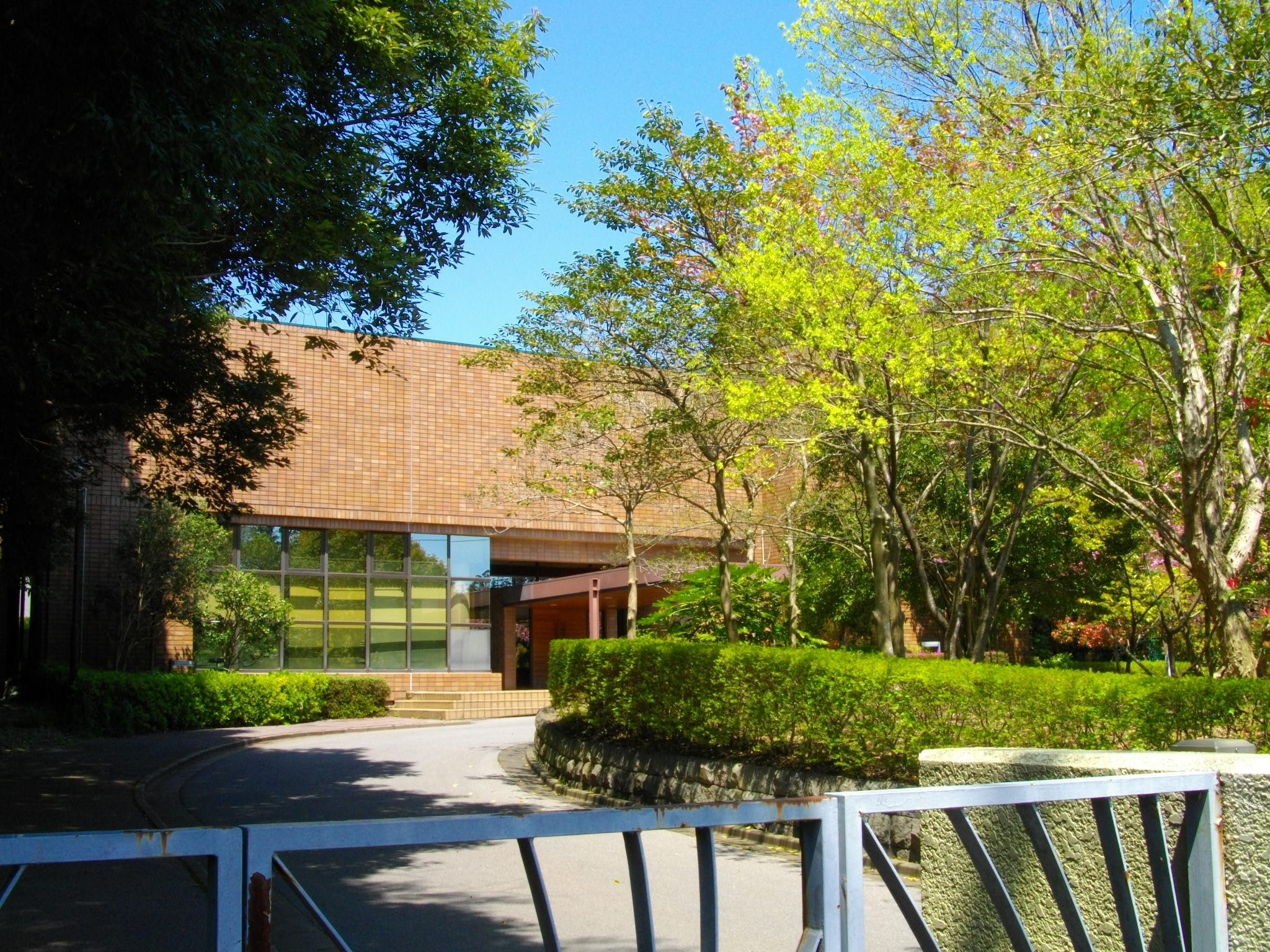
The Yamashina Institute for Ornithology

The Yamashina Institute for Ornithology (山階鳥類研究所, Yamashina Chōruikenkyūsho) is a non-profit scientific research organization in Japan, specializing in ornithology.

== History ==
The Yamashina Institute for Ornithology was founded by Dr. Yoshimaro Yamashina at his home in Shibuya, Tokyo, as a private museum to store his collection of bird specimens and books. Marquis Yamashina was the second son of Prince Yamashina Kikumaro. He opened his museum to the public in 1942. At the institute, Yamashina conducted research into bird taxonomy based on chromosomes, and wrote numerous technical journal articles and books on ornithology.

The Institute relocated to its present location approximately 30 kilometers east of Tokyo at Abiko, Chiba, in 1984. The institute has maintained close ties to the Imperial Family of Japan. It is chaired by Prince Akishino, younger brother to the Crown Prince Naruhito of Japan, and their younger sister Princess Sayako worked as a researcher at the institute from 1992 to 2005, where she specialized in the study of kingfishers.

== Organization ==
The institute is organized into three research sections:

- The Ornithology Research Laboratory specializes in the ecology and systematics of birds, including foraging patterns of marine birds and genetic variations of bird populations, mainly using DNA sequencing.
- The Bird Migration Research Center conducts bird banding campaigns, tagging more than 200,000 birds each year. It also experiments with radio telemetry, radar and satellite tracking to investigate migratory patterns.
- The Library and Collection Center maintains a collection of 69,000 different avian specimens from all over the world, especially from eastern Asia and the north-western Pacific regions and a library of 39,000 ornithological books and periodicals.

== Publications and events ==
The Yamashina Institute publishes several journals and reports, including the Journal of the Yamashina Institute for Ornithology, the annual Report of the Bird Migration Research Center and a monthly newspaper for support group members.

The institute also sponsors a biannual Yamashina Yoshimaro Memorial Ornithological Award to an individual or group who has made remarkable contributions to the development ornithology or the protection of birds.
