= Yamashina-no-miya =

Branch of the Japanese imperial family

Yamashina
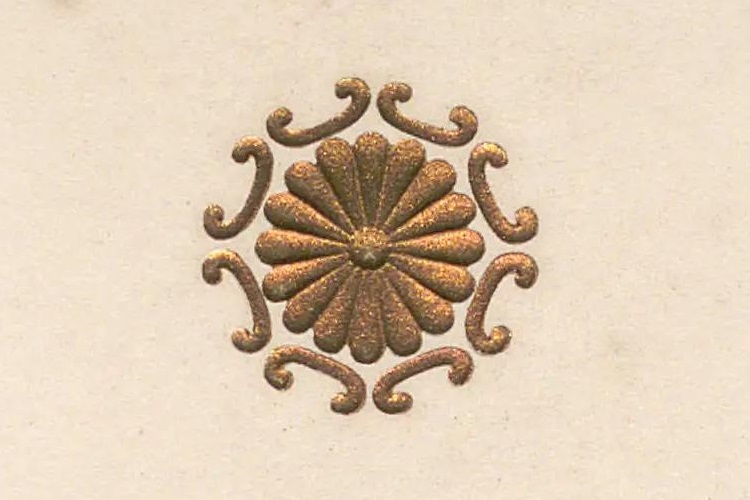

Origin
- Origin: Japanese
- Region of origin: Japan

The Yamashina (山階宮, Yamashina-no-miya) (princely house) was the third oldest collateral branch (ōke) of the Japanese imperial family created from the Fushimi-no-miya, the oldest of the four branches of the imperial dynasty allowed to provide a successor to the Chrysanthemum Throne should the main imperial line fail to produce an heir.

The Yamashina-no-miya house was formed in 1871 by Prince Akira, eldest son of Prince Fushimi Kuniye, an adopted son of Emperor Kōkaku and later of Emperor Kōmei and an advisor to Emperor Meiji in the new Meiji government.

On October 14, 1947, Prince Yamashina Takehiko lost his imperial status and became an ordinary citizen, as part of the American Occupation's abolition of the collateral branches of the Japanese Imperial family. On his death without heirs in 1987, the main line of the Yamashina-no-miya became extinct.

The Yamashina name was carried on by Prince Yamashina Takehito's younger brother, Marquis Yoshimaro Yamashina, the noted ornithologist.

The Yamashina-no-miya palace was located in the Kōjimachi district of Tokyo.

	Name	Born	Succeeded	Retired	Died	Notes
1	Prince Yamashina Akira (山階宮 晃親王, Yamashina-no-miya Akira shinnō)	1816	1864	.	1898	
2	Prince Yamashina Kikumaro (山階宮 菊麿王, Yamashina-no-miya Kikumaro-ō)	1873	1898	.	1908	
3	Prince Yamashina Takehiko (山階宮 武彦王, Yamashina-no-miya Takehito-ō)	1898	1908	1947	1987	
