= Daito wren =

Conservation status
- Extinct (ca. 1940)

Scientific classification
- Kingdom: Animalia
- Phylum: Chordata
- Class: Aves
- Order: Passeriformes
- Family: Troglodytidae
- Genus: Troglodytes
- Species: T. troglodytes
- Subspecies: †T. t. orii

Trinomial name
- †Troglodytes troglodytes orii Yamashina, 1938

Extinct subspecies of bird

The Daito wren (Troglodytes troglodytes orii) is a disputed subspecies of the Eurasian wren. It is known only by the type specimen, a male collected in 1938 on Minami Daitō-jima, the main island of the Daito Archipelago east of Okinawa. Yamashina described the bird as a new subspecies after comparing it with 114 specimens from surrounding areas and under the impression that the Eurasian wren is a fairly sedentary bird, not liable to be drifted astray over long distances. Its scientific name is named after Yamashina's specimen collector, Orii Hyōjirō.

However, vagrant Eurasian wrens have more recently been found on Yonaguni and Okinawa Islands. Thus, it has been suggested that the Daito bird was just a straggler from one of the Honshū (T. t. fumigatus), the Yakushima/Tanegashima (T. t. ogawae) or the Izu Islands (T. t. mosukei) populations. However, many bird populations on islands south of Japan also became extinct in the late 1930s as settlement and civilian and military construction destroyed large amounts of habitat. As the specimen exists (Yamashina Institute for Ornithology collection No. 25476), it should be possible to resolve its status by DNA analysis.

This subspecies is not accepted by either the IOC World Bird List, or the AviList.
