= Ōke =

Branches of the Japanese Imperial Family

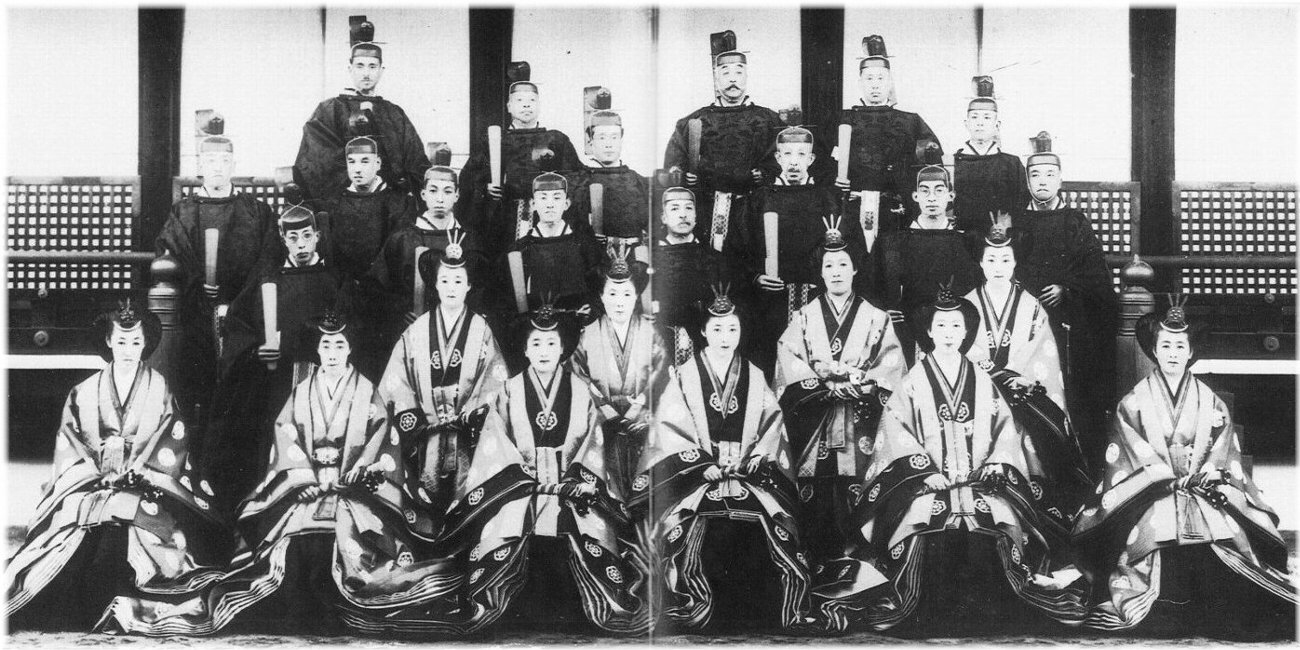
Extended imperial family members gathered at Kyoto Imperial Palace

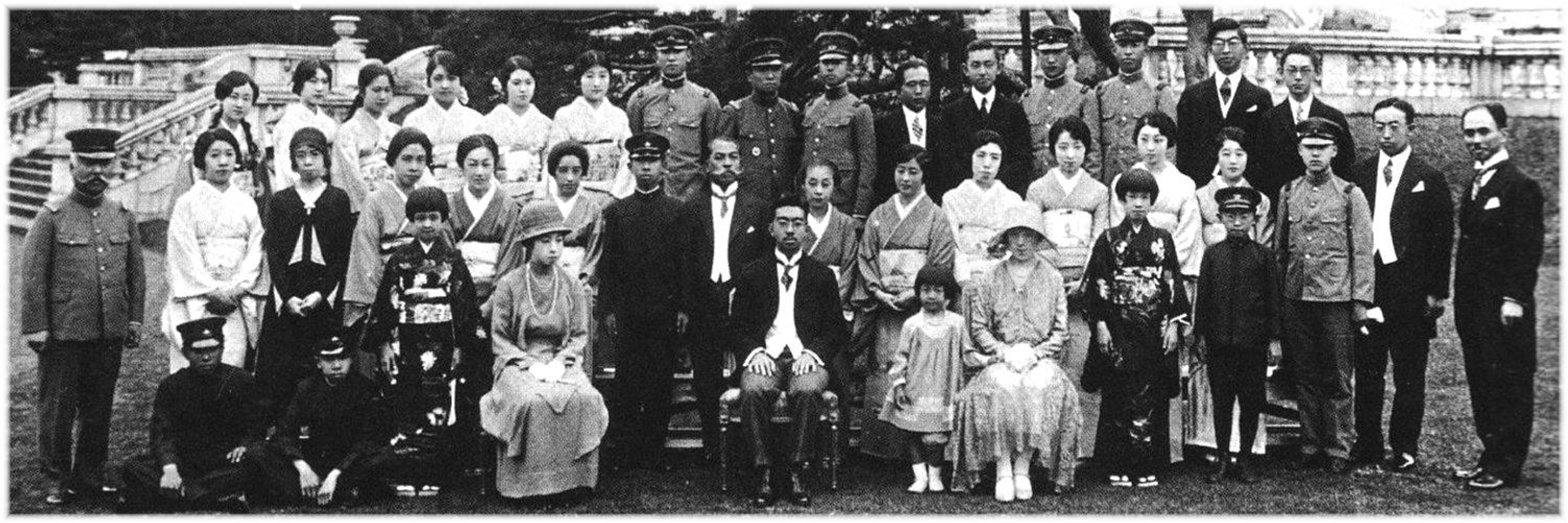
Emperor Shōwa and members of the extended imperial family (c. 1937)

The kyū-miyake (旧宮家, 'former imperial houses') are the eleven branches of the Imperial House of Japan whose members lost their imperial status on 14 October 1947.

A miyake (宮家) is a separate household of the Imperial Family, bearing a name (miya-gō, 宮号) conferred by the Emperor. Male members of the Imperial Family hold one of two princely titles: shinnō (親王) and ō (王), both conventionally translated into English as 'prince', with shinnō being the higher rank. Under the modern Imperial Household Law, sons and male-line grandsons of an Emperor are shinnō, while more distant male-line descendants are ō. Historically, certain houses were granted the rank of shinnō, regardless of their male-line distance from the reigning Emperor. These were known as seshū shinnōke (世襲親王家). By the Edo period, four such houses remained: Fushimi-no-miya, Katsura-no-miya, Arisugawa-no-miya and Kan'in-no-miya.

All eleven kyū-miyake belonged to the lineage of Fushimi-no-miya, which originated in the fourteenth century. On 13 October 1947, the Imperial Household Council approved the withdrawal of 51 members of these eleven miyake from the Imperial Family, effective the following day. The Emperor's immediate family and the three miyake headed by his younger brothers (Chichibu-no-miya, Takamatsu-no-miya and Mikasa-no-miya) retained their imperial status.

In July 2026, the National Diet amended the Imperial Household Law to allow members of the Imperial Family to adopt eligible male-line descendants of former male members of the Imperial Family. The amendment came into force on 24 October 2026.

== List of kyū-miyake ==
The member houses until 1947 were, in order of seniority:

- Yamashina (山階) - founded 1864, extinct 1987
- Kuni (久邇) - founded 1875
- Kaya (賀陽) - founded 16 December 1892
- Asaka (朝香) founded March 1906
- Higashikuni (東久邇) - founded November 1906
- Higashifushimi or Komatsu (東伏見 / 小松) - extinct in 1922
- Kitashirakawa (北白川) - founded 1870, extinct 2018
- Takeda (竹田) - founded March 1906
- Nashimoto (梨本) - founded December 1870, extinct 1951

Unless otherwise stated, all princes listed herein are the sons of their predecessor.

=== Yamashina-no-miya ===
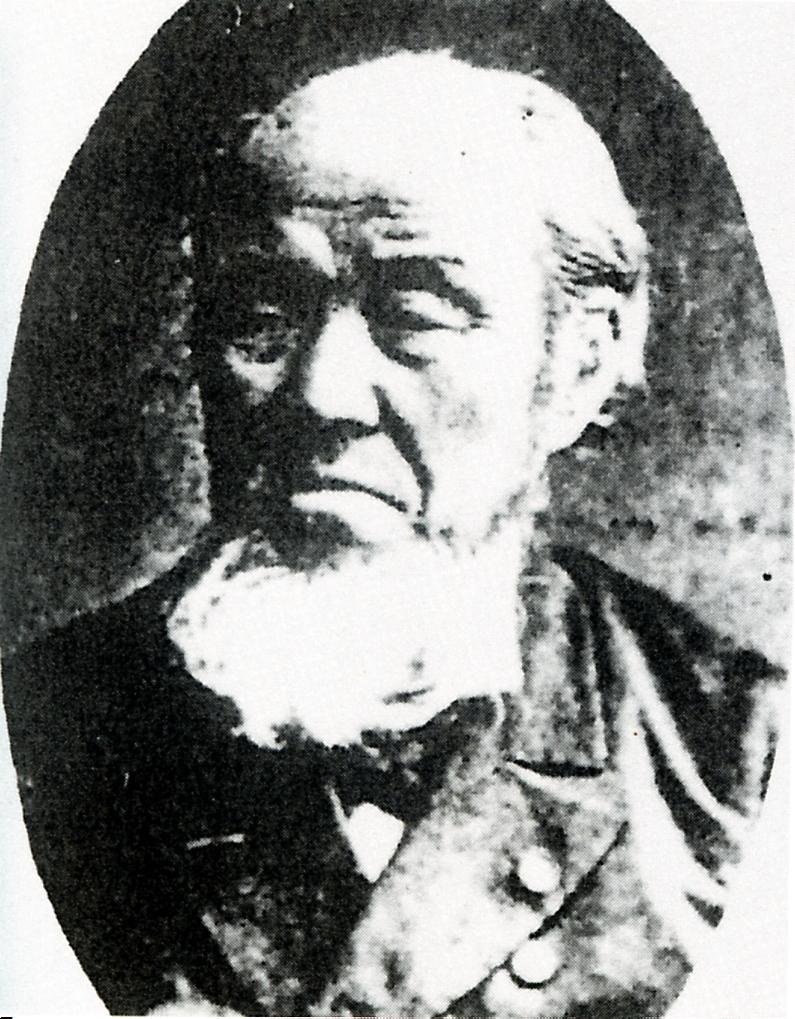
Prince Yamashina Akira (1816—1891), 1st head of the house of Yamashina-no-miya

The Yamashina-no-miya house was formed by Prince Akira, eldest son of Prince Fushimi Kuniye.

	Name	Born	Succeeded	Retired	Died	Notes
1	Prince Yamashina Akira (山階宮 晃親王, Yamashina-no-miya Akira shinnō)	1816	1864		1898	
2	Prince Yamashina Kikumaro (山階宮 菊麿王, Yamashina-no-miya Kikumaro-ō)	1873	1898		1908	
3	Prince Yamashina Takehiko (山階宮 武彦王, Yamashina-no-miya Takehito-ō)	1898	1908	1947	1987	

The Yamashina-no-miya became extinct with the death of Yamashina Takehiko.

=== Kuni-no-miya ===
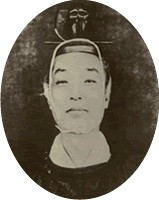
Prince Kuni Asahiko (1824-1891), 1st chapter of the Kuni no Miya house

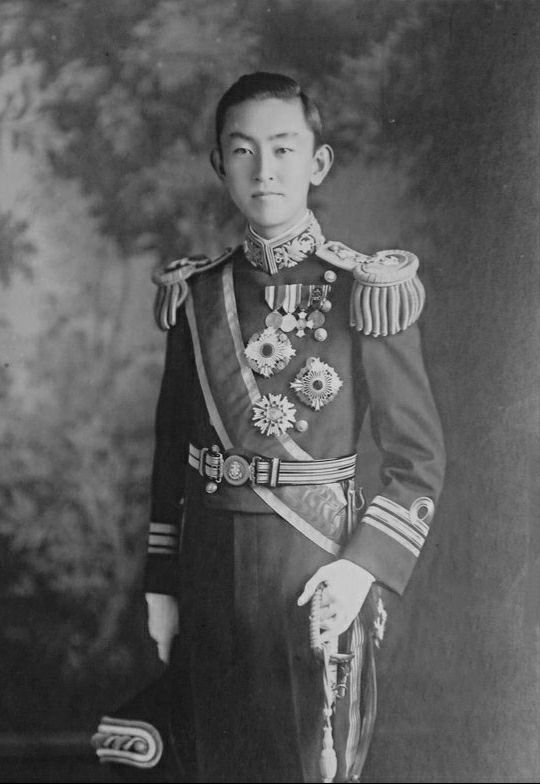
Prince Kuni Asaakira (1901-1959), 3rd head of the Kuni-no-miya house

The Kuni-no-miya house was formed by Prince Asahiko, fourth son of Prince Fushimi Kuniye

	Name	Born	Succeeded	Retired	Died	Notes
1	Prince Kuni Asahiko (久邇宮 朝彦親王, Kuni-no-miya Asahiko shinnō)	1824	1863		1891	became shinnō in 1871
2	Prince Kuni Kuniyoshi (久邇宮 邦彦王, Kuni-no-miya Kuniyoshi ō)	1873	1891		1929	father of Empress Kojun
3	Prince Kuni Asaakira (久邇宮 朝融王, Kuni-no-miya Asaakira ō)	1901	1929	1947	1959	
4	Kuni Kuniaki (久邇 邦昭)	1929	1959			

=== Kaya-no-miya ===
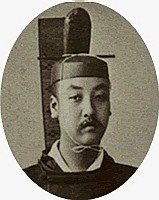
Prince Kaya Kuninori (1867-1909), 1st chapter of the house of Kaya-no-miya

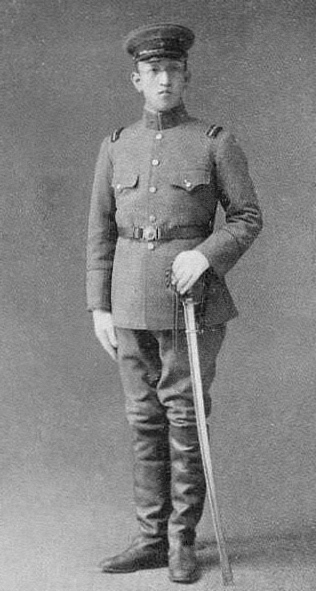
Prince Kaya Tsunenori (1900-1978), 2nd head of the house of Kaya-no-miya

The Kaya-no-miya house was formed by Prince Kuninori, second son of Prince Kuni Asahiko (first Kuni-no-miya, see above)

	Name	Born	Succeeded	Retired	Died	Notes
1	Prince Kaya Kuninori (賀陽宮 邦憲王, Kaya-no-miya Kuninori shinnō)	1867	1896		1909	Kaya-no-miya was a personal title until 1900
2	Prince Kaya Tsunenori (賀陽宮 恒憲王, Kaya-no-miya Tsunenori-ō)	1900	1909	1947	1978	Kaya Tsunenori after 1947
3	Kaya Kuninaga (賀陽 邦寿)	1922	1978		1986	politician; died without heirs.
4	Kaya Harunori (賀陽 治憲)	1926	1987		2011	brother of Kuninaga; career diplomat; died without heirs.
5	Kaya Masanori (賀陽 正憲)	1959	2011			nephew of Harunori through his younger brother Akinori; career diplomat; with male issue.

=== Asaka-no-miya ===
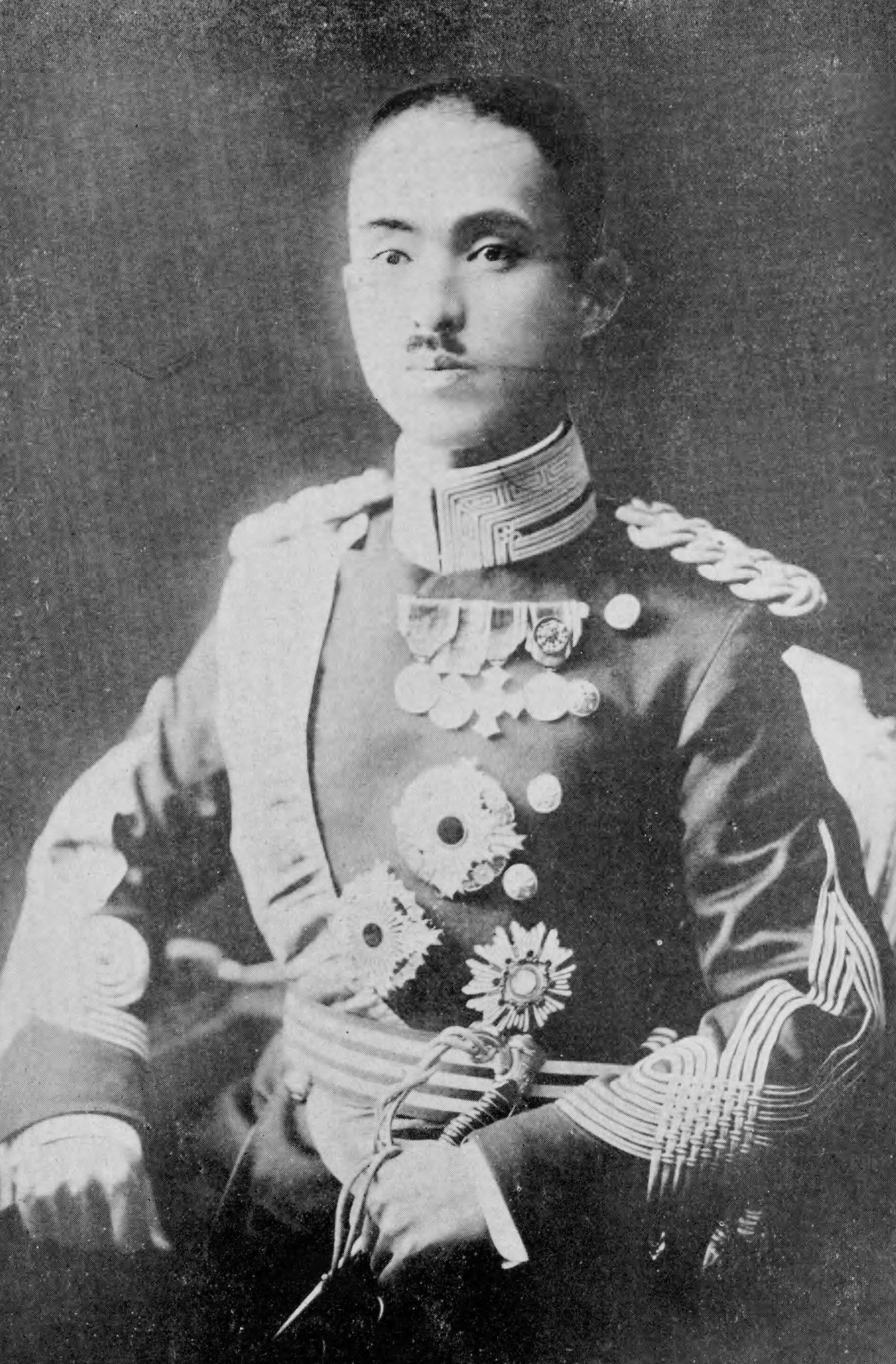
Prince Asaka Yasuhiko (1887-1981), 1st chapter of the house of Asaka-no-miya

The Asaka-no-miya house was formed by Prince Yasuhiko, eighth son of Prince Kuni Asahiko.

	Name	Born	Succeeded	Retired	Died	Notes
1	Prince Asaka Yasuhiko (朝香宮 鳩彦王, Asaka-no-miya Yasuhiko-ō)	1887	1906	1947	1981	
X	Asaka Takahiko (朝香 孚彦)	1912	1981		1994	
X	Asaka Tomohiko (朝香 誠彦)	1944	1994			

=== Higashikuni-no-miya ===
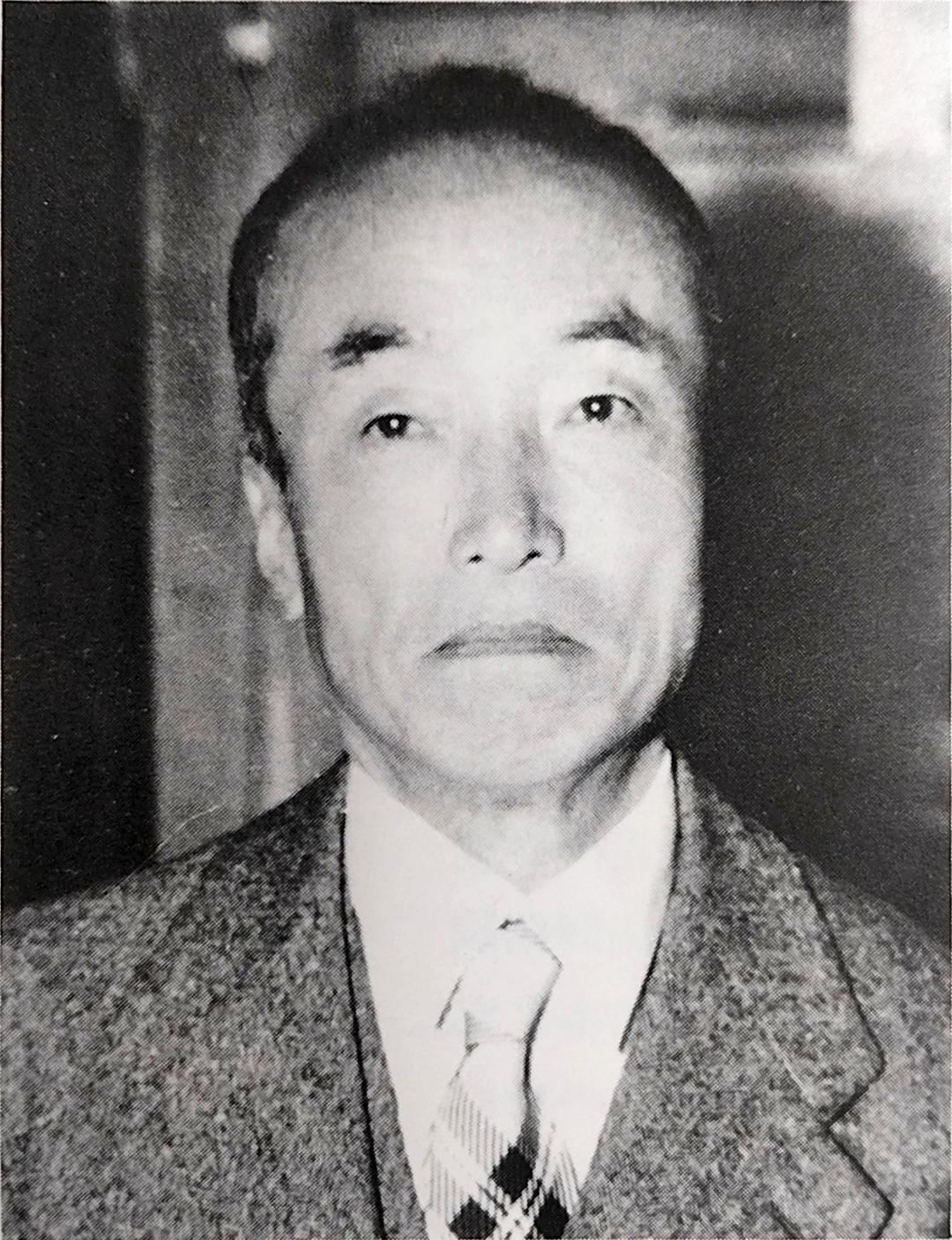
Prince Naruhiko Higashikuni (1887-1990), 1st head of the Higashikuni-no-miya house

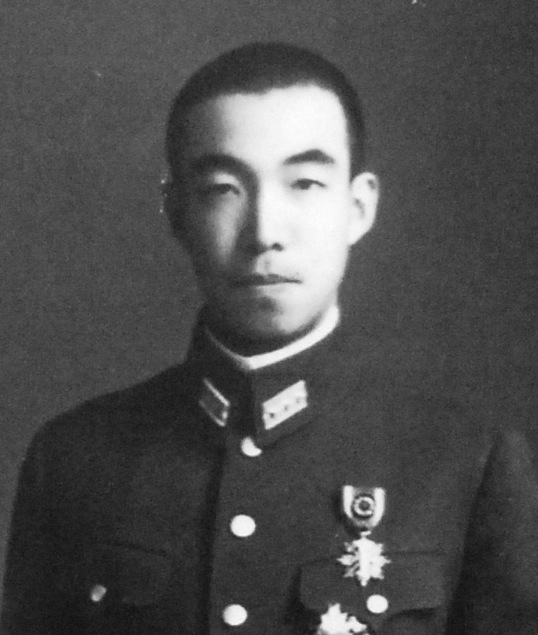
Higashikuni Morihiro (1917-1969), 2nd head of the Higashikuni-no-miya house

The Higashikuni-no-miya house was formed by Prince Naruhiko, ninth son of Prince Kuni Asahiko.

	Name	Born	Succeeded	Retired	Died	Notes
1	Prince Higashikuni Naruhiko (東久邇宮 稔彦王, Higashikuni-no-miya Naruhiko-ō)	1887	1906	1947	1990	Prime Minister of Japan (17 August 1945 – 9 October 1945)
X	Prince Higashikuni Morihiro (東久邇宮 盛厚王, Higashikuni no miya Morihiro ō)	1916	1947		1969	
2	Prince Higashikuni Nobuhiko (東久邇宮 信彦王, Higashikuni-no-miya Nobuhiko-ō)	1945	1990		2019	grandson of Naruhiko, son of Morihiro
X	Higashikuni Yukihiko (東久邇征彦, Higashikuni Yukihiko)	1973	2019			son of Nobuhiko

Prince Higashikuni Nobuhiko became simply "Higashikuni Nobuhiko" after the abolition of the Japanese aristocracy during the American occupation of Japan in 1947.

=== Higashifushimi-no-miya / Komatsu-no-miya ===
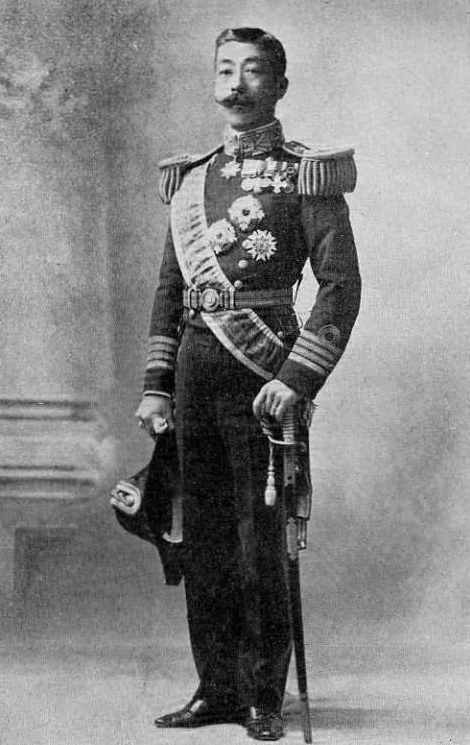
Prince Higashifushimi Yorihito (1867-1922)

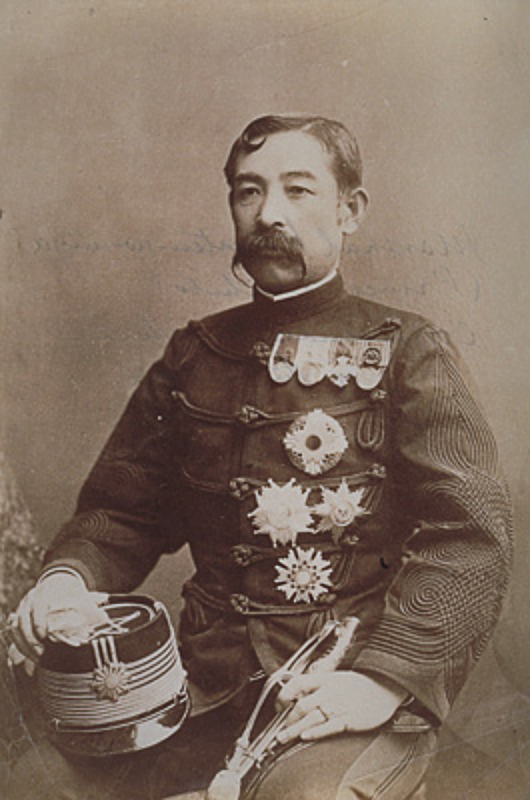
Prince Komatsu Akihito (1846-1903), 1st head of the Komatsu no Miya house

The Higashifushimi-no-miya or the Komatsu-no-miya house was formed by Prince Yoshiaki, seventh son of Prince Fushimi Kuniye.

	Name	Born	Succeeded	Retired	Died	Notes
1	Prince Higashifushimi Yoshiaki (東伏見宮 嘉彰親王, Higashifushimi no miya Yoshiaki-shinnō); Prince Komatsu Akihito (小松宮 彰仁親王, Komatsu-no-miya Akihito-shinnō)	1846	1867; 1872	1872	1903	changed name in 1872
2	Prince Higashifushimi Yorihito (東伏見宮 依仁親王, Higashifushimi no miya Yorihito-ō)	1876	1903		1922	brother of Akihito reverted name back to Higashifushimi

In 1931, Emperor Shōwa directed his brother-in-law, Prince Kuni Kunihide, to leave Imperial Family status and become Count Higashifushimi Kunihide (hakushaku under the kazoku peerage system), to prevent the Higashifushimi name from extinction. Dowager Princess Higashifushimi Kaneko became a commoner on 14 October 1947. She died in Tokyo in 1955.

=== Kitashirakawa-no-miya ===
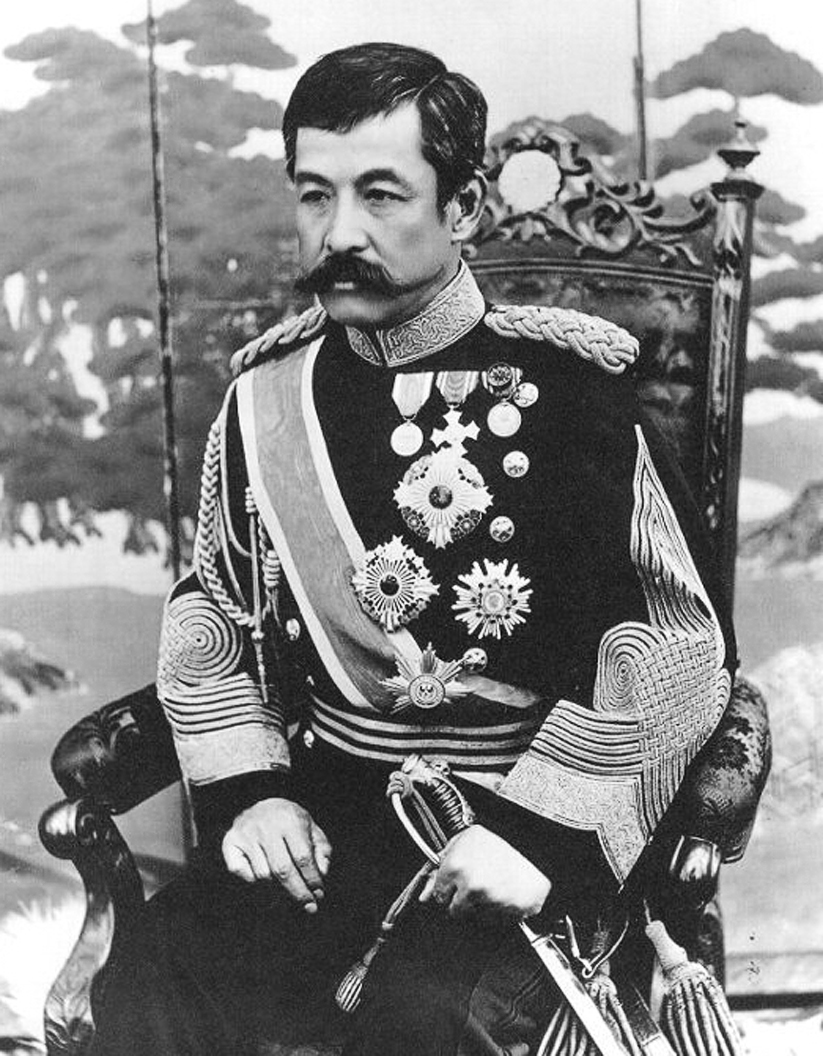
Prince Kitashirakawa Yoshihisa (1847-1895), 2nd head of the house of Kitashirakawa-no-miya

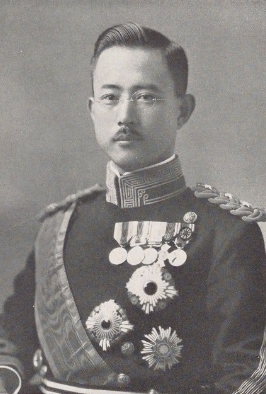
Prince Naruhisa Kitashirakawa (1887-1923), 3rd head of the house of Kitashirakawa-no-miya

The Kitashirakawa-no-miya house was formed by Prince Satonari, thirteenth son of Prince Fushimi Kuniye.

	Name	Born	Succeeded	Retired	Died	Notes
1	Prince Kitashirakawa Satonari (北白川宮 智成親王, Kitashirakawa-no-miya Satonari shinnō)	1844	1870		1872	
2	Prince Kitashirakawa Yoshihisa (北白川宮 能久親王, Kitashirakawa-no-miya Yoshihisa-shinnō)	1847	1872		1895	brother of above
3	Prince Kitashirakawa Naruhisa (北白川宮 成久王, Kitashirakawa-no-miya Naruhisa-ō)	1887	1895		1923	
4	Prince Kitashirakawa Nagahisa (北白川宮 永久王, Kitashirakawa-no-miya Nagahisa-ō)	1910	1923		1940	
5	Prince Kitashirakawa Michihisa (北白川宮 道久王, Kitashirakawa-no-miya Michihisa-ō)	1937	1940	1947	2018	Kitashirakawa Michihisa after 1947

The Kitashirakawa-no-miya became extinct with the death of Kitashirakawa Michihisa without heirs on 20 October 2018.

=== Takeda-no-miya ===
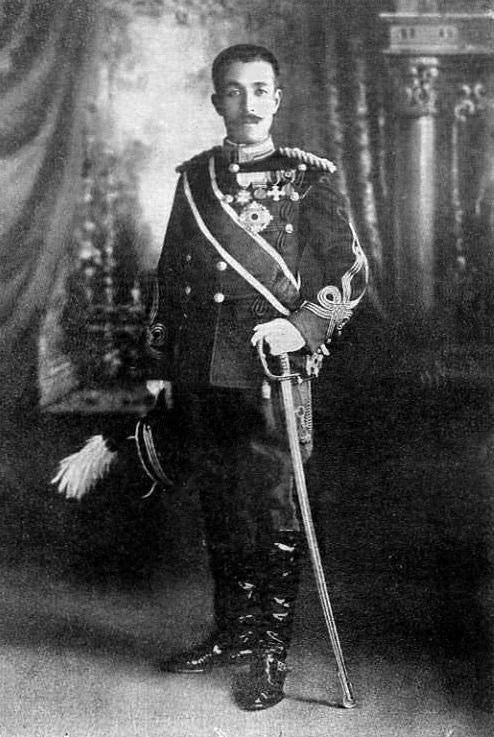
Prince Tsunehisa Takeda (1882-1919), 1st chapter of the house of Takeda-no-miya

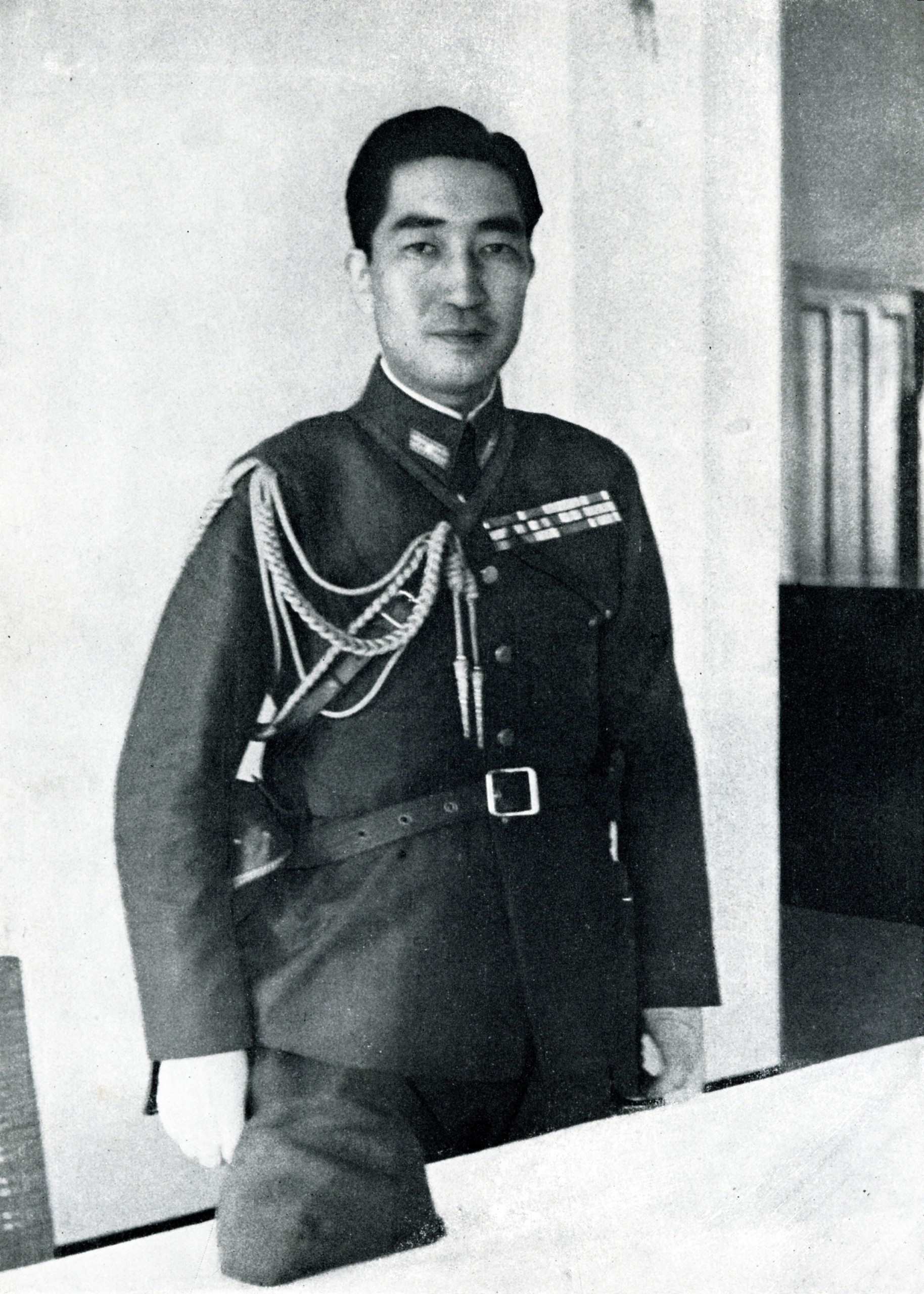
Prince Tsuneyoshi Takeda (1909-1992), 2nd chapter of the house of Takeda-no-miya

The Takeda-no-miya house was formed by Prince Tsunehisa, eldest son of Prince Kitashirakawa Yoshihisa (second Kitashirakawa-no-miya).

	Name	Born	Succeeded	Retired	Died	Notes
1	Prince Takeda Tsunehisa (竹田宮 恒久王, Takeda-no-miya Tsunehisa-ō)	1882	1906		1919	
2	Prince Takeda Tsuneyoshi (竹田宮 恒徳王, Takeda-no-miya Tsuneyoshi-ō)	1909	1919	1947	1992	
3	Prince Takeda Tsunetada (竹田 恒正, Takeda-no-miya Tsunetada-ō)	1940	1992			

=== Nashimoto-no-miya ===
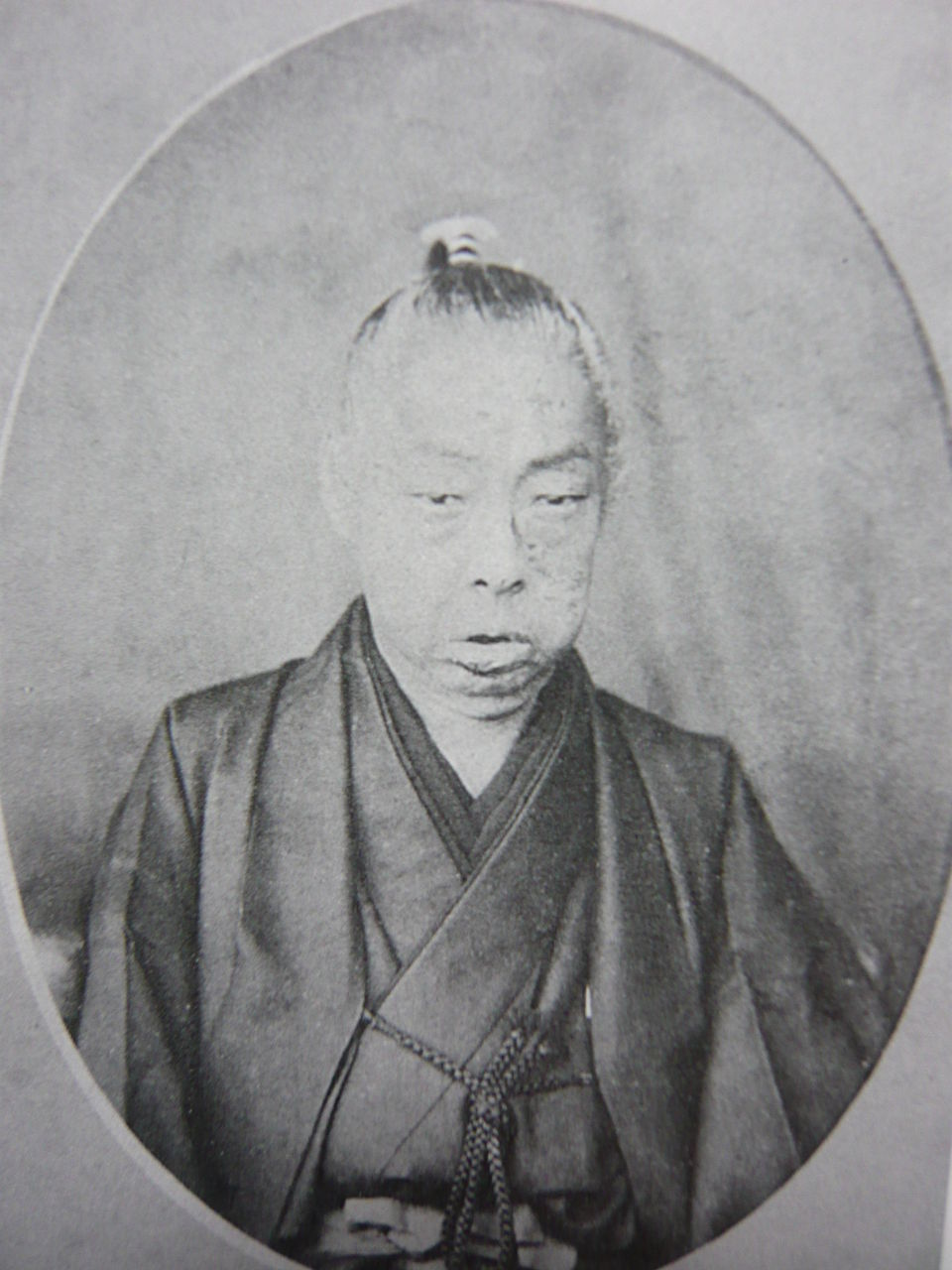
Prince Nashimoto Moriosa (1819—1885), 1st head of the Nashimoto-no-miya house

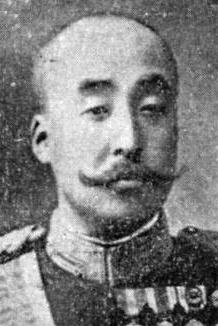
Prince Nashimoto Morimasa (1874—1951), 3rd head of the Nashimoto-no-miya house

The Nashimoto-no-miya house was formed by Prince Moriosa, son of Prince Fushimi Sadayoshi (father of Prince Fushimi Kuniye)

	Name	Born	Succeeded	Retired	Died	Notes
1	Prince Nashimoto Moriosa (梨本宮 守脩親王, Nashimoto-no-miya Moriosa-shinnō)	1819	1870		1885	
2	Prince Nashimoto Kikumaro (山階宮菊麿王, Nashimoto-no-miya Kikumaro-ō)	1873	1885	1885	1908	grand-nephew of Moriosa; resigned to return to the Yamashina household
3	Prince Nashimoto Morimasa (梨本宮守正王, Nashimoto-no-miya Morimasa-ō)	1874	1885	1947	1951	cousin of Kikumaro and fourth son of Kuni-no-miya Asahiko

== Proposal for reinstatement ==
In January 2005, Prime Minister Junichiro Koizumi set up a panel consisting of 10 experts from various fields to discuss the succession law and possible ways to ensure stable succession in the imperial family. At that point, no male heir had been born to the Imperial family in 40 years, prompting concerns that there wouldn't be anyone to succeed Crown Prince Naruhito after he became emperor. The panel recommended giving eligibility to females and their descendants, that the first child, regardless of sex, be given priority in ascension, and that female family members who marry commoners be allowed to retain their imperial family member status. Itsuo Sonobe, deputy chairman of the 10-member government panel and a former Supreme Court justice, said that one of the panel's main concerns had been to find a solution that would win the people's support.

Media opinion polls showed an overwhelming majority favoring the change, but the proposed revision was met with fierce opposition from conservatives, who held that the imperial dynasty, which had survived in an unbroken line stretching for nearly 2700 years, could not be dismissed and ended by a wave of deracinated modernity and uncaring recentism. They proposed instead that the government take recourse to ancient traditions under which such situations had been handled in the past. They pointed out that various branches of the old imperial family do still exist in Japan, and that the constitutional definition of the "imperial family" which prevails today was imposed by the occupying western forces as recently as 1947. They maintained that, rather than ending the ancient imperial dynasty, it would be more sensible and less radical to end the recent, western-imposed restrictions. Tsuneyasu Takeda, a member of the former Takeda-no-miya collateral house (nephew of the current family head Tsunetada Takeda and son of Tsunekazu Takeda) and author of a book entitled The Untold Truth of Imperial Family Members, proposed to maintain the male line by restoring the former princely houses or by allowing imperial family members to adopt males from those families. Although Takeda has written that such men should feel a responsibility to maintain the royal house, he said he would find it daunting if asked to play that role himself. According to Takeda, the heads of the former court families agreed in late 2004, just before Koizumi's advisory panel started its discussions, not to speak out on the issue and some of them told him to "not get involved in political issues". Opponents of the reinstatement of former collateral branches, like Liberal Democratic Party politician Yōichi Masuzoe, argued that it would favor members of families with tenuous blood links to long-ago emperors over contemporary female descendants of recent sovereigns.

During a series of hearings on the succession problem in early 2012, Yoshiko Sakurai and Akira Momochi, conservative members of the panel of experts, rejected proposals for female members of the imperial family to be allowed to retain their royal status after marriage and create new branches of the imperial family, and instead suggested revising the Imperial Household Law so that male descendants of former imperial families which renounced their royal status in 1947 be allowed to return to the imperial family as adoptees. Another proposal was to reinstate four of the former imperial families, a solution opposed by the government on the grounds that it would not enjoy public support. Government sources told the Yomiuri Shimbun in May 2012 that the suggestion to reinstate men from the former princely houses as imperial family members through adoption had been unexpected.

In September 2021, it was considered to amend the Imperial Household Law and allow the 85-year old Prince Hitachi to adopt a male member of the collateral branches of the imperial family.

== Bibliography ==
- Fujitani, T. Splendid Monarchy: Power and Pageantry in Modern Japan. University of California Press; Reprint edition (1998). ISBN 0-520-21371-8
- Lebra, Sugiyama Takie. Above the Clouds: Status Culture of the Modern Japanese Nobility. University of California Press (1995). ISBN 0-520-07602-8
