= Prince Yamashina Akira =

Japanese prince and diplomat (1816–1898)

Yamashina Akira 山階宮 晃親王
- Prince Yamashina Akira
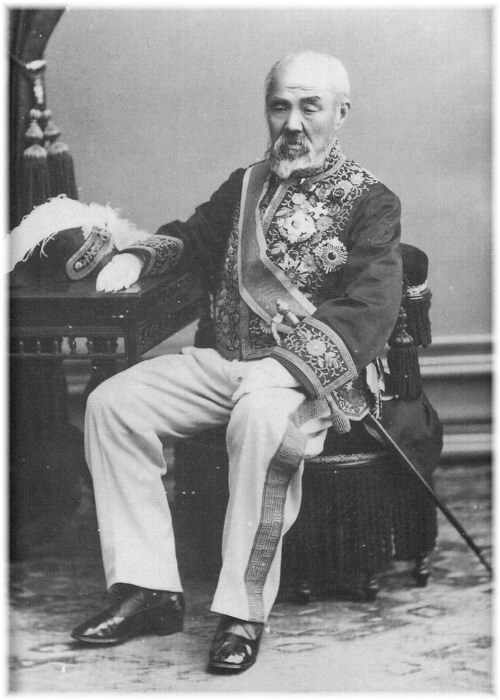

Prince Yamashina
- Reign: 24 February 1864 – 17 February 1898
- Successor: Prince Yamashina Kikumaro
- Born: 22 October 1816; Kyoto, Japan
- Died: 17 February 1898 (aged 81); Kyoto, Japan
- Issue: Prince Yamashina Kikumaro
- Father: Prince Fushimi Kuniye
- Mother: Fujiki Hisako

Prince Yamashina Akira (山階宮 晃親王, Yamashina-no-miya Akira shinnō) (22 October 1816 – 17 February 1898) was a Japanese diplomat, and the founder of the Yamashina collateral line of the Japanese imperial family.

== Early life ==
Prince Akira was born in Kyoto, the eldest son of Prince Fushimi Kuniie (1802–1872) and Fujigi Hisako (藤木寿子). Prince Kuniie was the twentieth head of the Fushimi-no-miya, the oldest of the four branches of the imperial dynasty allowed to provide a successor to the Chrysanthemum Throne should the main imperial house fail to produce an heir. Hisako was a Nyōbō, a rank of the prince's Lady-in-waiting. Soon after his birth, he was regarded as the ninth son of his grandfather, Prince Asahiko, though this adoption was annulled far later in 1889 and he became his father's eldest son again.

It was not until 1835 that Prince Kuniie officially married Takatsukasa Hiroko (鷹司景子), and they had two sons, Sadanori and Sadanaru; this made Prince Akira unable to succeed the Fushimi-no-miya. He was thus also a half-brother of Prince Kuni Asahiko, Prince Kitashirakawa Yoshihisa, and Prince Kan'in Kotohito.

== Buddhist priest ==
From an early age, Prince Akira was groomed to pursue a career as a Buddhist priest, the traditional career path for non-heir sons in the Shinnōke during the Edo period. At the age of two, he was officially adopted by Emperor Kōkaku (1779–1817;, died in 1840) as a potential heir.

Prince Akira took the tonsure and entered the priesthood under the title Saihan Hoshinnō. He was later appointed prince-abbot of the monzeki temple of Kajū-ji in Yamashina, outside of Kyoto. In 1842, he angered the Tokugawa bakufu, which stripped him of his post and confined him to the temple of Tō-ji. In 1858, the Tokugawa government reinstated him to his former post. However, with the growing movement to overthrow the Tokugawa government in the years leading up to the Meiji Restoration, Emperor Kōmei returned him to secular status, adopted him as a potential heir, and created the title "Yamashina-no-miya" as a new branch of the Imperial house in 1864.

== Meiji period ==
After the Meiji restoration, Prince Yamashina served the new Meiji government as a diplomat, assisting in the opening of Kobe to foreign trade, and meeting with foreign dignitaries and royalty. He was one of the few Imperial princes to refuse a military commission, remaining a civilian all his life.

== Marriage and family ==
Prince Yamashina Akira never officially married, but he had a least one concubine, Nakajō Chieko (中條千枝子).

A son, Prince Yamashina Kikumaro (3 July 1873 – 2 May 1908) was born to Prince Yamashina Akira and Nakajō Chieko. Kikumaro was officially adopted to carry on the Yamashina line.
