= Nashimoto-no-miya =

Extinct branch of Japanese imperial family

Nashimoto
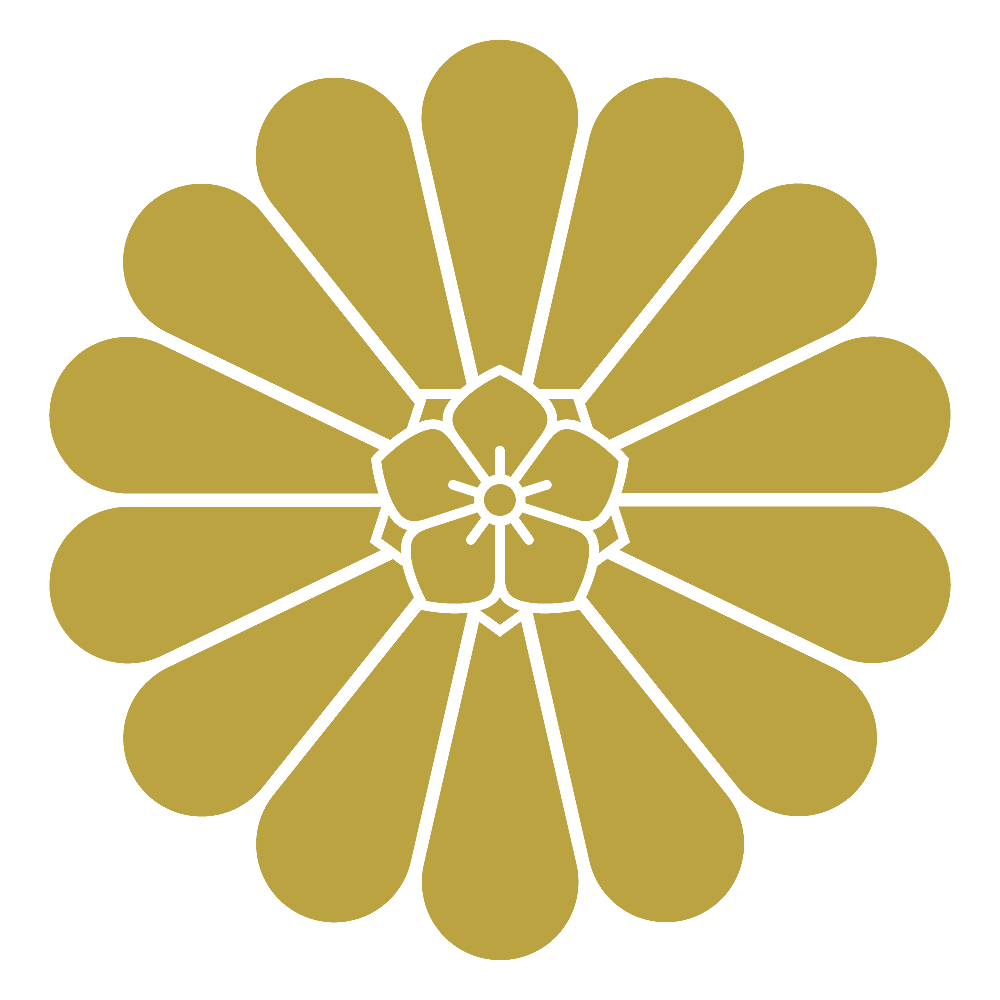
- Pronunciation: Nashimoto

Origin
- Origin: Japanese
- Region of origin: Japan

The Nashimoto (梨本宮, Nashimoto-no-miya) (princely house) was the oldest collateral branch (ōke) of the Japanese imperial family created from the Fushimi-no-miya, the oldest of the four branches of the imperial dynasty allowed to provide a successor to the Chrysanthemum Throne should the main imperial line fail to produce an heir.

The Yamashina-no-miya house was formed in 1870 by Prince Moriosa, the 10th son of Prince Fushimi Sadayoshi, who was given his title by Emperor Meiji. As Prince Moriosa was childless, the title passed briefly first to his grandnephew Prince Kikumaro, then to Prince Morimasa, the fourth son of Prince Kuni Asahiko. Princess Masako, the eldest daughter of Prince Morimasa, was married to Crown Prince Euimin of Korea.

On October 14, 1947, Prince Nashimoto Morimasa lost his imperial status and became an ordinary citizen, as part of the American Occupation's abolition of the collateral branches of the Japanese Imperial family. On his death without male heirs in 1951, the main line of the Nashimoto-no-miya became extinct.

The Nashimoto-no-miya palace was located in the Aoyama district of Shibuya, Tokyo.

	Name	Born	Succeeded	Retired	Died	Notes
1	Prince Nashimoto Moriosa (梨本宮 守脩親王, Nashi-no-miya Moriosa-shinnō)	1819	1870	.	1885	
2	Prince Nashimoto Kikumaro (山階宮菊麿王, Nashimoto-no-miya Kikumaro-ō)	1873	1885	1885	1908	grand-nephew of Moriosa; resigned to return to the Yamashina household
3	Prince Nashimoto Morimasa (梨本宮守正王, Nashimoto-no-miya Morimasa-ō)	1874	1885	1947	1951	cousin of Kikumaro and fourth son of Kuni-no-miya Asahiko
