= Kaya-no-miya =

Collateral branch (ōke) of the Japanese Imperial Family

Kaya
- Pronunciation: Kaya

Origin
- Origin: Japanese
- Region of origin: Japan

The Kaya (賀陽宮, Kaya-no-miya) (princely house) was the seventh oldest collateral branch (ōke) of the Japanese Imperial Family created from the Fushimi-no-miya, the oldest of the four branches of the imperial dynasty allowed to provide a successor to the Chrysanthemum Throne should the main imperial line fail to produce an heir.

The Kaya-no-miya house was formed in 1892 as an ad personam title for Prince Kuninori, the second son of Prince Kuni Asahiko. Emperor Meiji authorized it to become an independent ōke household in 1900.

On October 14, 1947, Prince Kaya Tsunenori and his family lost their imperial status and became ordinary citizens, as part of the American Occupation's abolition of the collateral branches of the Japanese Imperial family. The direct line of the Kaya-no-miya house ended with the death of Prince Kaya Tsunenori’s eldest son, prince Kaya Kuninaga in 1986. However, the Kaya family line continues through the children of Prince Kaya Tsunenori’s third son, Kaya Akinori.

The Kaya-no-miya palace was located in the Chiyoda district of Tokyo. The site is now occupied by the Chidorigafuchi National Cemetery.

	Name	Born	Succeeded	Retired	Died	Notes
1	Prince Kaya Kuninori (賀陽宮 邦憲王, Kaya-no-miya Kuninori shinnō)	1867	1896	.	1909	Kaya-no-miya was a personal title until 1900
2	Prince Kaya Tsunenori (賀陽宮 恒憲王, Kaya-no-miya Tsunenori-ō)	1900	1909	1947	1978	Kaya Tsunenori after 1947
3	Kaya Kuninaga (賀陽邦寿)	1922	1978	.	1986	politician; died without heirs
4	Kaya Harunori (賀陽 治憲)	1926	1987	.	2011	brother of Kuninaga; career diplomat; died without heirs
5	Kaya Masanori (賀陽 正憲)	1959	2011	.	.	nephew of Harunori through his younger brother Akinori; career diplomat
