= Prince Fushimi Sadanaru =

Japanese prince and field marshal (1858–1923)

His Imperial Highness Sadanaru Prince Fushimi
- 伏見宮 貞愛親王
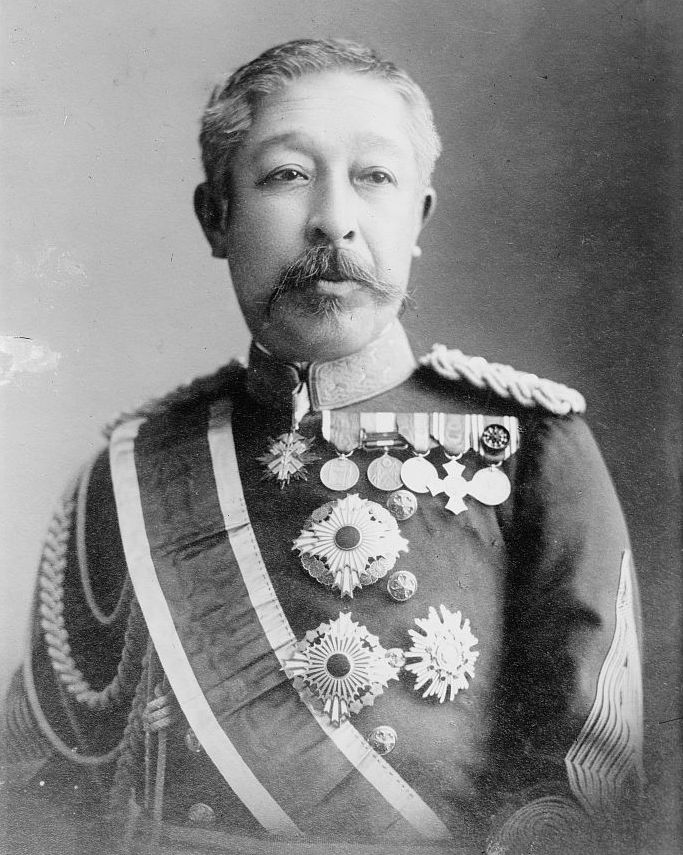
- Sadanaru, c. 1910–1915

Lord Keeper of the Privy Seal
- In office 21 December 1912 – 13 January 1915
- Monarch: Taishō
- Preceded by: Katsura Tarō
- Succeeded by: Ōyama Iwao

Member of the Supreme War Council
- In office 19 January 1905 – 9 January 1915
- Monarchs: Meiji; Taishō

Personal details
- Born: 9 June 1858 Kyoto, Yamashiro, Japan
- Died: 4 February 1923 (aged 64) Cape Inubō, Chiba, Japan
- Awards: Supreme Order of the Chrysanthemum; Order of the Golden Kite (2nd Class)

Military service
- Allegiance: Empire of Japan
- Branch/service: Imperial Japanese Army
- Years of service: 1875–1923
- Rank: Field Marshal
- Commands: IJA 4th Division, IJA 1st Division, IJA 10th Division
- Battles/wars: First Sino-Japanese War; Russo-Japanese War

Prince Fushimi
- Reign: 17 January 1863 – 17 March 1864
- Predecessor: Prince Fushimi Sadanori
- Successor: Prince Fushimi Kuniie
- Reign: 16 May 1872 – 4 February 1923
- Predecessor: Prince Fushimi Kuniie
- Successor: Prince Fushimi Hiroyasu
- Spouse: Princess Arisugawa Toshiko
- Father: Prince Fushimi Kuniie; Emperor Kōmei (adoptive father)

Sadanaru, Prince Fushimi (伏見宮貞愛親王, Fushimi-no-miya Sadanaru-Shinnō; 9 June 1858 – 4 February 1923) was the 22nd head of the Fushimi-no-miya shinnōke (branch of the Imperial Family). He was a field marshal in the Imperial Japanese Army.

== Early life ==
Prince Sadanaru was born in Kyoto as the fourteenth son of Prince Fushimi Kuniie (1802–1875) and the second son of Princess Takatsukasa Hiroko; he was thus the half brother of Prince Yamashina Akira, Prince Kuni Asahiko, Prince Kitashirakawa Yoshihisa, and Prince Kan'in Kotohito. He succeeded his father as the head of the Fushimi-no-miya family in 1875.

== Marriage and family ==
In 1872, Prince Fushimi Sadanaru married Princess Arisugawa Toshiko (1858–1927), the daughter of Prince Arisugawa Takahito, with whom he had two sons (Kunika and Akinori). Two concubines bore Prince Hiroyasu and Princess Sachiko respectively.

1. Prince Fushimi Hiroyasu (博恭王, Hiroyasu-ō; 16 October 1875 – 16 August 1946).
2. Prince Fushimi Kunika (邦芳王, Kunika-ō; 1880–1933). Had "incurable diseases and died unmarried and without issue.
3. Prince Fushimi Akinori (昭徳王, Akinori-ō; 1881–1883)
4. Princess Fushimi Sachiko (禎子女王, Sachiko Joō; 1885–1966); married Count Toyokage Yamauchi.

Prince Kunika would become the legitimate heir to his father, but, due to his illness, Fushimi-no-miya was eventually succeeded by his elder half-brother, Prince Hiroyasu.

== Career ==
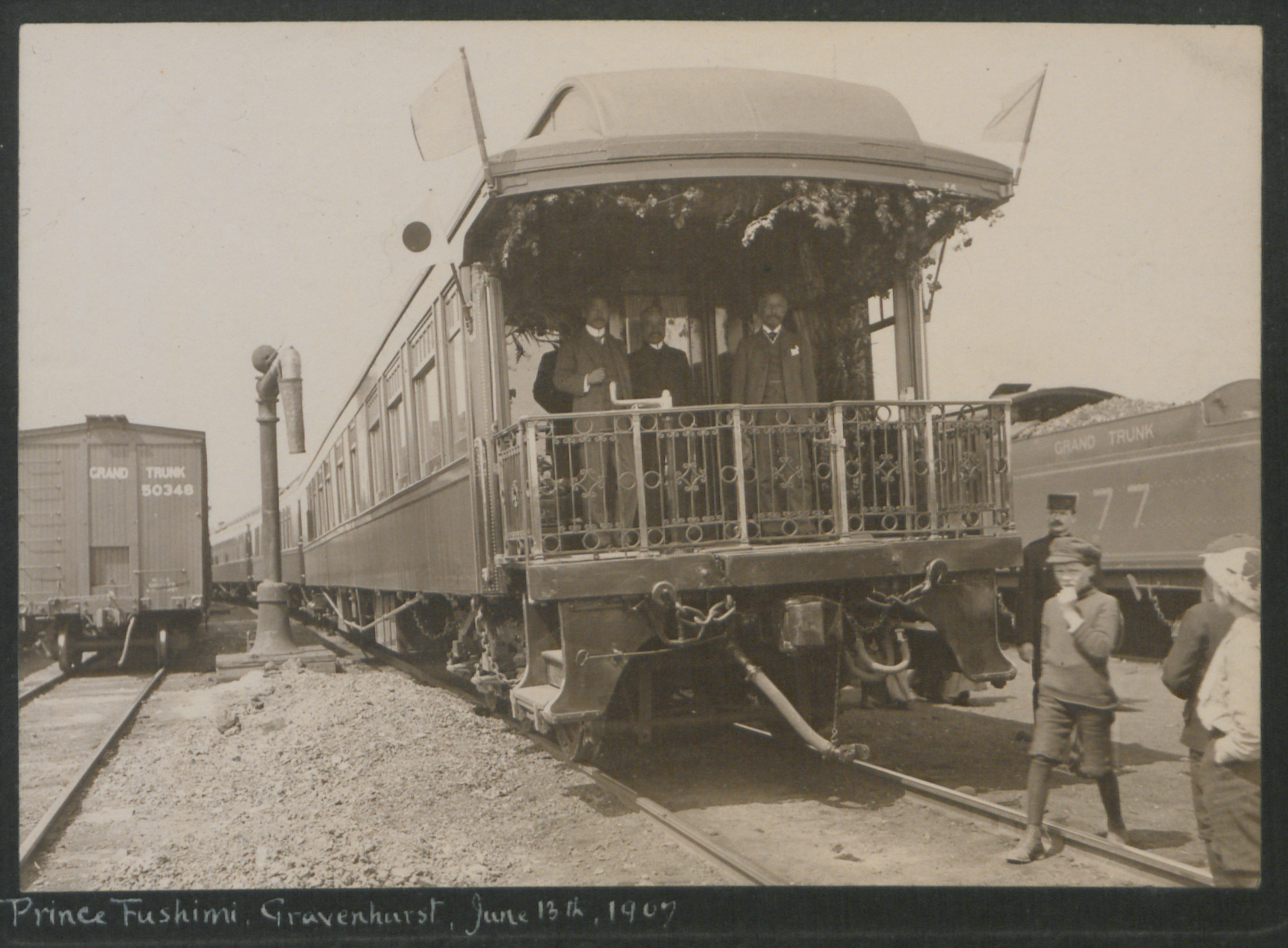
Prince Fushimi visiting Canada, 1907.

A career army officer, Prince Sadanaru entered the military academy in 1873 and fought as a lieutenant in the Satsuma Rebellion. Promoted to captain in 1878, he studied military tactics at the École Spéciale Militaire de Saint-Cyr in France and later in Germany in the 1870s. Upon his return to Japan, he was promoted to major in 1881 and advocated the establishment of a Japanese version of an army General Staff based on the Prussian model. He was promoted to lieutenant colonel in 1884, colonel in 1887 and to major general in 1889. He was awarded the Grand Cordon of the Order of the Chrysanthemum in 1886.

Major General Prince Fushimi Sadanaru served as a field commander in the First Sino-Japanese War (1894–1895), commanding the IJA 4th Division, and landing with his forces in the Liaodong Peninsula, China in 1894. He subsequently participated in the 1895 Japanese invasion of Taiwan.

He represented Emperor Meiji at the coronation of Tsar Nicholas II of Russia on 26 May 1896. In 1898, he was promoted to lieutenant general and assigned command of the Himeji-based IJA 10th Division. In 1901, he became commander of the IJA 1st Division.

In 1904, with the start of the Russo-Japanese War he again landed with his forces in the Liaodong Peninsula. In June, he was promoted to full general, and recalled to Japan to serve on the Supreme War Council, before being sent by Emperor Meiji on a diplomatic mission to the United States. After the conclusion of the Treaty of Portsmouth, he was sent to England again on a mission of thanks from the Japanese government for British advice and assistance during the war. During this mission, he also stopped in Honolulu for a visit with the Japanese community there. In 1909, he was again sent on a diplomatic mission, this time to China. Prince Fushimi also represented Japan at the state funeral of Great Britain's King Edward VII 20 May 1910. He met with the new King George V at Buckingham Palace.

Prince Fushimi was a close advisor to then-Crown Prince Yoshihito (later Emperor Taishō). After the death of Emperor Meiji in 1912, he served as Lord Keeper of the Privy Seal of Japan from 1912 to 1915, thus becoming the only imperial prince to have served in that office.

He was promoted to the largely ceremonial rank of field marshal in 1915, and awarded the Grand Collar of the Supreme Order of the Chrysanthemum in 1916.

== Death ==
The Prince died of influenza on 5 February 1923, at his vacation home in Cape Inubō and was accorded a state funeral. Dowager Princess Fushimi Toshiko died on 24 October 1927. He was succeeded by his son, Fleet Admiral Prince Fushimi Hiroyasu.

== Honors ==
His Japanese decorations include the Collar and Grand Cordon of the Supreme Order of the Chrysanthemum, Grand Cordon of the Order of the Rising Sun with Paulownia Flowers, Grand Cordon of the Order of the Sacred Treasure, Order of the Golden Kite (2nd Class). In addition, other honors and decorations included:

- Kingdom of Hawaii: Grand Cross of the Order of Kamehameha I, 27 April 1883
- German Empire: Grand Cross of the Red Eagle, 18 September 1886
- Kingdom of Italy:
  - Grand Cross of Saints Maurice and Lazarus, 18 September 1886
  - Knight of the Annunciation, 3 May 1910
- Austria-Hungary: Grand Cross of the Imperial Order of Leopold, 18 September 1886
- Sweden-Norway: Grand Cross of St. Olav, 1 July 1886
- Belgium: Grand Cordon of the Royal Order of Leopold, 5 October 1886
- Denmark: Grand Cross of the Dannebrog, 7 October 1886
- Russian Empire:
  - Knight of St. Alexander Nevsky, 25 May 1896
  - Knight of St. Andrew, 4 June 1910
- France: Grand Cross of the Legion of Honour, 16 April 1897
- Qing dynasty: Order of the Double Dragon, Class I Grade II, 27 November 1904; Class I Grade I, 27 April 1909
- United Kingdom: Honorary Grand Cross of the Bath (military), 1907

== Gallery ==
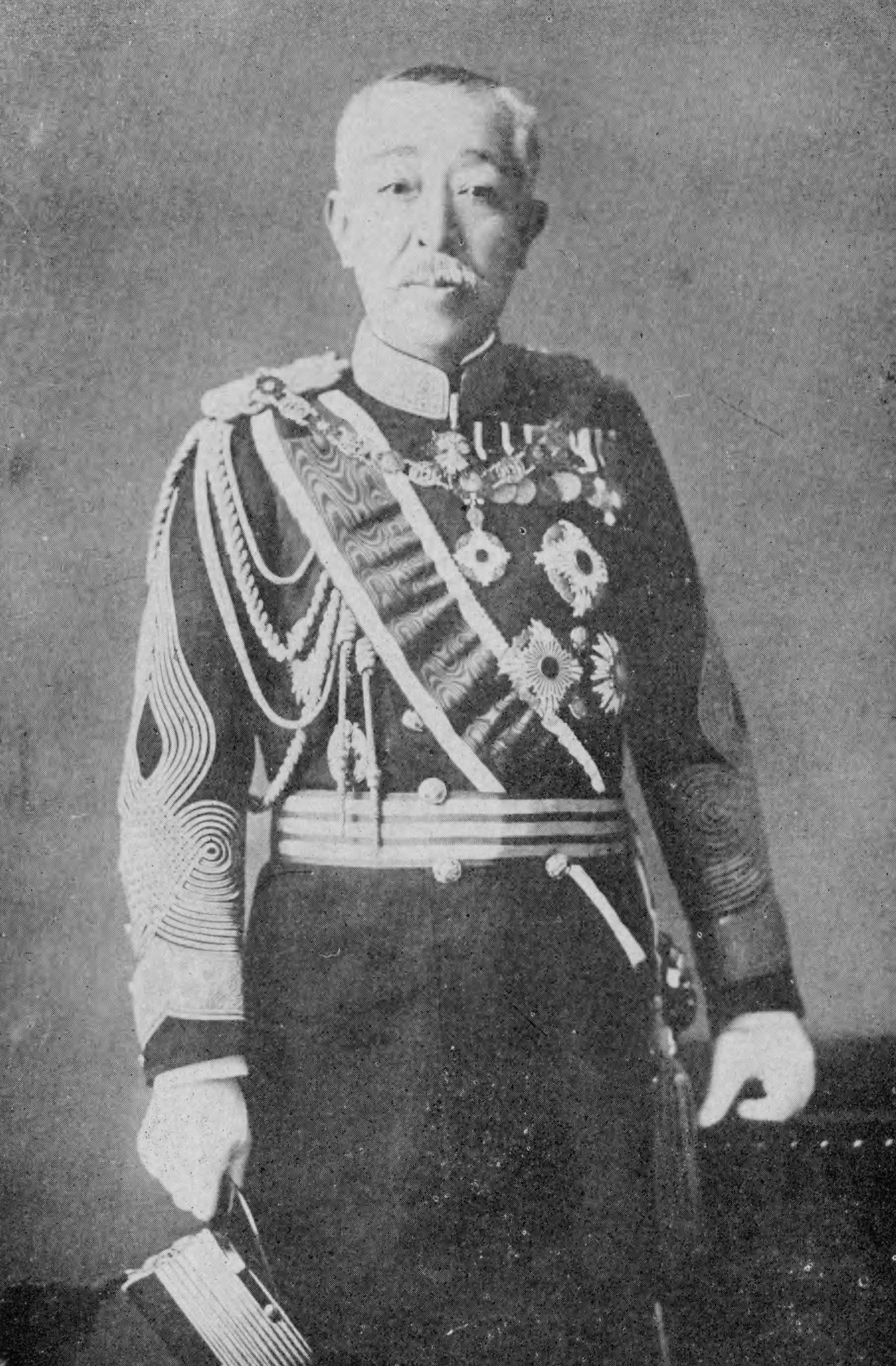
HIH Fushimi Sadanaru in 1918

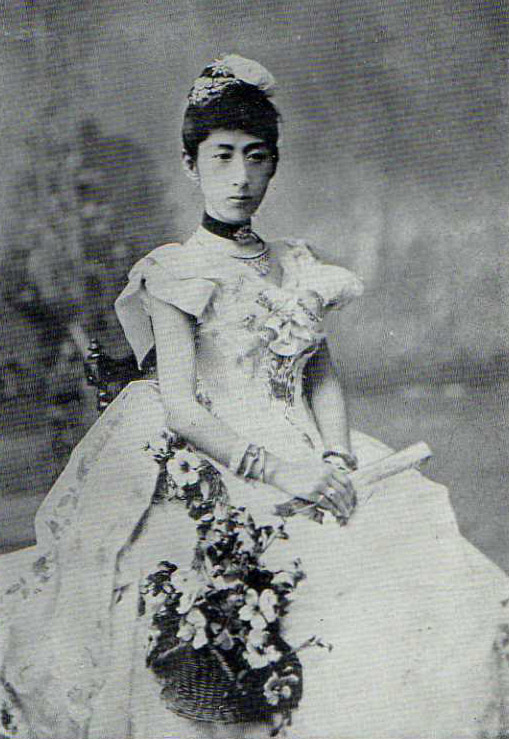
HIH Fushimi Toshiko

== Ancestry ==
Ancestors of Prince Fushimi Sadanaru

16. Prince Fushimi Sadatake (1701-1754)
8. Prince Fushimi Kuniyori (1733-1802)
4. Prince Fushimi Sadayoshi (1776-1841)
2. Prince Fushimi Kuniie (1802-1872)
1. Prince Fushimi Sadanaru
24. Prince Kan'in Naohito (1704-1753)
12. Takatsukasa Sukehira (1739-1813)
25. Nakano Sachi
6. Takatsukasa Masahiro (1761-1841)
3. Princess Fushimi Hiroko, née Takatsukasa (1814-1892)
