= Prince Yamashina Takehiko =

Japanese Navy officer (1898–1987)

Yamashina Takehiko 山階宮 武彦王
- Prince Yamashina Takehiko
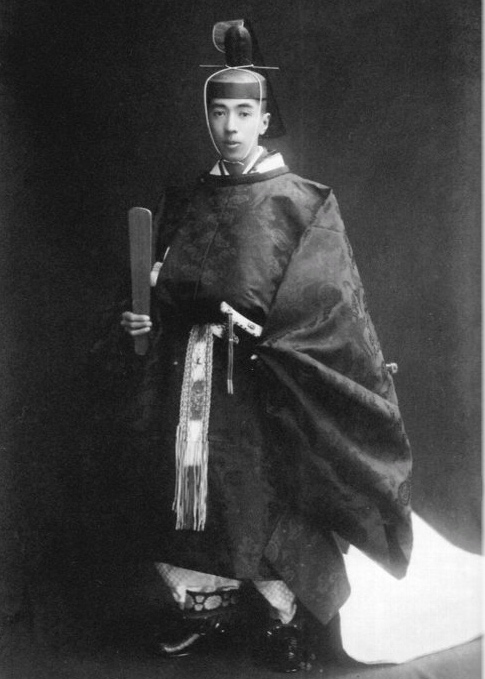
- Born: 3 February 1898; Tokyo, Japan
- Died: 10 August 1987 (aged 89); Fujisawa, Kanagawa, Japan
- Spouse: Princess Kaya Sakiko
- Father: Prince Yamashina Kikumaro
- Military career
- Allegiance: Japan
- Branch: Imperial Japanese Navy
- Service years: 1918–1932
- Rank: Lieutenant-Commander
- Units: Imperial Japanese Navy Aviation Bureau; Imperial Japanese Navy General Staff
- Conflicts: First World War

Prince Yamashina Takehiko (山階宮 武彦王, Yamashina-no-miya Takehiko-ō; 13 February 1898 – 10 August 1987), was the third (and final) head of the Yamashina-no-miya, a collateral line of the Japanese imperial family. He was nicknamed "the Flying Prince".

== Early life ==
Prince Yamashina Takehiko was the son and eldest child of Prince Yamashina Kikumaro by his first wife, the former Kujō Noriko. He succeeded his father as the third head of the Yamashina-no-miya house on 2 May 1908, after his father's sudden and untimely death.

== Military career ==
Prince Yamashina Takehiko graduated from the 46th class of the Imperial Japanese Naval Academy in 1918 ranked 1st in his class of 126 cadets. He served his midshipman duty on the battleship Kirishima. After graduating from naval artillery and torpedo warfare schools, he joined the Imperial Japanese Navy Aviation Bureau as a sub-lieutenant in 1921. Prince Yamashina was a naval aviation enthusiast and helped establish a private aviation institute, the Mikuni Aviation School. He rose to the rank of lieutenant and was attached to the Imperial Japanese Navy General Staff. Prince Yamashina retired from active service in 1927 because of declining health (he allegedly had a nervous breakdown). He was promoted to the rank of lieutenant commander in 1929 and placed on the waiting list. Prince Yamashina Takehiko retired from public life in 1932.

Prince Yamashina lost his status as a member of Imperial Family with the abolition of the imperial branch families by the American occupation authorities on 14 October 1947.

== Marriage ==
In 1922, Prince Yamashina Takehiko married Princess Kaya Sakiko, the daughter of Prince Kaya Kuninori. Princess Sakiko was killed on 1 September 1923 during the Great Kantō earthquake, when their house in Yuigahama, Kamakura, collapsed on top of her, killing her and her unborn child named Prince Yamashina Taha (山階宮他派王, Yamashina-no-miya Taha-ō). The death of his wife severely affected Prince Yamashina, and he suffered from severe depression for years afterwards. He never remarried, and the direct Yamashina line became extinct with his death in Tokyo on 10 August 1987.
