= Prince Yamashina Kikumaro =

Yamashina Kikumaro 山階宮 菊麿王
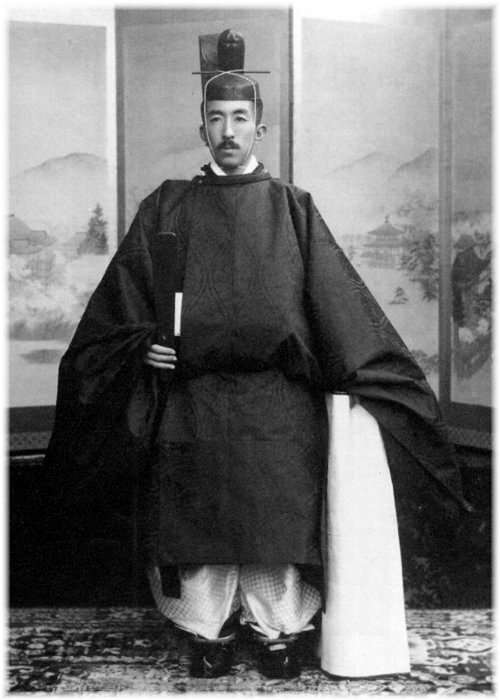

Prince Nashimoto
- Reign: 20 October 1881 – 2 December 1885
- Predecessor: Prince Nashimoto Moriosa
- Successor: Prince Nashimoto Morimasa

Prince Yamashina
- Reign: 17 February 1898 – 2 May 1908
- Predecessor: Prince Yamashina Akira
- Successor: Takehiko Yamashina
- Born: 3 July 1873; Kyoto, Japan
- Died: 2 May 1908 (aged 34); Tokyo, Japan
- Spouse: Princess Kujō Noriko; Princess Shimazu Hisako
- Issue: 6, including Prince Yamashina Takehiko; Yamashina Yoshimaro
- Father: Prince Yamashina Akira; Prince Nashimoto Moriosa (adoptive father)
- Mother: Nakajō Chieko

Prince Yamashina Kikumaro (山階宮 菊麿王, Yamashina-no-miya Kikumaro-ō; 3 July 1873 – 2 May 1908), was the second head of the Yamashina-no-miya, a collateral line of the Japanese imperial family.

== Early life ==
Prince Yamashina Kikumaro was the son of Prince Yamashina Akira. His mother was a concubine, Nakajo Chieko, but as Prince Akira had no children by his official wife, Princess Katsura Sumiko (the half-sister of Emperor Kōmei), Kikumaro was adopted as his official heir.

However, in 1874, he was adopted by Prince Nashimoto Moriosa to carry on the Nashimoto line. However, following Prince Moriosa's death, the Nashimoto line passed to Prince Kuni Morimasa, and Prince Kikumaro was able to return as heir to the Yamashina line. On 17 February 1898, he succeeded his father as the second head of the Yamashina-no-miya house.

== Military career ==
Prince Kikumaro attended the Imperial Japanese Naval Academy in 1885. He was then sent to Germany and enrolled in the Naval Academy of the Kaiserliche Marine on 9 April 1890. By 1893, he received a commission as a sub-lieutenant. In September 1894, Prince Kikumaro graduated from the academy and returned to Japan.

He served his midshipman duties on the Iwate, followed by a tour of duty aboard the Yakumo from 1902. He served in combat with distinction during the Russo-Japanese War, and was awarded the Order of the Golden Kite (4th class). By 1905, he was promoted to the rank of captain. He entered the Naval Staff College in January 1908, but died suddenly four months later at the young age of 34.

== Marriage and family ==
On 14 September 1895, Prince Kikumaro married Kujō Noriko (4 December 1878 – 11 November 1901), a daughter of Prince Kujō Michitaka. Prince and Princess Yamashina had two sons and a daughter:

1. Prince Yamashina Takehiko (13 February 1898 – 10 August 1987)
2. Marquis Yamashina Yoshimaro (5 July 1900 – 29 January 1989)
3. Marchioness Asano Yasuko (31 October 1901 – 29 December 1974)

On 26 November 1902, the widowed Prince Kikumaro married Shimazu Hisako (7 February 1874 – 26 February 1938), daughter of Prince Shimazu Tadayoshi. Prince Kikumaro and his second wife had three sons:

1. Marquis Tsukuba Fujimaro (7 February 1905 – 20 March 1978)
2. Count Kashima Hagimaro (21 April 1906 – 26 August 1932)
3. Count Katsuragi Shigemaro (29 April 1908 – 10 January 1947)

== Gallery ==
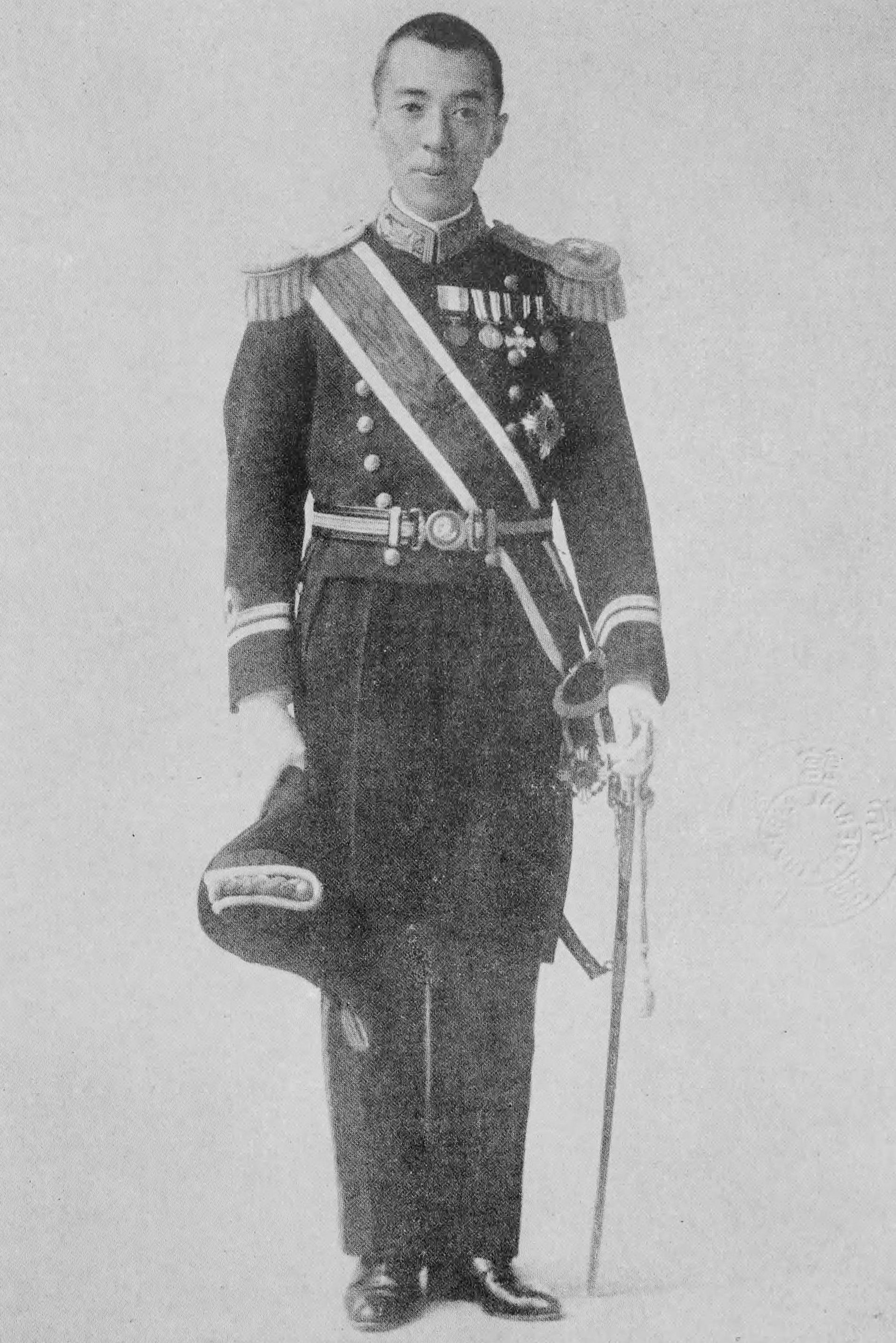
Eldest son and heir, Yamashina Takehito

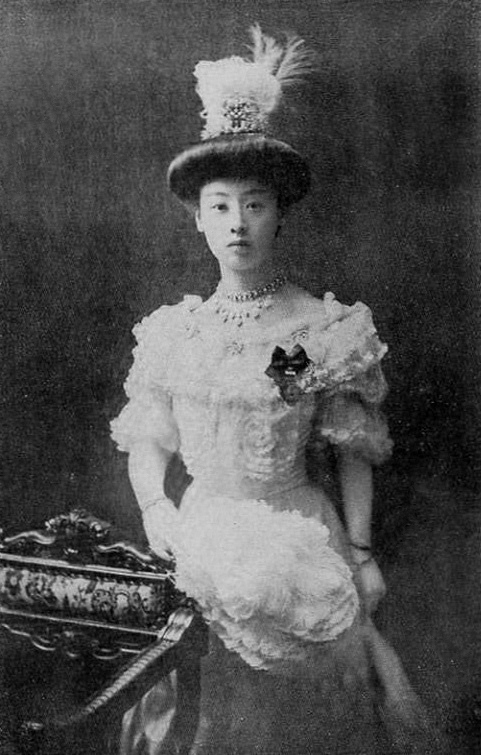
Yamashina Hisako, second wife

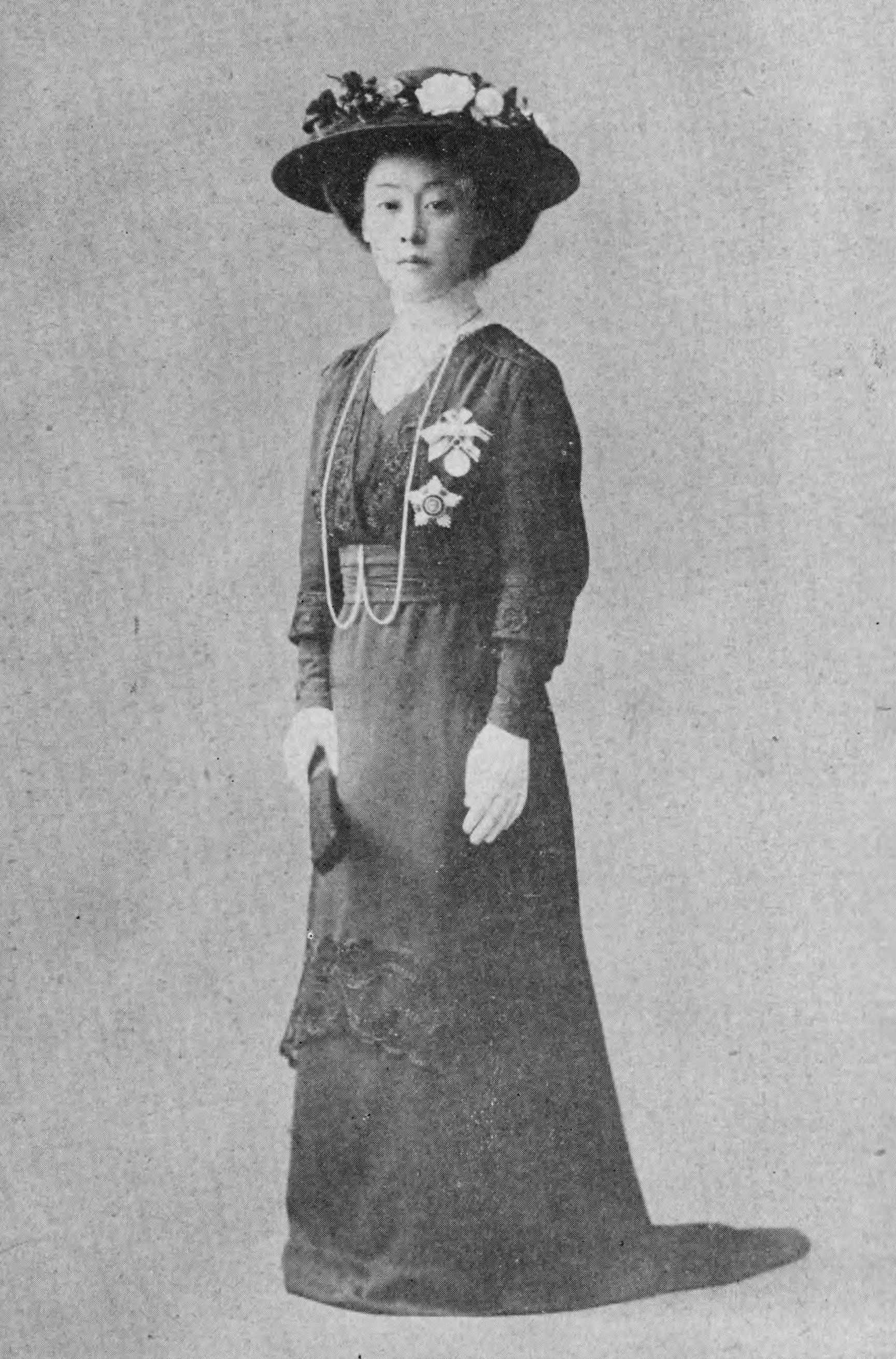
Yamashina Hisako, another photo

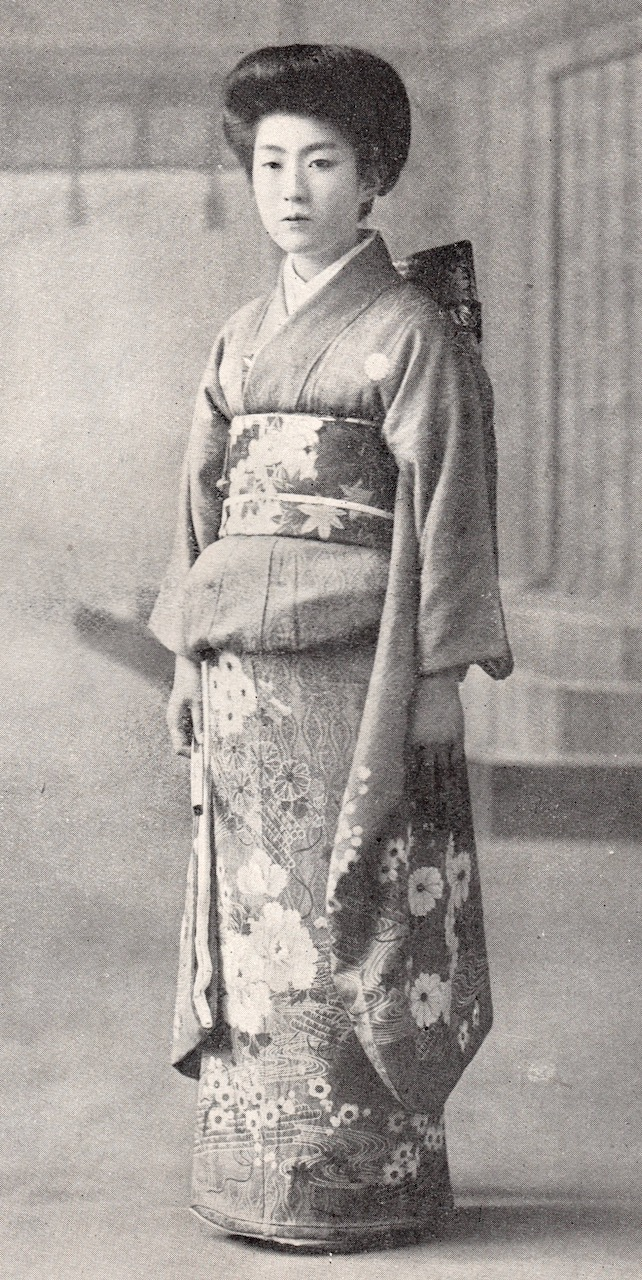
Yamashina Yasuko, daughter by first wife
