= Prince Fushimi Kuniie =

Japanese royal (1802–1872)

Kuniie
- Prince Fushimi
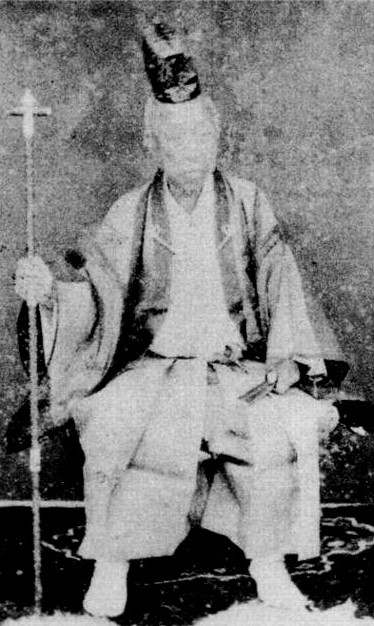

Prince Fushimi
- Reign: 12 February 1841 – 1 October 1842
- Predecessor: Prince Fushimi Sadayuki
- Successor: Prince Fushimi Sadanori
- Reign: 18 March 1864 – 16 May 1872
- Predecessor: Prince Fushimi Sadanaru
- Successor: Prince Fushimi Sadanaru
- Born: 24 October 1802; Kyoto, Japan
- Died: 5 August 1872 (aged 69); Tokyo, Japan
- Father: Prince Fushimi Sadayuki; Emperor Kōkaku (adoptive father)

Kuniie, Prince Fushimi (伏見宮邦家親王, Fushimi-no-miya Kuniie-shinnō; 24 October 1802 – 5 August 1872) was Japanese royalty. He was the 20th/23rd prince head of the House of Fushimi and the eldest son of Prince Fushimi Sadayuki (1776–1841) and his concubine Seiko, (Note: While Fushimi Sadayuki's consort was Ichijo Teruko (1795–1828, daughter of Ichijō Teruyoshi), it's known that Seiko was an adopted daughter of Niwata Shigeyoshi.) which made him the 11th cousin of Emperor Sakuramachi. Despite being merely a distant cousin to the emperors, he was adopted by Emperor Kōkaku as a son in 1817, which made him a full shinnō just like an emperor's natural-born son.

Prince Kuniie became head of the Fushimi-no-miya after the death of his father in 1841. But soon, in 1842, his eldest (natural) son, Zaihan (later Prince Yamashina Akira) ran away with his aunt Princess Takako, while Zaihan was a monk in Kajū-ji. Because of this scandal, the prince soon had to abdicate in favor of the elder son of his wife, Prince Sadanori, who was the sixth out of 17 sons of his father. Prince Kuniie took the name Zengaku (禪樂) as a monk afterwards. In 1864, Kuniie succeeded as Prince Fushimi-no-miya again. After Emperor Meiji moved the capital of Japan to Tokyo, Prince Kuniie left Kyoto and moved to Tokyo with his family in 1872. He abdicated again to his second son (or 14th), Prince Sadanaru, lived in seclusion, and died the same year.

He was the father of 17 princes and 14 princesses (9 of which were born before his marriage to Karatsukasa Hiroko in 1836), including Prince Kuni Asahiko, Prince Yamashina Akira, Prince Higashifushimi Yorihito, Prince Kitashirakawa Yoshihisa, Prince Fushimi Sadanaru, Prince Kan'in Kotohito, the grandfather of Japan's first post-World War II Prime Minister Prince Naruhiko Higashikuni, the great-grandfather of Empress Kōjun, and the great-great grandfather of Emperor Akihito. He was the common ancestor of the Ōke.

== Marriage and Children ==
On January 9, 1836, Prince Kuniie married Takatsukasa Hiroko (1814–1892), daughter of Takatsukasa Masahiro (also, a second cousin of Emperor Ninkō paternally) and had 7 children. Beside his consort, the prince had nine concubines with whom he fathered 24 children.

Consort and issue(s):

- Consort (Hi): Takatsukasa Hiroko (鷹司景子, 15 January 1814– 28 September 1892), daughter of Takatsukasa Masahiro (鷹司 政煕)
  - Sixth Son: Prince Fushimi Sadanori (伏見宮貞教親王, 26 October 1836 – 16 December 1862)
  - Fifth Daughter: Princess Fumiko (碌子女王), (1839 – 1853)
  - Seventh Son: Prince Kiku (喜久宮, 1842 – 1851)
  - Eighth Daughter: Princess Noriko (則子女王), (16 May 1850 – 14 November 1874), wife of Marquis Tokugawa Mochitsugu (徳川 茂承)
  - Ninth Daughter: Princess Kayo (嘉世宮, 1852 – 1853)
  - Eleventh Daughter: Princess Toshi (利宮, 1856 – 1858)
  - Fourteenth son: Prince Fushimi Sadanaru (伏見宮貞愛親王, 9 June 1858 – 4 February 1923)
- Lady-in-waiting (Nyōbō): Fujiki Hisako (藤木寿子)
  - First Son: Prince Yamashina Akira (山階宮晃親王, 22 October 1816 – 17 February 1898)
- Lady-in-waiting (Nyōbō): Ueno Juno (上野寿野)
  - Second Son: Prince Shōgoin Yoshikoto (聖護院宮嘉言親王, 28 February 1821 – 26 September 1868)
  - Third Son: Prince Manshuin Jonin (曼殊院宮譲仁親王, 1824 – 1842)
  - First Daughter: Princess Hisako (恒子女王, 26 February 1826 – 1916)
- Lady-in-waiting (Nyōbō): Torikoji Nobuko (鳥居小路信子)
  - Fourth Son: Prince Kuni Asahiko (久邇宮朝彦親王, 27 February 1824 – 25 October 1891)
- Lady-in-waiting (Nyōbō): Nakamura Soma (中村杣)
  - Second Daughter: Princess Yoriko (順子女王, 1827 – 1908), Wife of the former Minister of the Left Ichijō Tadaka (一条忠香)
  - Third Daughter: Koga Sei'en (久我誓円, 1828 – 1910) – became an adopted daughter of Koga Michiaki (1780-1855) in 1875
- Lady-in-waiting (Nyōbō): Furuyama Chie (古山千恵)
  - Fourth Daughter: Princess Tomoko (和子女王, 19 January 1830 – 4 June 1884), Wife of Otani Mitsukatsu (大谷光勝)
- Lady-in-waiting (Nyōbō): Kazuo Kondō (近藤加寿尾)
  - Fifth Son: Stillborn (1832 – 1832)
- Lady-in-waiting (Nyōbō): Horiuchi Nobuko (堀内信子)
  - Sixth Daughter: Stillborn (1840 – 1840)
  - Eighth Son: Prince Komatsu Akihito (小松宮彰仁親王, 11 February 1846 – 18 February 1903)
  - Ninth Son: Prince Kitashirakawa Yoshihisa (北白川宮能久親王, 1 April 1847 – 5 November 1895)
  - Tenth Son: Prince Aki (誠宮, 1848 – 1853)
  - Eleventh Son: Prince Naru (愛宮, 1849 – 1851)
  - Twelfth Son: Prince Kachō Hirotsune (華頂宮博経親王, 19 April 1851 – 24 May 1876)
- Lady-in-waiting (Nyōbō): Simuko Kimura (木村世牟子)
  - Seventh Daughter: Princess Bunshū (文秀女王, 29 January 1844 – 15 February 1926) – became a buddhist nun at Enshō-ji
- Lady-in-waiting (Nyōbō): Itami Yoshiko (伊丹吉子)
  - Tenth Daughter: Murakumo Nichi'ei (村雲日栄, 3 April 1855 – 1920) – became a Buddhist nun
  - Thirteenth Son: Prince Kitashirakawa Satonari (北白川宮智成親王 Kitashirakawa-no-miya Satonari shinnō), (22 July 1856 – 10 February 1872)
  - Twelfth Daughter: Princess Takako (貴子女王, 4 January 1858 – 1919), Wife of Count Matsudaira Tadataka
  - Thirteenth Daughter: Stillborn (1859 – 1859)
  - Fourteenth Daughter: Princess Tame (多明宮, 1860 –1864)
  - Fifteenth Son: Count Kiyosu Ienori (清棲家教伯爵, 19 June 1862 – 13 July 1923)
  - Sixteenth Son: Prince Kan'in Kotohito (閑院宮載仁親王, 10 November 1865 – 21 May 1945)
  - Seventeenth Son: Prince Higashifushimi Yorihito (東伏見宮依仁親王, 19 September 1867 – 27 June 1922)
  - Fifteenth Daughter: Princess Machi (萬千宮, 1869 –1872)

Among 12 surviving sons of Prince Kuniie, 2 of them succeeded Fushimi-no-miya, other 9 were granted with Shinnōke and the other one became a count.
