= Monzeki =

Japanese Buddhist priests of aristocratic or imperial lineage

Monzeki (門跡) were Japanese Buddhist priests of aristocratic or Imperial lineage. The term was also applied to the temples in which they lived.

An example of a monzeki temple is Daikaku-ji in Kyoto.
