= Fushimi-no-miya =

One of the four Japanese imperial branches

Fushimi-no-miya 伏見宮
- Branch of the Imperial Family of Japan (shinnōke)
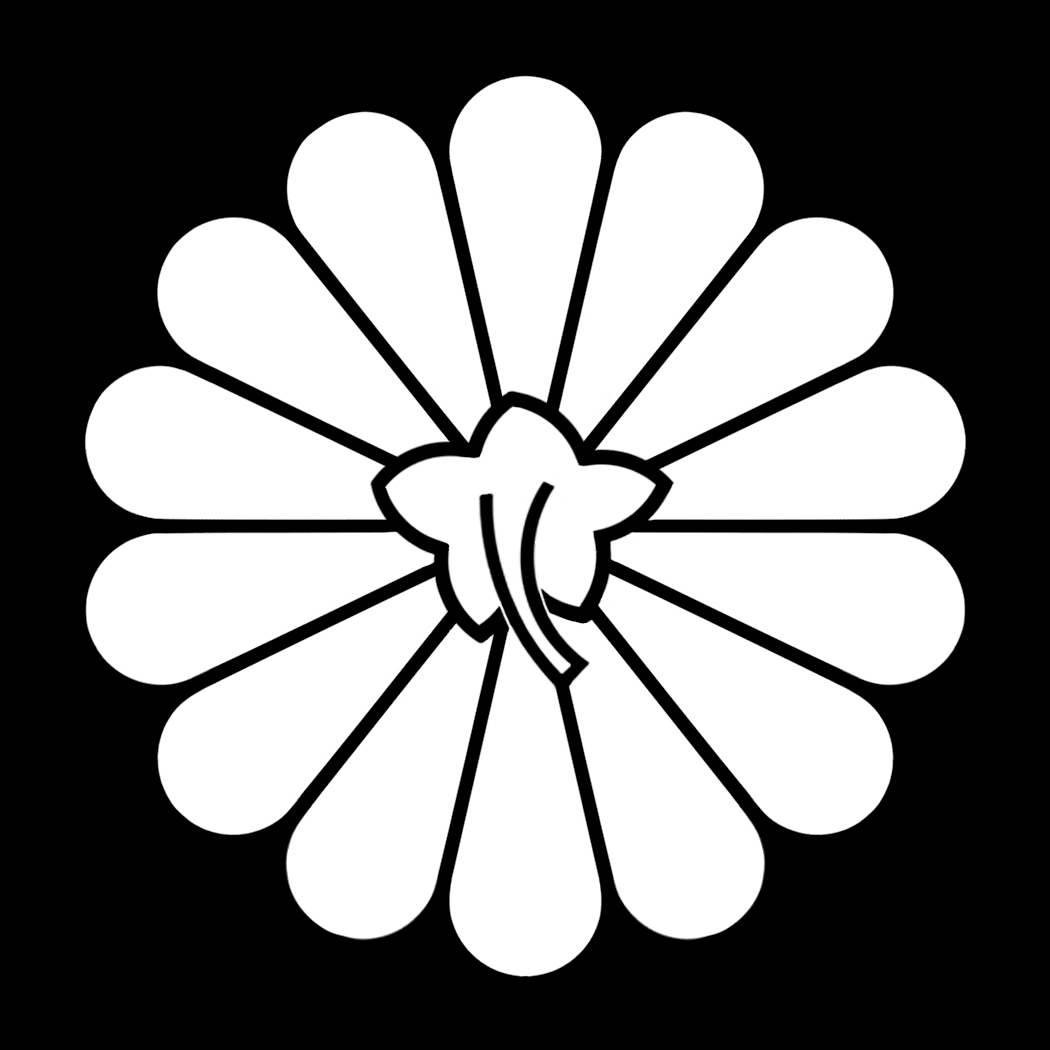
- Mon of Kan'in-no-miya
- Parent family: Imperial Family of Japan
- Origin: Kyoto
- Founded: 1409
- Founder: Imperial Prince Yoshihito (Nouthern Court Emperor Sukō's first son)
- Current head: Hiroaki Fushimi
- Connected families: Arisugawa-no-miya; Kan'in-no-miya; Takatsukasa noble family
- Deposition: 1947
- Cadet branches: Nashimoto-no-miya; Yamashina-no-miya; Kuni-no-miya; Kachō-no-miya; Komatsu-no-miya; Kitashirakawa-no-miya; Higashifushimi-no-miya; Kiyosu comital family (non-imperial branch); Kachō marquisal family (non-imperial branch); Fushimi comital family (non-imperial branch)

The Fushimi-no-miya (伏見宮) is the oldest of the four shinnōke, branches of the Imperial Family of Japan which were eligible to succeed to the Chrysanthemum Throne in the order of succession.

The Fushimi-no-miya was founded by Prince Yoshihito, the son of the Northern Court Emperor Sukō. As the house was founded by a Northern Pretender, the first three princes are sometimes not recognized as legitimate Fushimi princes.

All of the much later ōke were branches off the Fushimi-no-miya house, all but one of them being created by sons of Fushimi-no-miya Kuniye.

Unless stated otherwise, each prince is the son of his predecessor.

| | Name | Born | Succeeded | Resigned | Died | Notes |
|---|---|---|---|---|---|---|
| 1 | Yoshihito (栄仁) | 1351 | 1409 | . | 1416 | Son of Emperor Sukō |
| 2 | Haruhito (治仁) | 1370 | 1416 | . | 1417 | |
| 3 | Sadafusa (貞成) | 1372 | 1425 | 1447 | 1456 | son of Yoshihito; father of Emperor Go-Hanazono and the most recent common ancestor in the paternal line of the current Imperial family and its former collateral branches |
| 4 | Sadatsune (貞常) | 1426 | 1456 | . | 1474 | brother of Emperor Go-Hanazono |
| 5 | Kunitaka (邦高) | 1456 | 1474 | 1516 | 1532 | |
| 6 | Sadaatsu (貞敦) | 1488 | 1504 | 1545 | 1572 | |
| 7 | Kunisuke (邦輔) | 1513 | 1531 | . | 1563 | |
| 8 | Sadayasu (貞康) | 1547 | 1563 | . | 1568 | |
| 9 | Kuninobu (邦房) | 1566 | 1575 | . | 1622 | son of Kunisuke (#7) |
| 10 | Sadakiyo (貞清) | 1596 | 1605 | . | 1654 | |
| 11 | Kuninari (邦尚) | 1615 | 1626 | . | 1654 | |
| 12 | Kunimichi (邦道) | 1641 | 1649 | . | 1654 | son of Sadakiyo (#10) |
| 13 | Sadayuki (貞致) | 1632 | 1660 | . | 1694 | son of Sadakiyo (#10) |
| 14 | Kuninaga (邦永) | 1676 | 1695 | . | 1726 | |
| 15 | Sadatake (貞建) | 1701 | 1715 | . | 1754 | |
| 16 | Kunitada (邦忠) | 1732 | 1743 | 1754 | 1759 | |
| 17 | Sadamochi (貞行) | 1760 | 1763 | . | 1772 | son of Emperor Momozono |
| 18 | Kuniyori (邦頼) | 1733 | 1774 | . | 1802 | son of Sadatake (#15) |
| 19 | Sadayoshi (貞敬) | 1776 | 1797 | . | 1841 | |
| 20/23 | Kuniie (邦家) | 1802 | 1817 | . | 1872 | See ōke |
| 21 | Sadanori (貞教) | 1836 | 1848 | . | 1862 | |
| 22/24 | Sadanaru (貞愛) | 1858 | 1862 | . | 1923 | son of Kuniie (#20) |
| 25 | Hiroyasu (博恭) | 1875 | 1923 | . | 1946 | |
| 26 | Hiroaki (博明) | 1932 | 1946 | 1947 | . | Current head; grandson of Hiroyasu |

The sesshu shinnōke and ōke households, along with the kazoku (Japanese peerage), were reduced to commoner status during the American occupation of Japan, in 1947.

== Family tree ==
This is a family tree of the Fushimi-no-miya of those eligible to succeed to the throne and their ancestors, excluding those who are extinct or demoted to commoners (renounced their imperial status). Numbers provided are given assuming that the Oke are restored.

Female Male

Okihito; 1334–1398 Sukō; 1348–1351
Yoshihito shinnō 1351–1416
Sadafusa shinnō 1372–1456
Fushimi; Sadatsune; 1426–1474 | Hikohito; 1419–1471 Go-Hanazono; 1428–1464^{(102)}
Fushimi; Kunitaka; 1456–1532 | Fusahito; 1442–1500 Go-Tsuchimikado; 1464–1500^{(103)}
Fushimi; Sadaatsu; 1488–1572 | Katsuhito; 1464–1526 Go-Kashiwabara; 1500–1526^{(104)}
Fushimi; Kunisuke; 1513–1563 | Tomohito; 1497–1557 Go-Nara; 1526–1557^{(105)}
Michihito; 1517–1593 Ōgimachi; 1557–1586^{(106)}
Prince Masahito; 1552–1586
Fushimi; Kuninobu; 1566–1622
Kazuhito; 1572–1617 Go-Yōzei; 1586–1611^{(107)}
Kokohito; 1596–1680 Go-Mizunoo; 1611–1629^{(108)}
Satohito; 1654–1732 Reigen; 1663–1687^{(112)}
Asahito; 1675–1710 Higashiyama; 1687–1709^{(113)}
Fushimi; Sadakiyo; 1596–1654
Fushimi; Sadayuki; 1632–1694 | Naohito shinnō 1704–1753
Fushimi; Kuninaga; 1676–1726 | Yoshiko; 1676–1707 | Sukehito shinnō 1733–1794
Fushimi; Sadatake; 1701–1754
Morohito; 1771–1840 Kōkaku; 1780–1817^{(119)}
Fushimi; Kuniyori; 1733–1802
Ayahito; 1800–1846 Ninkō; 1817–1846^{(120)}
Fushimi; Sadayuki; 1776–1841
Osahito; 1831–1867 Kōmei; 1846–1867^{(121)}
Fushimi; Kuniie; 1802–1872 | Kitashirakawa Yoshihisa (1847–1895) | Mutsuhito; 1852–1912 Meiji; 1867–1912^{(122)}
Prince Fushimi Sadanaru; 1858-1923 | Kuni Asahiko; 1824–1891 | Kuni; Kuniyoshi; 1873–1929 | Prince Asaka Yasuhiko | Prince Higashikuni Naruhiko | Prince Tsunehisa Takeda; 1882-1919 | Princess Masako Takeda (1888–1940)
Prince Fushimi Hiroyasu | Prince Kaya Kuninori; 1867-1909 | Prince Asaka Takehiko | Higashikuni Morihiro | Prince Tsuneyoshi Takeda (1909–1992)
Prince Fushimi Hiroyoshi; 1897-1938 | Kaya Tsunenori | Prince Kuni Asaakira | Prince Asaka Tomohiko (b. 1943); 15 | Nobuhiko Higashikuni | Prince Takeda Tsunetada (b. 1940); 26 | Prince Takeda Tsuneharu (b. 1944); 28 | Tsunekazu Takeda (1947-present); 31
Fushimi Hiroaki; 1932-present 4th in line | Prince Kaya Akinori (1929-1994) | Prince Kuni Kuniaki (b. 1929); 8 | Prince Kuni Asatake (b. 1940); 11 | Prince Kuni Asahiro (b. 1944); 14 | Asaka Akihiko (b. 1972); 16 | Higashikuni Masahiko (b. 1974); 17 | Higashikuni Naohiko (b. 1953); 20 | Takeda Tsunetaka (born 1974); 27 | Takeda Tsuneaki (b. 1979); 29 | Takeda Tsunetomo (b.1980); 30 | Takeda Tsuneyasu (1975-present); 32nd in line | Takeda Tsuneyoshi (b. 1978); 33rd in line
Kaya Masanori (b. 1959); 5th in line | Kuni Asataka (b. 1959); 9 | Kuni Kuniharu (b. 1961); 10 | Kuni Asatoshi (b. 1971); 12 | Unknown first son of Higashikuni Masahiko (b. 2010); 18 | Unknown second son of Higashikuni Masahiko (b. 2014); 19 | Higashikuni Teruhiko (b. 1979); 21 | Higashikuni Mutsuhiko (b. 1980); 23 | Higashikuni Morihiko (b. 1967); 25
Kaya Hidenori (b. 1996); 6 | Unknown second son of Kaya Masanori (b. 1998); 7 | Unknown son of Kuni Asatoshi; 13 | Unknown son of Higashikuni Teruhiko (b. 2004); 22 | Unknown son of Higashikuni Mutsuhiko (b. 2012); 24

== See also ==
- Succession to the Japanese throne
- Family Tree of Japanese deities
