= Thirteen Buddhist Sites of Kyoto =

Buddhist sacred sites in Kyoto, Japan

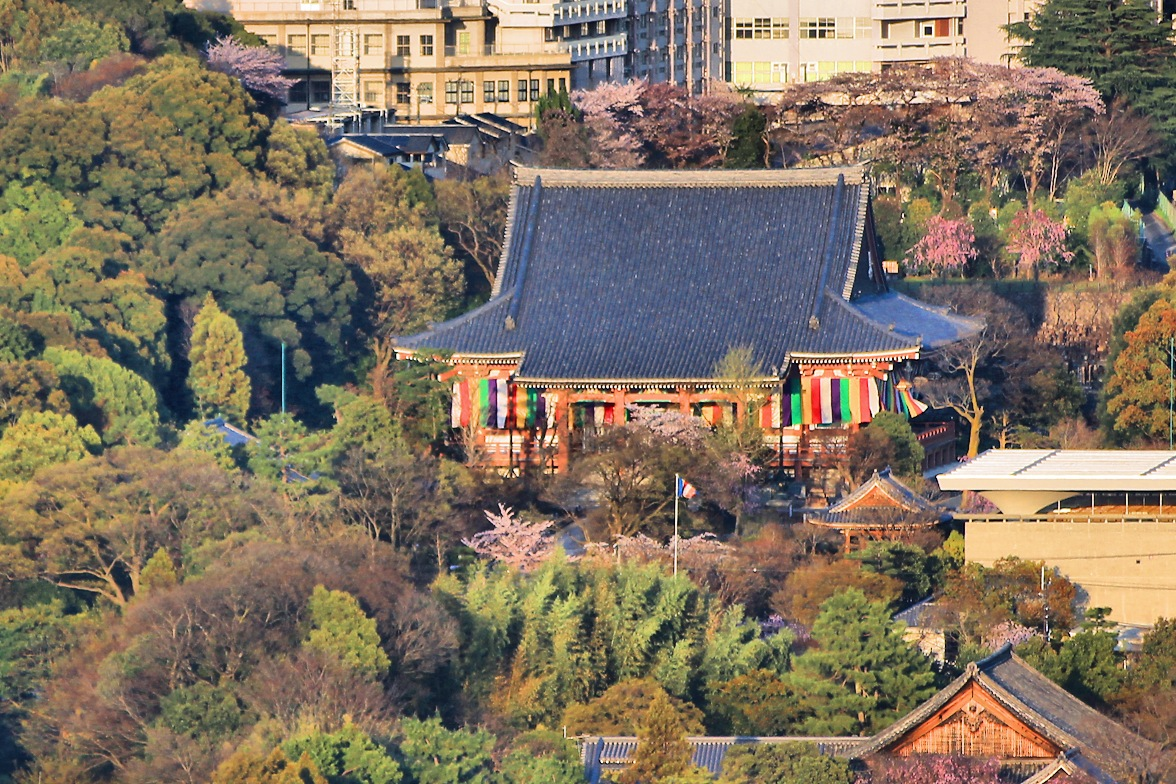
Chishaku-in temple

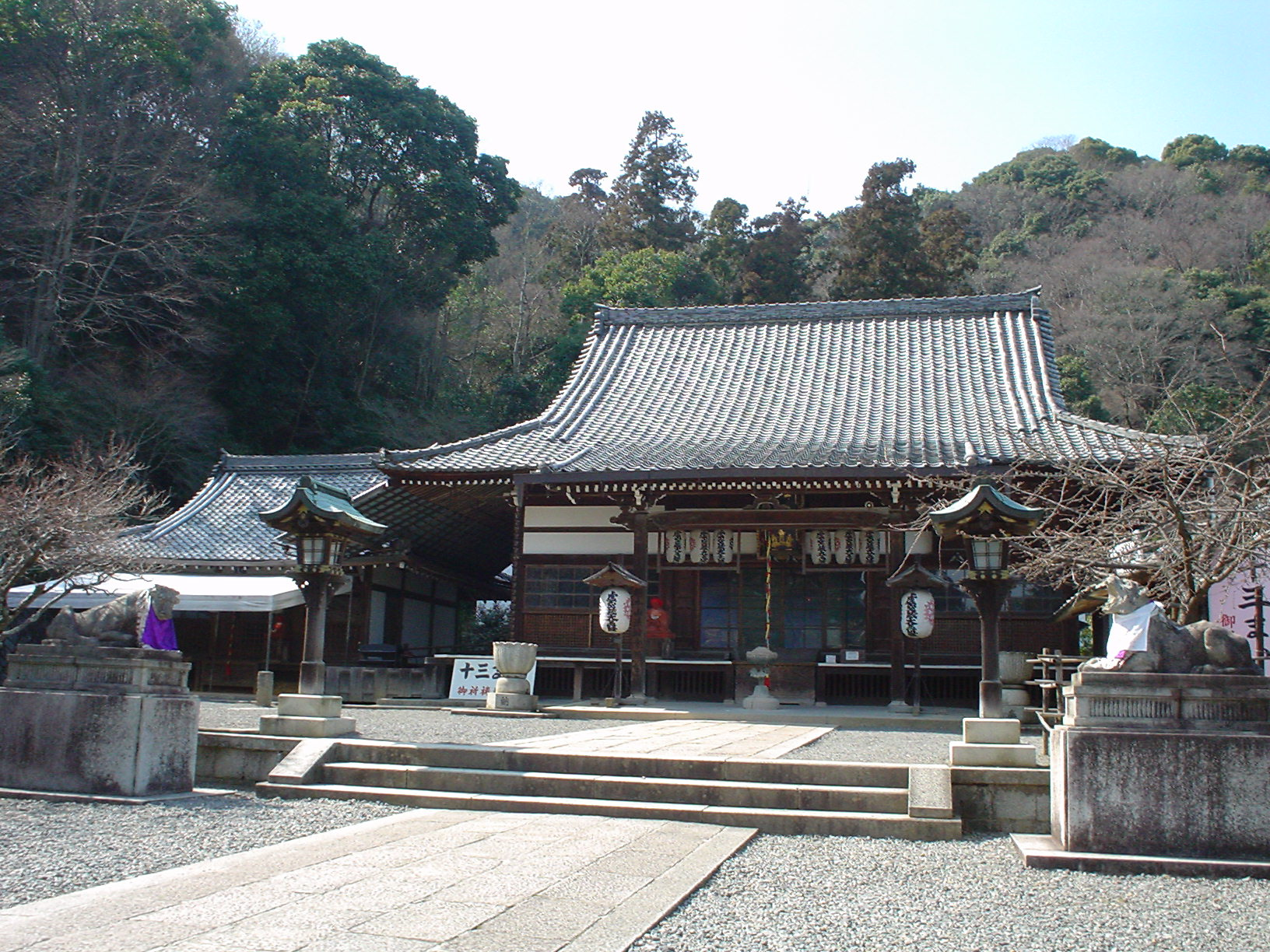
Hōrin-ji

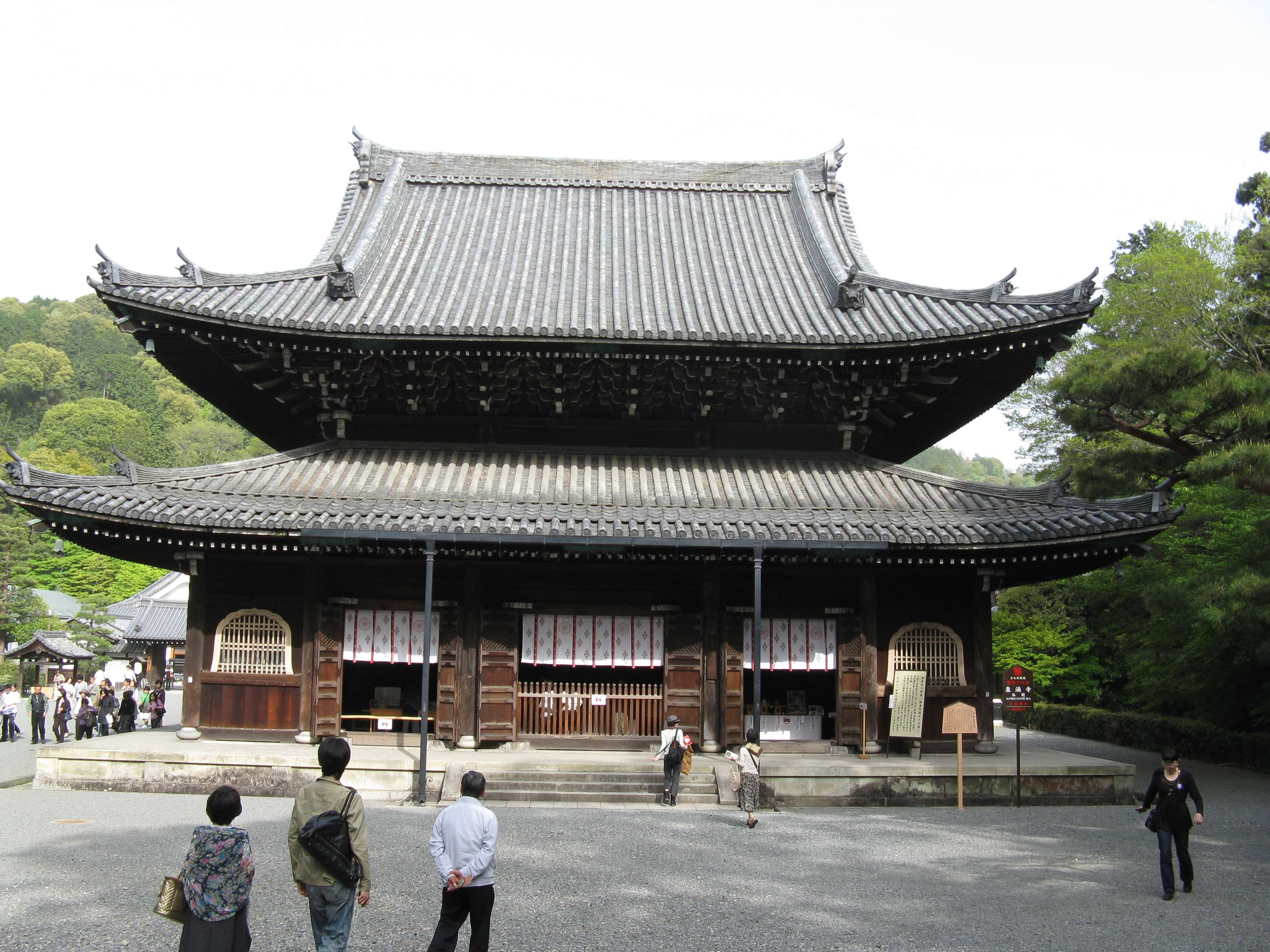
Sennyuji butsuden

The Thirteen Buddhist Sites of Kyoto (京都十三仏霊場, Kyōto jūsan butsu reijō) are a group of 13 Buddhist sacred sites in Kyoto, Kyoto Prefecture. The majority of the temples in this grouping are part of Japanese esoteric Shingon Buddhism and the Rinzai school.

== Directory ==
Number	Temple	Principal image	Sect	Location
1.	Chishaku-in	Fudō-myōō	Shingon-shū Chizan-ha	Kyoto, Higashiyama-ku
2.	Seiryō-ji	Shaka Nyorai	Jōdo-shū	Kyoto, Ukyō-ku, Sagashakadofujinokicho
3.	Reiun'in	Monju Bosatsu	Tōfuku-ji Rinzai	Kyoto, Higashiyama-ku Honmachi
4.	Daikōmyō-ji	Fugen Bosatsu	Shōkoku-ji Rinzai	Kyoto, Kamigyō-ku, Kamitachiuricho
5.	Daizen-ji	Jizō Bosatsu	Jōdo-shū	Kyoto, Fushimi-ku, Momoyama Nishimachi
6.	Sennyū-ji	Miroku Bosatsu	Sennyū-ji Shingon	Kyoto, Higashiyama-ku, Sennyuji Yamanouchicho
7.	Byōdō-ji	Yakushi Nyorai	Shingon-shū Chizan-ha	Kyoto, Shimogyō-ku, Torimaru Matsubarahigashi
8.	Daihōon-ji	Kannon Bosatsu	Shingon-shū Chizan-ha	Kyoto, Kamigyō-ku, Gotsujidori
9.	Ninna-ji	Seishi Bosatsu	Omuro Shingon	Kyoto, Ukyō-ku, Omuroouchi
10.	Hōkongō-in	Amida Nyorai	Tōshōdai-ji Risshū	Kyoto, Ukyō-ku, Hanazonooginocho
11.	Hōkan-ji	Ashuku Nyorai	Ninna-ji Rinzai	Kyoto, Higashiyama-ku, Yasaka Kamimachi
12.	Tō-ji	Dainichi Nyorai	Tō-ji Shingon	Kyoto, Minami-ku, Kujōchō
13.	Hōrin-ji	Kokūzō Bosatsu	Hōrai-ji Shingon	Kyoto, Nishikyō-ku, Arashiyama Kokuzoyamacho

== See also ==
- Thirteen Buddhas
