= Prince Fushimi Yoshihito =

Japanese prince (1351–1416)

Prince Fushimi Yoshihito 伏見宮栄仁親王

Prince Fushimi
- Reign: 1409 – 1416
- Predecessor: Title created
- Successor: Prince Fushimi Haruhitō

Head of Fushimi-no-miya
- Reign: 1409 – 1416
- Born: 1352
- Died: 9 December 1416 (age 65)
- Spouse: Sanjō Haruko
- Issue: Prince Fushimi Haruhitō; Prince Fushimi Sadafusa among others
- House: The Imperial House
- Father: Emperor Sukō
- Mother: Niwata Motoko

Prince Fushimi Yoshihito (伏見宮栄仁親王, Fushimi-no-miya Yoshihito shinnō) (1351 – 9 December 1416) was a member of the Japanese imperial family during the Northern and Southern Courts period. He was the eldest son of Emperor Sukō and the founder of the Fushimi-no-miya branch of the imperial family.

== Biography ==
Fushimi was born to Emperor Sukō and a lady-in-waiting in 1352, the first year of the emperor's reign. In 1368, the 23rd year of the Shōhei era, he was named Imperial Prince Yoshihitō (仁親王). Fushimi underwent a coming-of-age ceremony in November 1375 and received the title of Nihon, the second-highest rank for a prince.

Sukō hoped that Yoshihito, the first prince of the Jimyoin imperial line, would succeed him as emperor. However, at the time, the Japanese imperial house was separated into several branches, including Sukō's Northern Court line and another line led by his younger brother Emperor Go-Kōgon. It was thus difficult for Yoshihito to become the undisputed emperor of Japan.

After the abdicated Sukō died in 1398, Imperial Prince Yoshihito lost his most powerful political supporter and joined the priesthood in May 1398.

In 1416, Prince Yoshihito began to suffer from illness. His fellow priests attempted to cure him with several Buddhist rituals, none of which were successful. Buddhists were brought in to deliver an unsuccessful healing incantation as well. Yoshihito died on 9 December 1416. The senior monks at Daikōmyōji made incense offerings on his behalf. The prince's body was cremated four days later.

Yoshihito's posthumous Buddhist name was Daitsuin (は大通院).

== Genealogy ==
Parents

- Father: Emperor Sukō (崇光天皇, May 25, 1334 – January 31, 1398)
- Mother: Niwata Motoko (庭田資子; d.1394), Niwata Shigemoto's daughter

Consort and issue(s):

- Consort (Hi): Sanjō Haruko (三条治子, d. 17 January 1399), later known as Nishi-no-Kata (西御方), daughter of Sanjō Mitsuji (三条実治)
  - Son: Prince Fushimi Haruhitō (伏見宮治仁王, 1370 – 28 February 1417)
  - Son: Prince Fushimi Sadafusa (伏見宮 貞成親王, 9 April 1372 – 28 September 1456), father of Emperor Go-Hanazono
- Wife (Nyōbō): Lady Hojūan (宝珠庵), daughter of Sanjō Sanane (三条実音)
  - Son: Prince Nōkin (周乾王)
  - Daughter: Unnamed Princess
- Wife (Nyōbō): Okata no Azuma (東御方), daughter of Sanjō Sanetsugu (三条実継)
  - Son: Prince Megumi (恵舜王)
  - Son: Unnamed Prince
  - Son: Unnamed Prince
- Wife (Nyōbō): Rō-no-Kata (廊御方), daughter of Hinonishi Sukekuni (日野西資国)
  - Son: Lord Shiinōji (椎野寺主)
- Wife (Nyōbō): Unknown
  - Son: Prince Hongin (洪蔭王)

Regnal titles
Preceded by Title created	Prince Fushimi; 1409 – 1416	Succeeded by Prince Fushimi Hidehitō
