= Hōkongō-in =

Buddhist temple in Kyoto Prefecture

Coordinates: 35°01′09″N 135°42′57″E

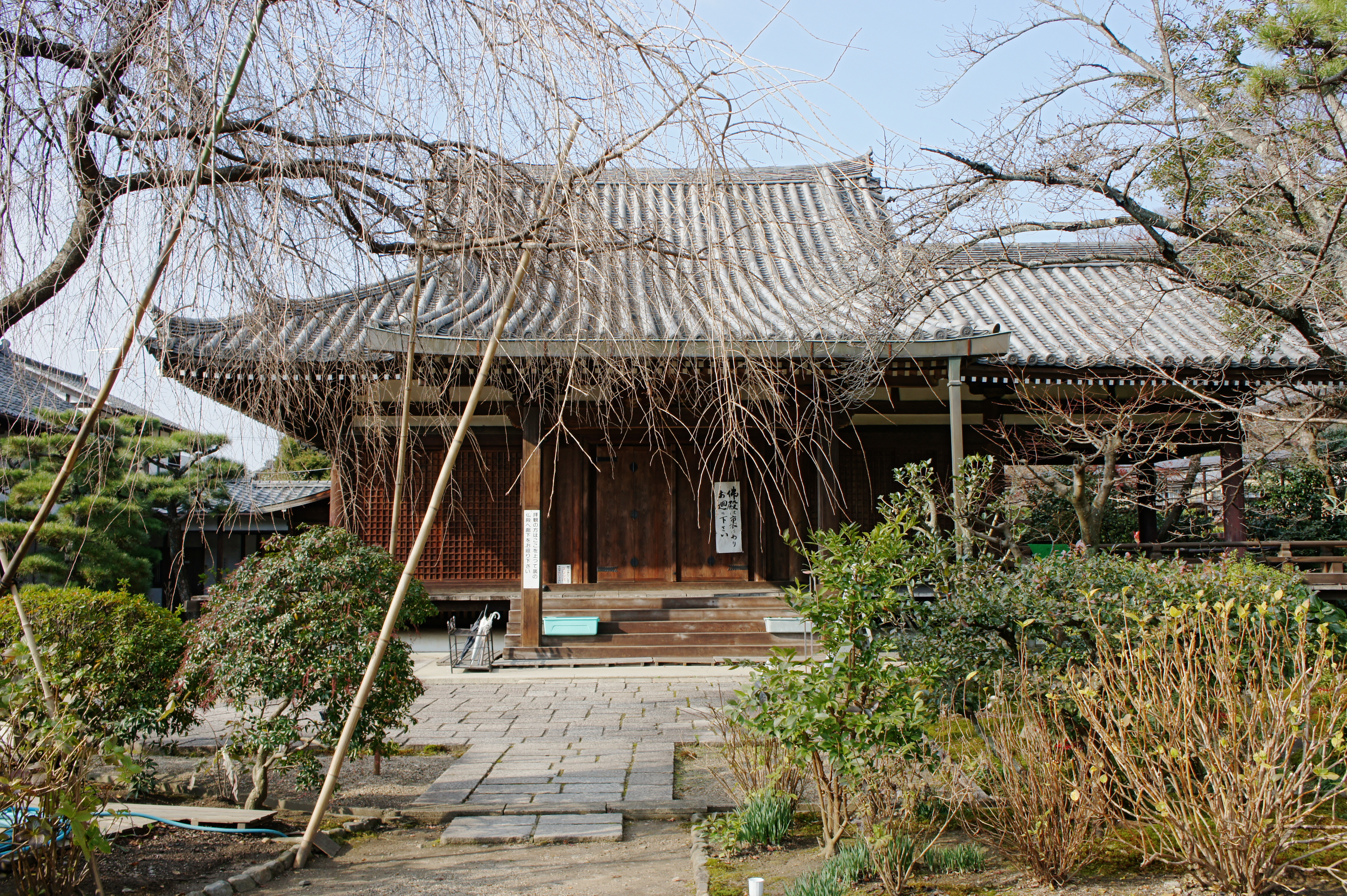
Worship hall

Hōkongō-in (法金剛院) is a Buddhist temple in Ukyō-ku, Kyoto, Japan. It is affiliated with the Risshū school of Buddhism. It was founded in 1130 in the Ninna-ji monastic complex by Fujiwara no Tamako, who had taken Buddhist vows and become a nun under the name Taikenmon-in.

== See also ==
- Thirteen Buddhist Sites of Kyoto
- List of National Treasures of Japan (sculptures)
