= Daihōon-ji =

Buddhist temple in Kyoto, Japan

Coordinates: 35.0319°N 135.7399°E

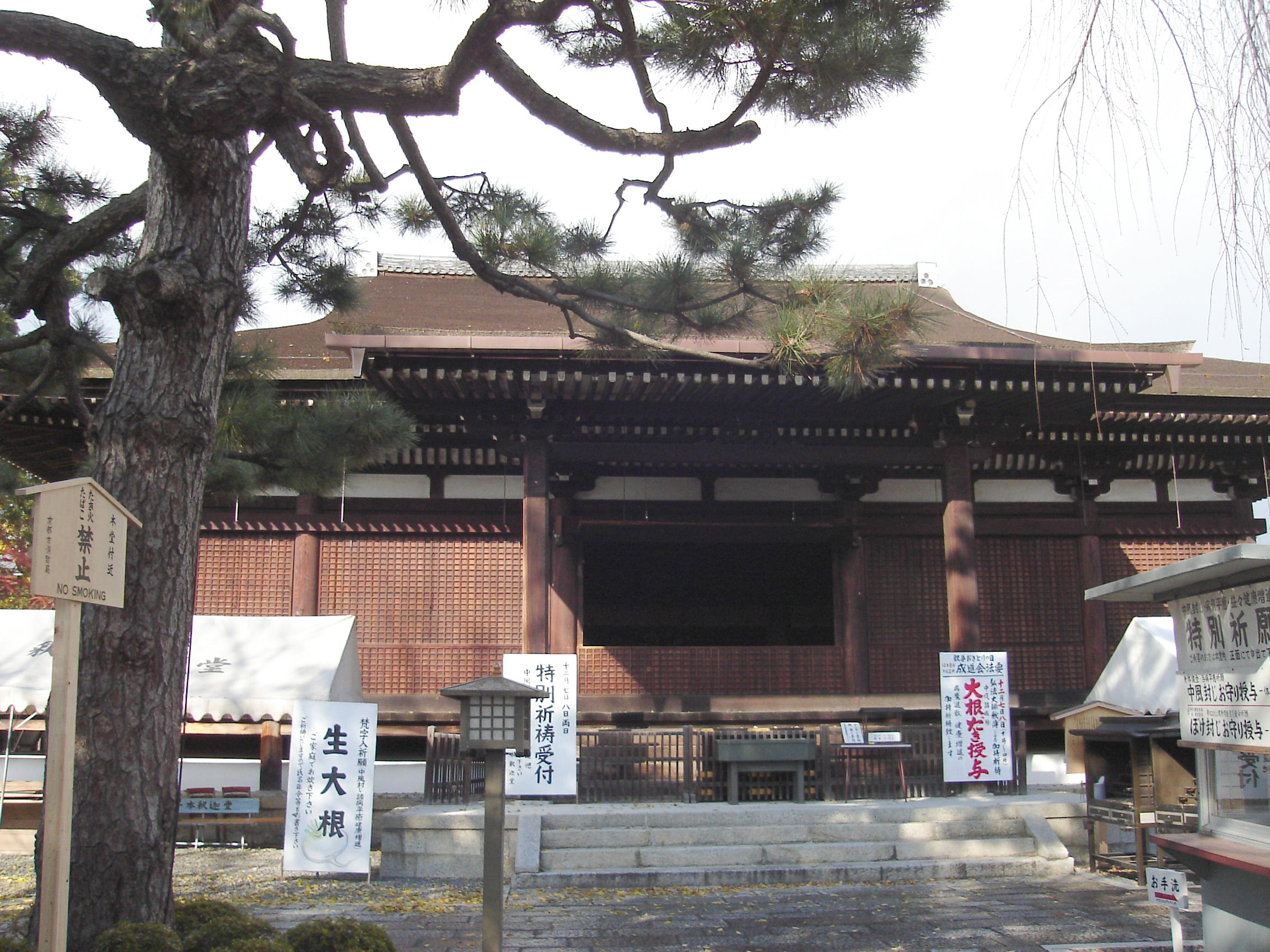
Main hall

Daihōon-ji (大報恩寺) is a Buddhist temple in Kamigyō-ku, Kyoto, Japan. It is affiliated with Shingon-shū Chizan-ha Buddhism. Its main hall (本堂, hondō) or Senbon Shakadō (千本釈迦堂) is a National Treasure of Japan.

== History ==
Daihōon-ji was founded by Guhou Shōnin (求法上人), also known as Gikū (義空), in 1221, the early Kamakura period. The main hall was constructed around 1227 and escaped the destruction in the Ōnin War. The hondō is the oldest wooden building in existence in Kyoto city.

== See also ==
- Thirteen Buddhist Sites of Kyoto
- List of National Treasures of Japan (temples)
- List of National Treasures of Japan (sculptures)
