= Byōdō-ji =

Buddhist temple in Kyoto Prefecture, Japan

Coordinates: 34.9995°N 135.7603°E

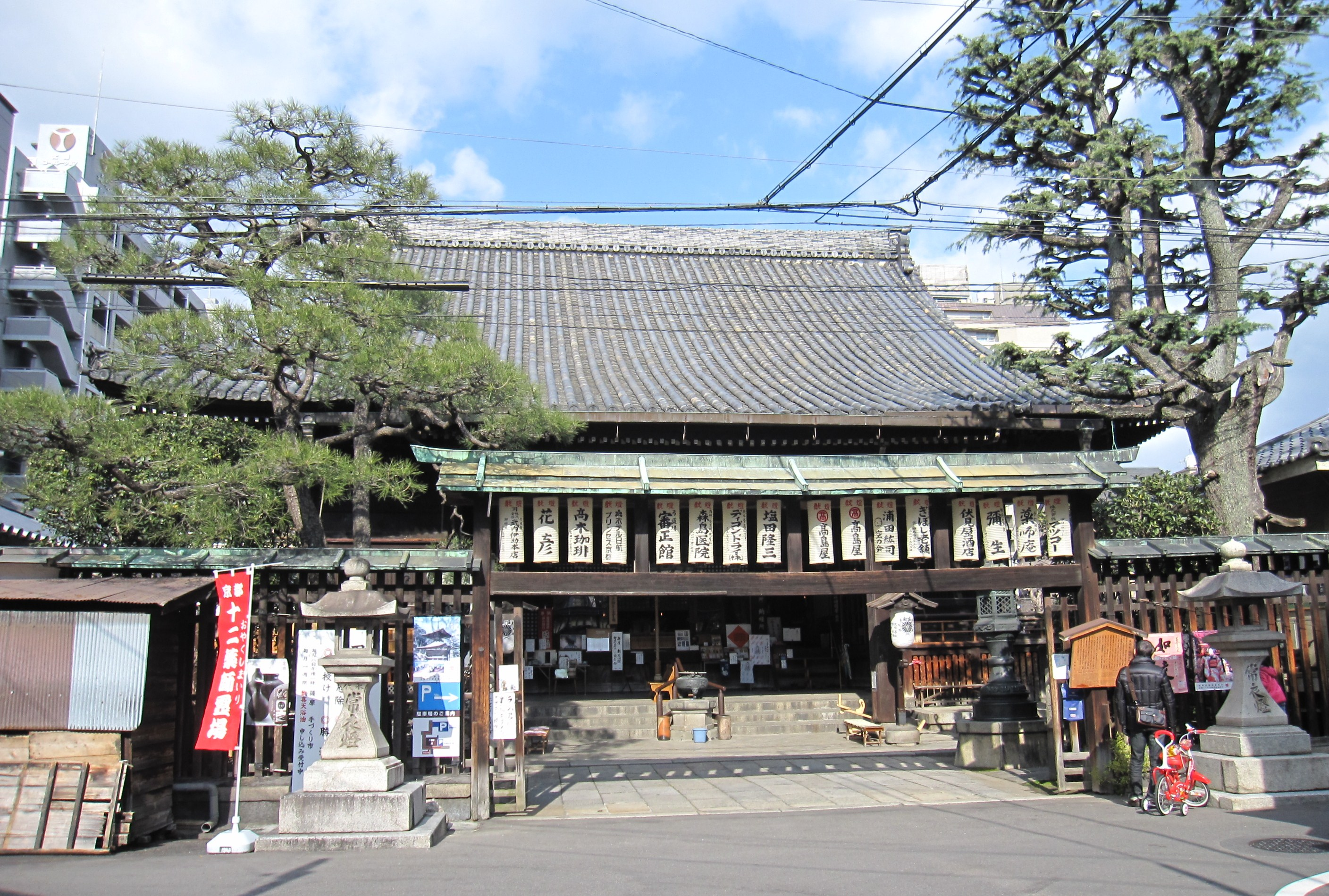

Byōdō-ji (平等寺) is a Buddhist temple in Shimogyō-ku, Kyoto Prefecture, Japan. It was founded in 1003, and it is dedicated to Yakushi Nyorai. The temple is affiliated with the Shingon-shū Chizan-ha. It is also known as Inabadō or Inaba Yakushi (因幡堂、因幡薬師).

== See also ==
- Thirteen Buddhist Sites of Kyoto
