= Hōrin-ji (Kyoto) =

Buddhist temple in Kyoto Prefecture, Japan

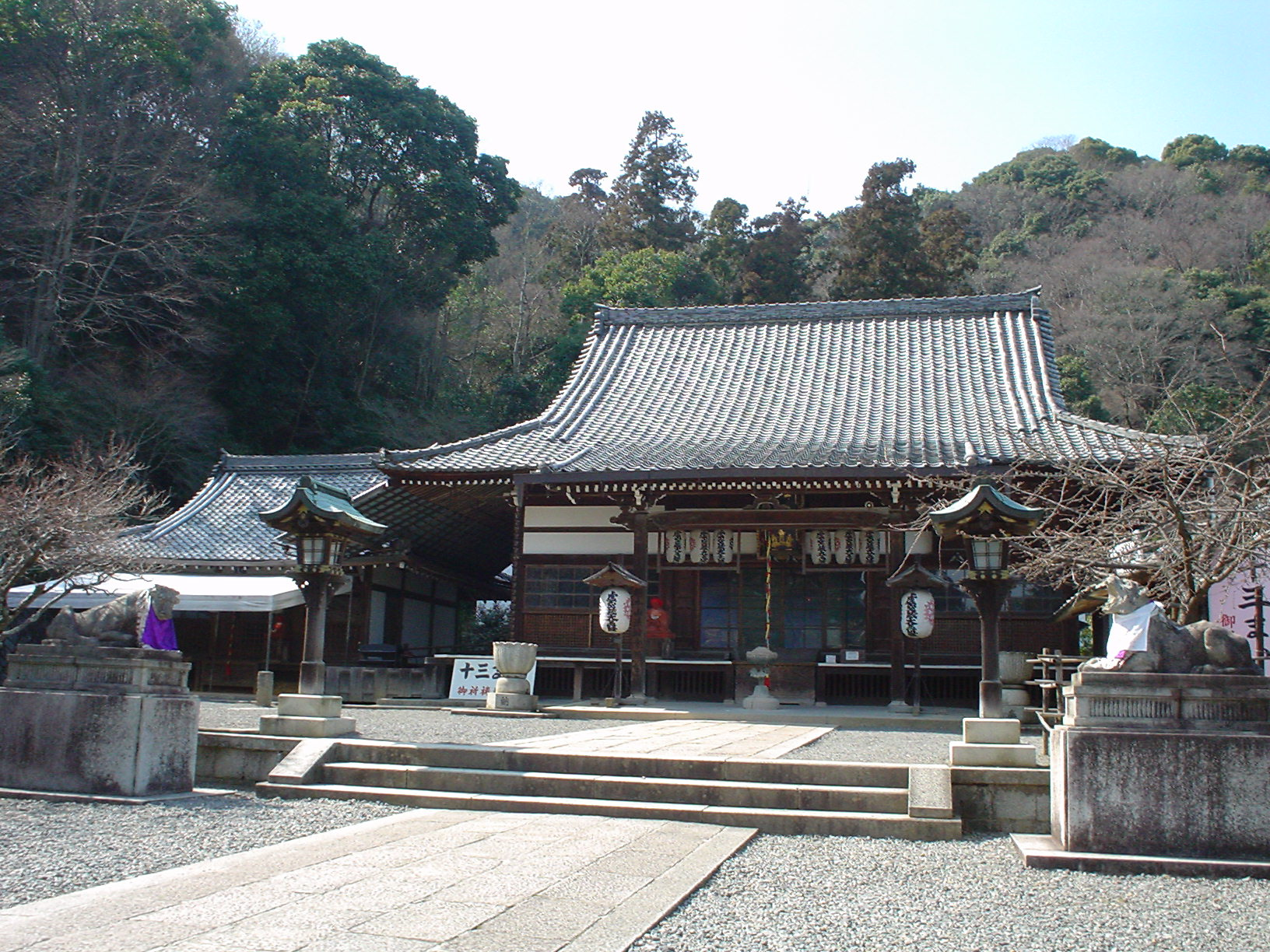
Hōrin-ji

Hōrin-ji (法輪寺; the 'temple of the Dharma Wheel') is a Shingon Buddhist temple in Arashiyama, Kyoto Prefecture, Japan. The honorary sangō prefix is Chifuku-san (智福山). The temple is said to have been constructed by Gyōki in 713 AD, and was originally named Kadonoi-dera (葛井寺). It is dedicated to Ākāśagarbha (Sanskrit: आकाशकर्भ; Japanese: 虚空蔵, Japanese: kokūzō) the bodhisattva (Sanskrit: बोधिसत्त्वः; Japanese: 菩薩) of the boundless space.

It is one of the Thirteen Buddhist Sites of Kyoto.
