= Daizen-ji =

Buddhist temple in Japan

Daizen-ji 大善寺
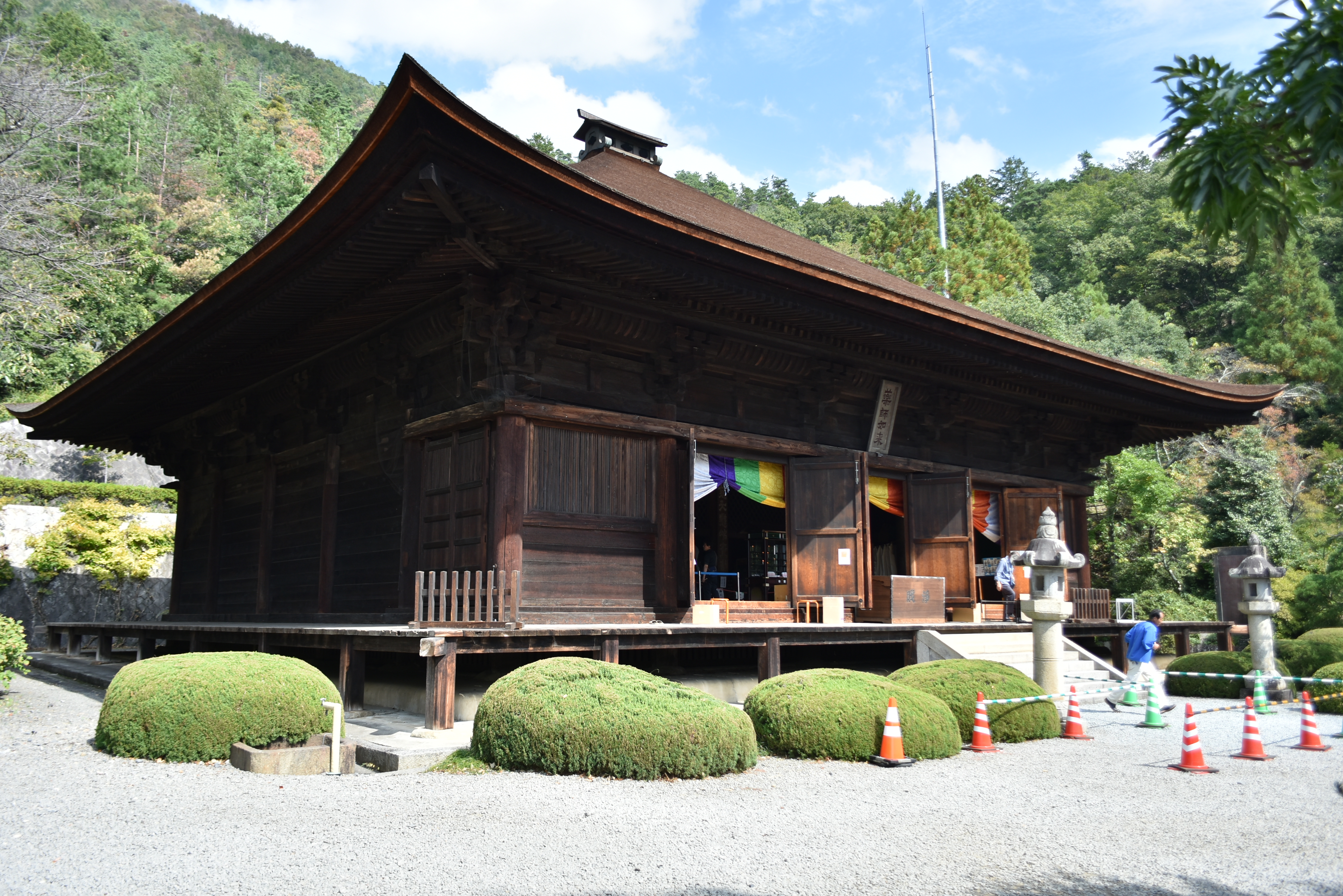
- Daizen-ji Yakushi-do

- Daizen-ji Daizen-ji (Japan)

Religion
- Affiliation: Buddhism
- Deity: Yakushi Nyōrai
- Rite: Shingon-shū Chizan-ha

Location
- Location: 3559 Katsunuma, Katsunuma-cho, Kōshū-shi, Yamanashi-ken
- Country: Japan
- Interactive map of Daizen-ji 大善寺
- Coordinates: 35°39′21.4″N 138°44′35.4″E

Architecture
- Founder: Gyōki
- Completed: c. 718 AD

Website
- katsunuma.ne.jp/~daizenji/

Daizen-ji (大善寺) is a Buddhist temple belonging to the Shingon school of Japanese Buddhism, located in the city of Kōshū, Yamanashi, Japan. Its main image is a hibutsu statue of Yakushi Nyōrai, shown to the public every five years,

== History ==
The temple claims to have been founded in the Nara period by the monk Gyōki; however, the style of the main image is from the early Heian period, and written records only exist to verify the reconstruction of the main hall in 971 AD. The temple was the clan temple of the Saigusa clan, an ancient Gōzoku clan who controlled the eastern Kōfu basin. The temple was patronized by the Takeda clan in the Sengoku period, and in 1582, Takeda Katsuyori, fleeing defeat at the Battle of Tenmokuzan at Shinpu Castle at the hands of the armies of Oda Nobunaga and Tokugawa Ieyasu, spent one night at this temple. The nun Rikei subsequently wrote a history of the downfall of the Takeda clan, the "Rikei-ni no Ki", at this temple.

== Cultural properties ==
=== National treasures ===
==== Daizen-ji Yakushi-dō ====
The main hall at Daizen-ji Yakushi-dō (薬師堂) was built in the Kamakura period by the Shikken Hōjō Sadatoki. It was completed in 1290 and is the oldest building in the prefecture. The building is approximately square in layout, with 18 meter long sides and a simple pyramidal roof. In front are doors in the three middle spaces between the columns, and lattice widows on either side. There is one additional door on each side and in the center of the back of the building. The columns have two-stage wooden capitals to support the roof. The building was extensively repaired in the early Edo period, and was completely taken apart, examined and reassembled in 1954. The building was designated an Important Cultural Property of Japan on August 28, 1907 and the designation was upgraded to that of a National Treasure of Japan on June 22, 1955. The altar within the building dates from 1355 and is also included within the National Treasure designation.

=== National Important Cultural Properties ===
==== Daizen-ji Yakushi Nyōrai ====
The main image of Daizen-ji, this seated image of Yakushi Nyōrai is carved from a single block of cherry wood and is coated with lacquer and gold leaf. From its style, it dates from the early Heian period. The state is 85.5 cm tall. It is flanked by two standing attendants, a Nikkō Bosatsu and a Gakkō Bosatsu, both form the same period and both also carved from single blocks of wood, which the temple inexplicably refers to as Jizō Bosatsu in its home page. The statues were collectively designated as an Important Cultural Property of Japan on April 4, 1905.

==== Daizen-ji Jūni Shinshō ====
The Yakushi Nyōrai of Daizen-ji is flanked by statues of the Twelve Heavenly Generals which date from the Kamakura period. Each statue is from 138 to 145 cm tall, and are attributed to the sculptor Renkei, an artist of the Kei school whose works are found at other temples in Kai Province. A couple of statues have the dates of 1227b and 1228. These statues were collectively designated as an Important Cultural Property of Japan on June 7, 1999.

==== Daizen-ji Nikkō Bosatsu and Gakkō Bosatsu ====
In addition to the Nikkō Bosatsu and Gakkō Bosatsu which are part of the main image Yakushi Nyōrai, Daizen-ji has two larger statues of these divinities located outside the main altar, These statues were carved in the Kamakura period in the yosegi-zukuri technique with crystal inset eyes, and are in the style of the Kei school, and thus are contemporary with the statues of the Jūni Shinshō. The Nikkō Bosatsu is 248 cm tall, and the Gakkō Bosatsu is 247 cm tall. Inside, the statues were found to be stuffed with scrolls containing prayers and petitions from the Kamakura period. The statues and the documents found therein were collectively designated as an Important Cultural Property of Japan in June 2007.

=== Intangible Cultural Property ===
The Wisteria Cutting Festival (藤切り祭) held every year on May 8 celebrates a mythological event in which En no Gyōja, a mountain ascetic, saved the lives of the local people by killing a large serpent. This festival is designated an intangible cultural asset.

== Gallery ==
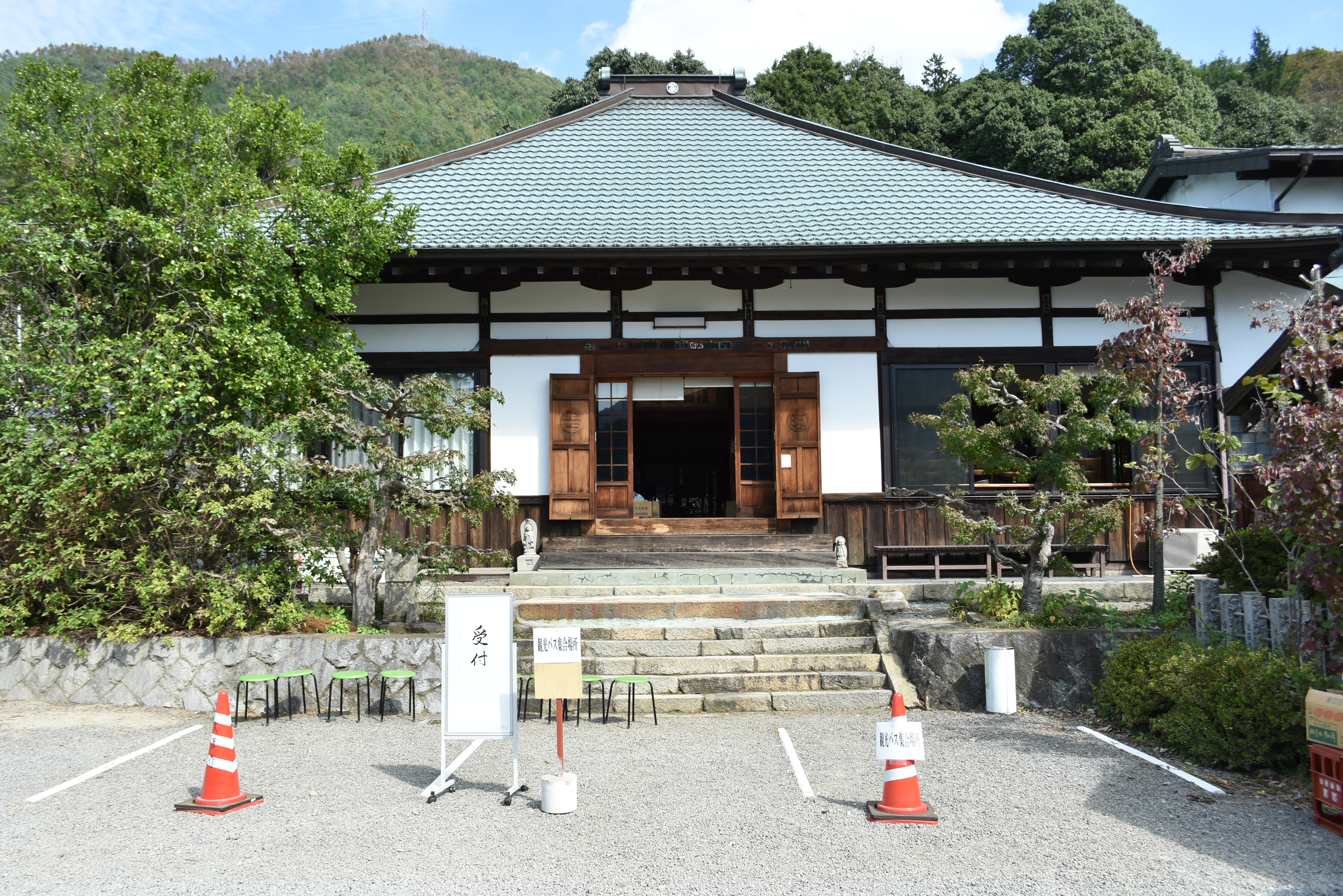
Daizen-ji panorama

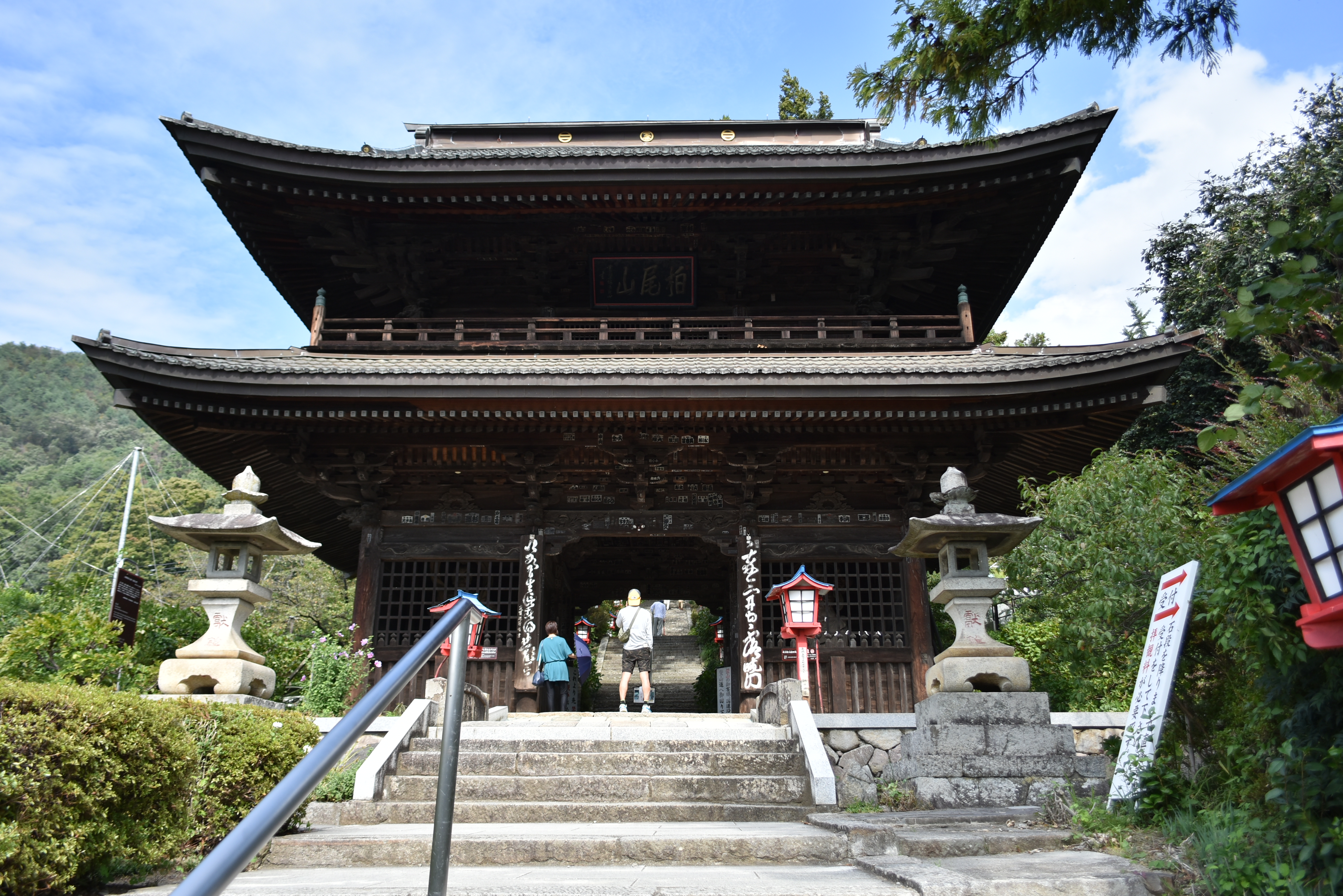
Sanmon

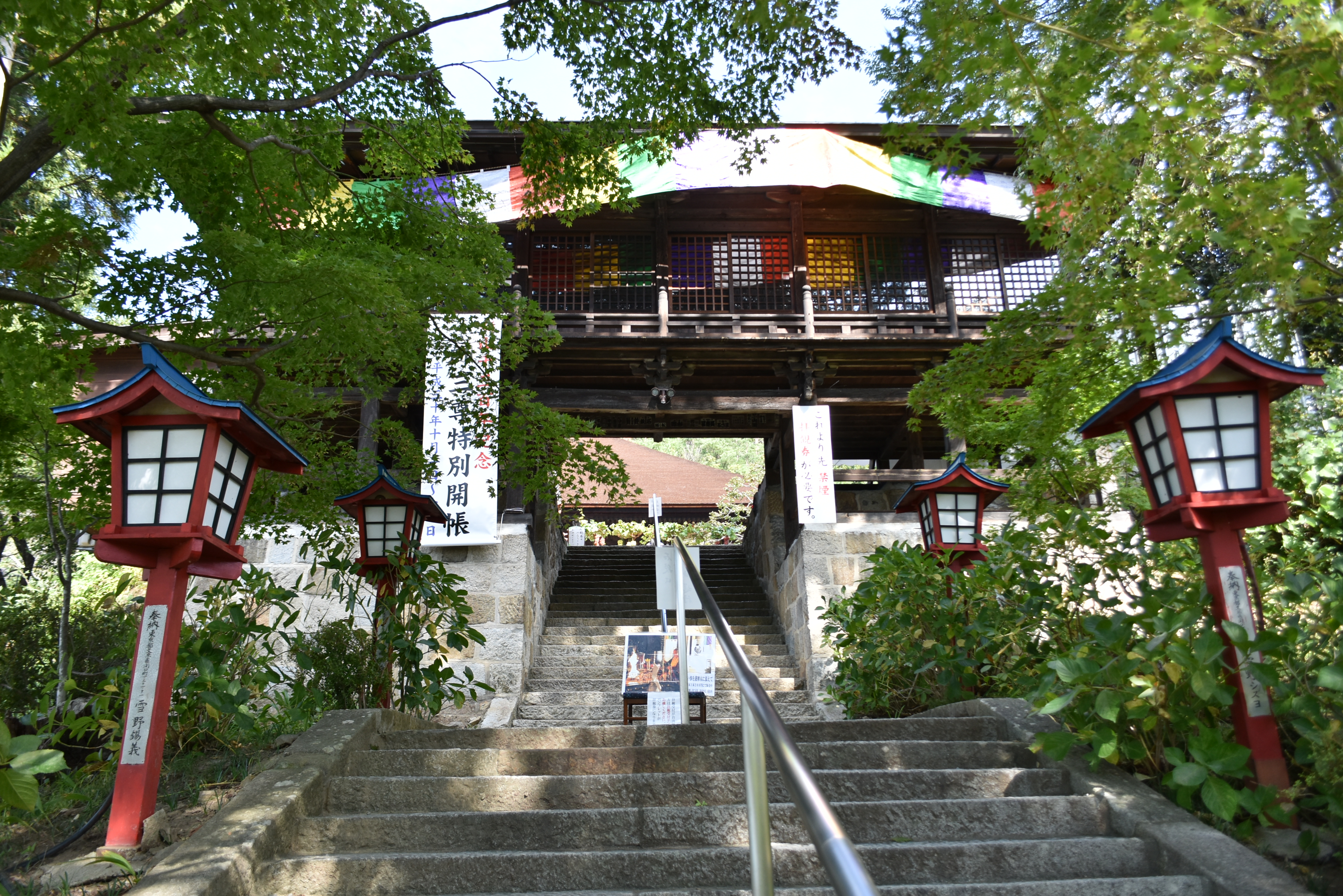
Rakuya-dō

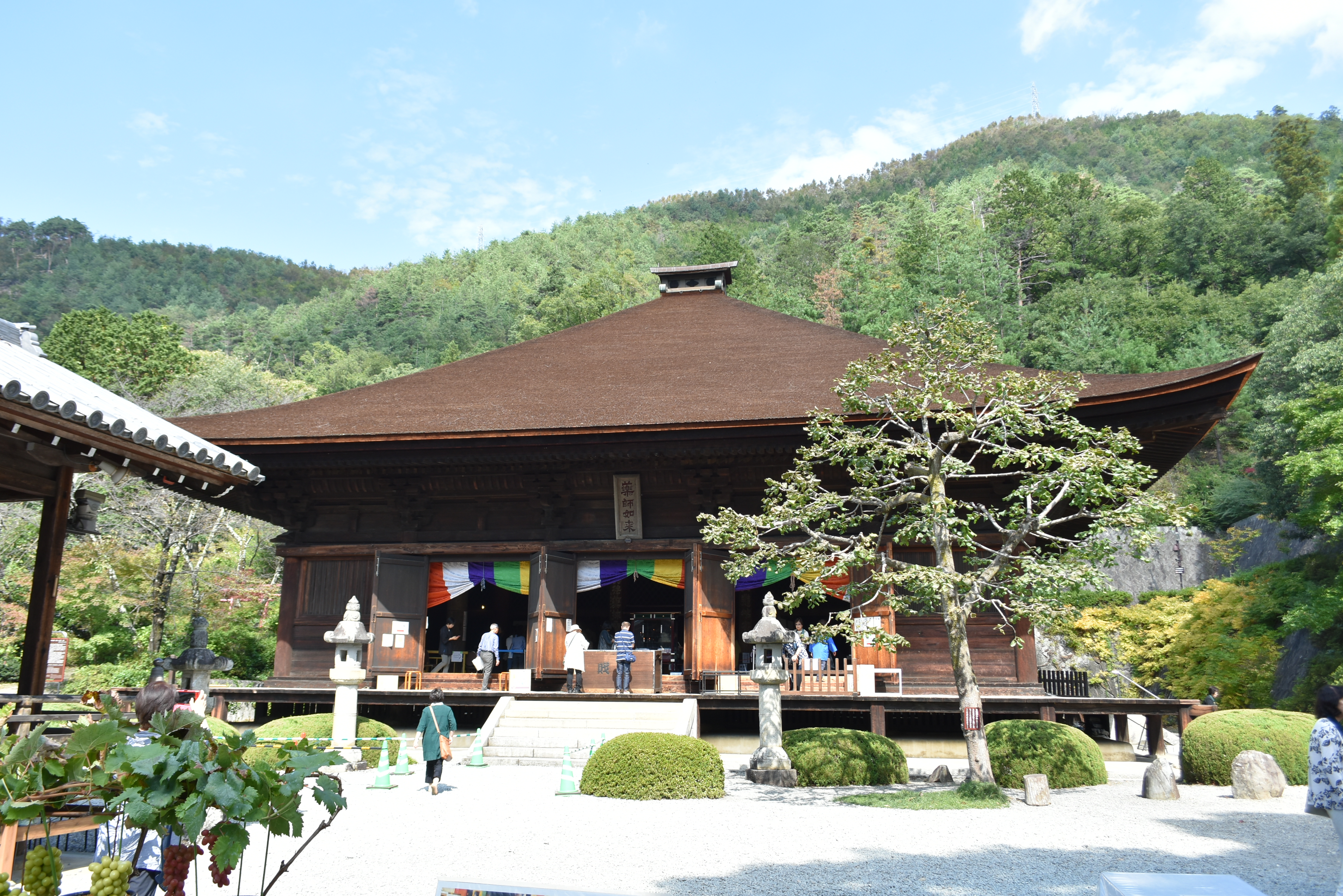
Hondō (Yakushi-dō)

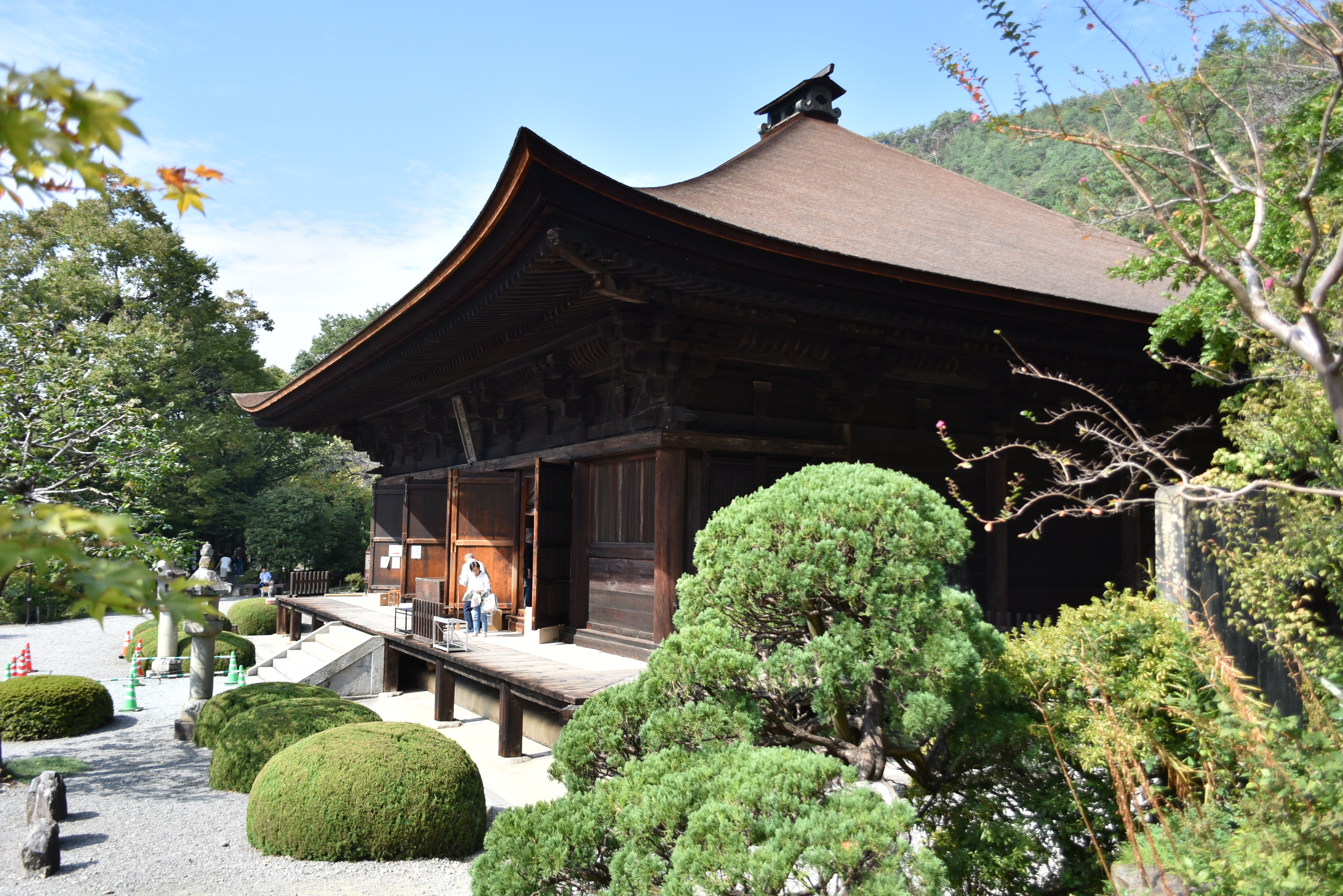
Hondō (Yakushi-dō)

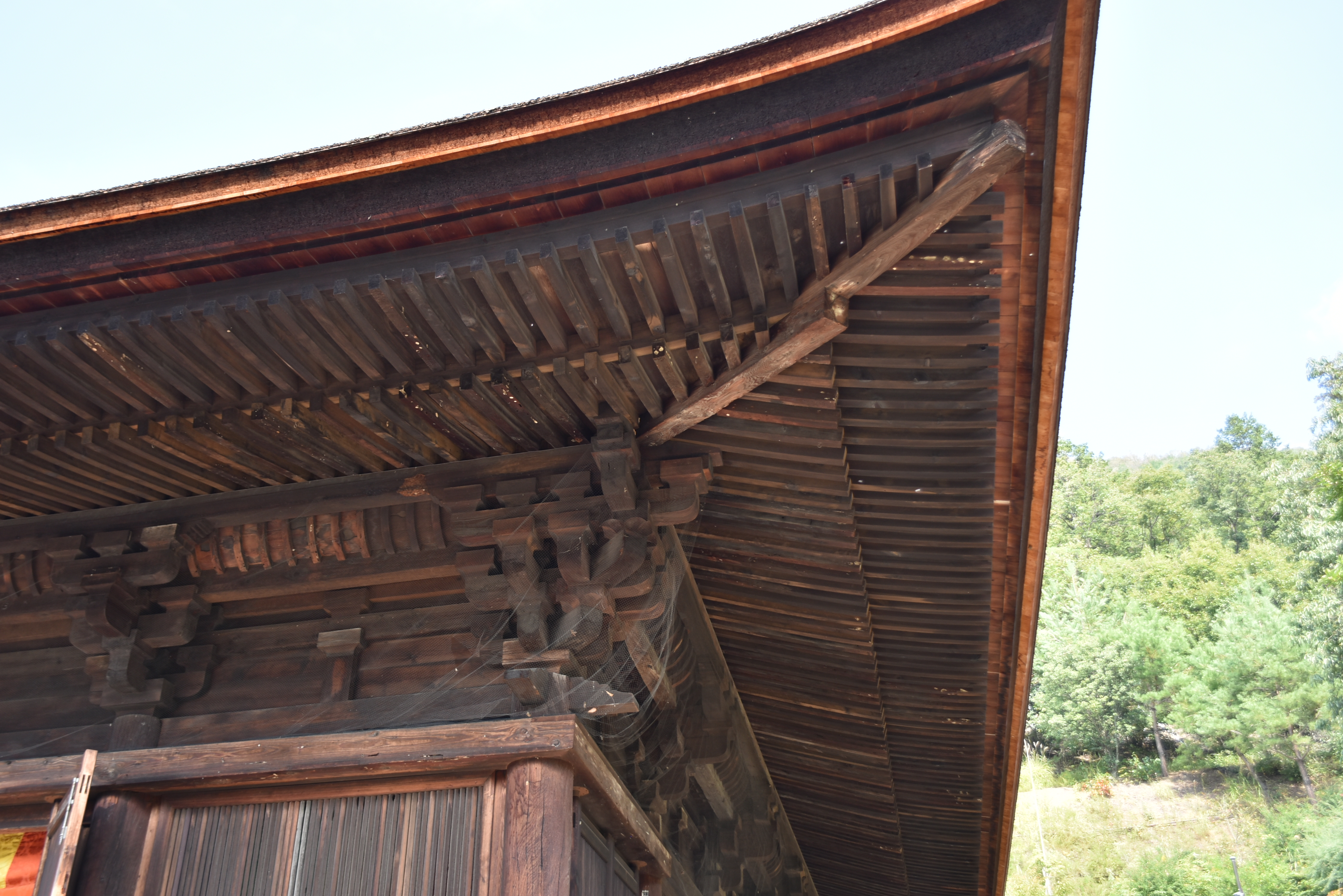
Hondō (Yakushi-dō) interior

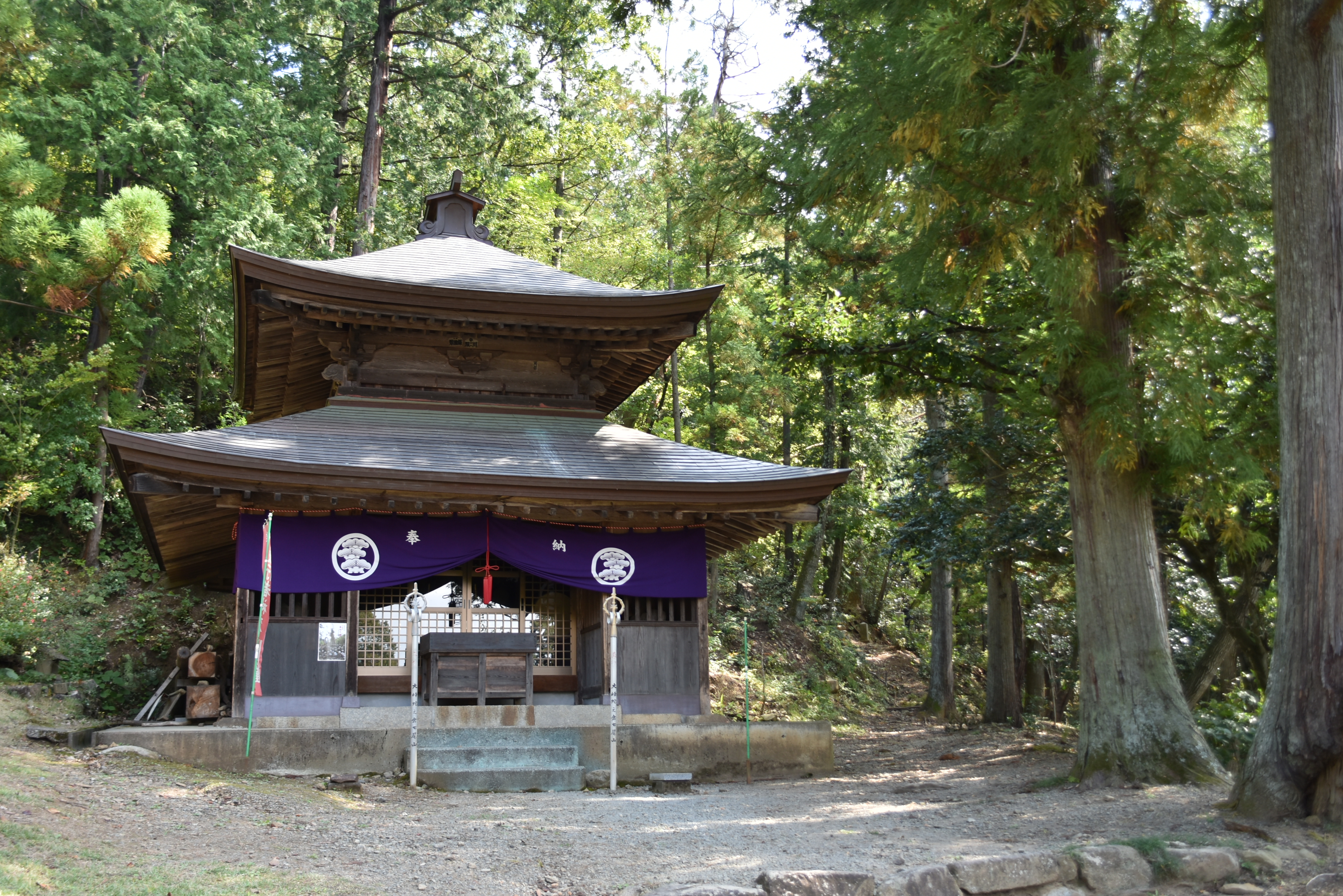
Gyōja-dō

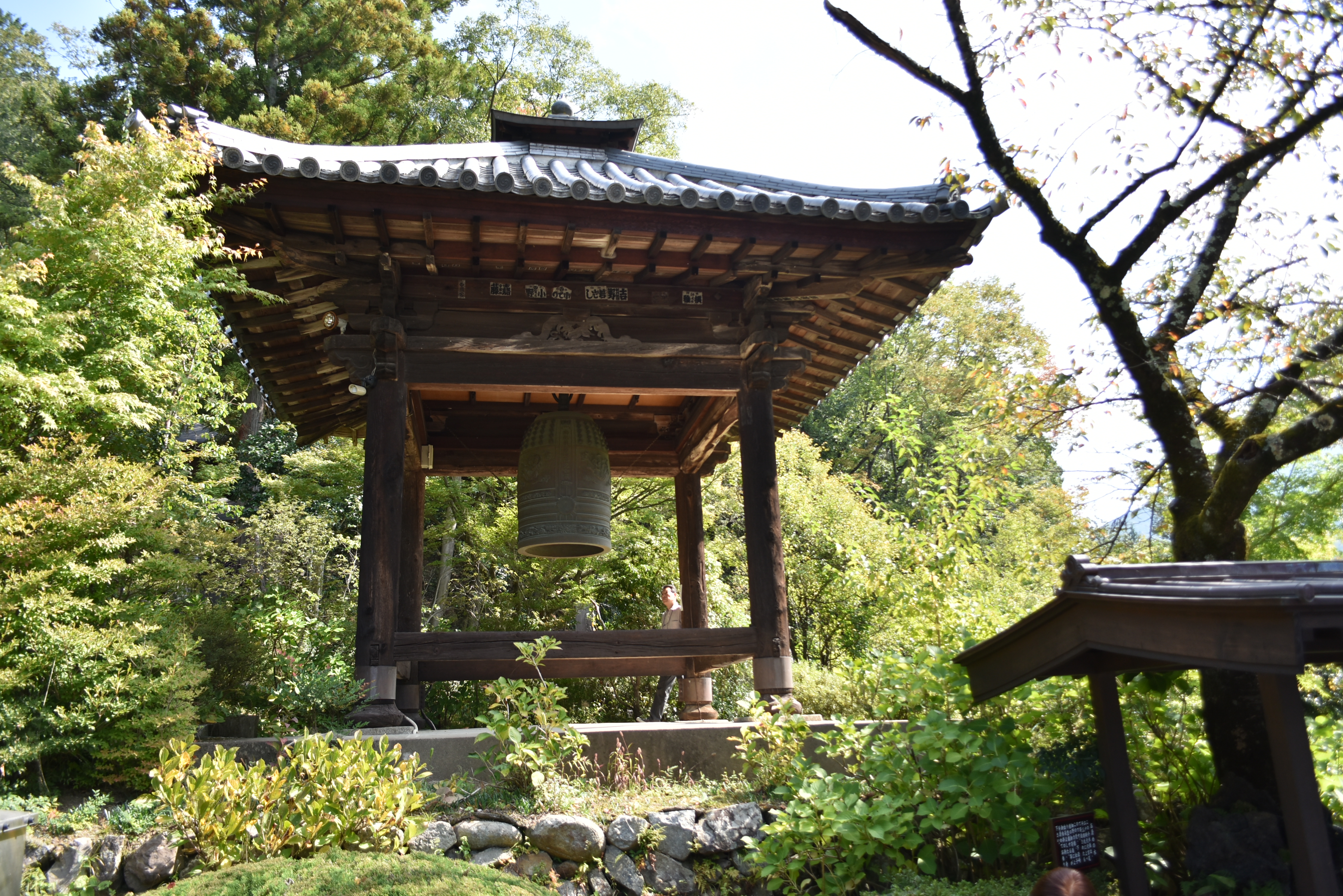
Belfry

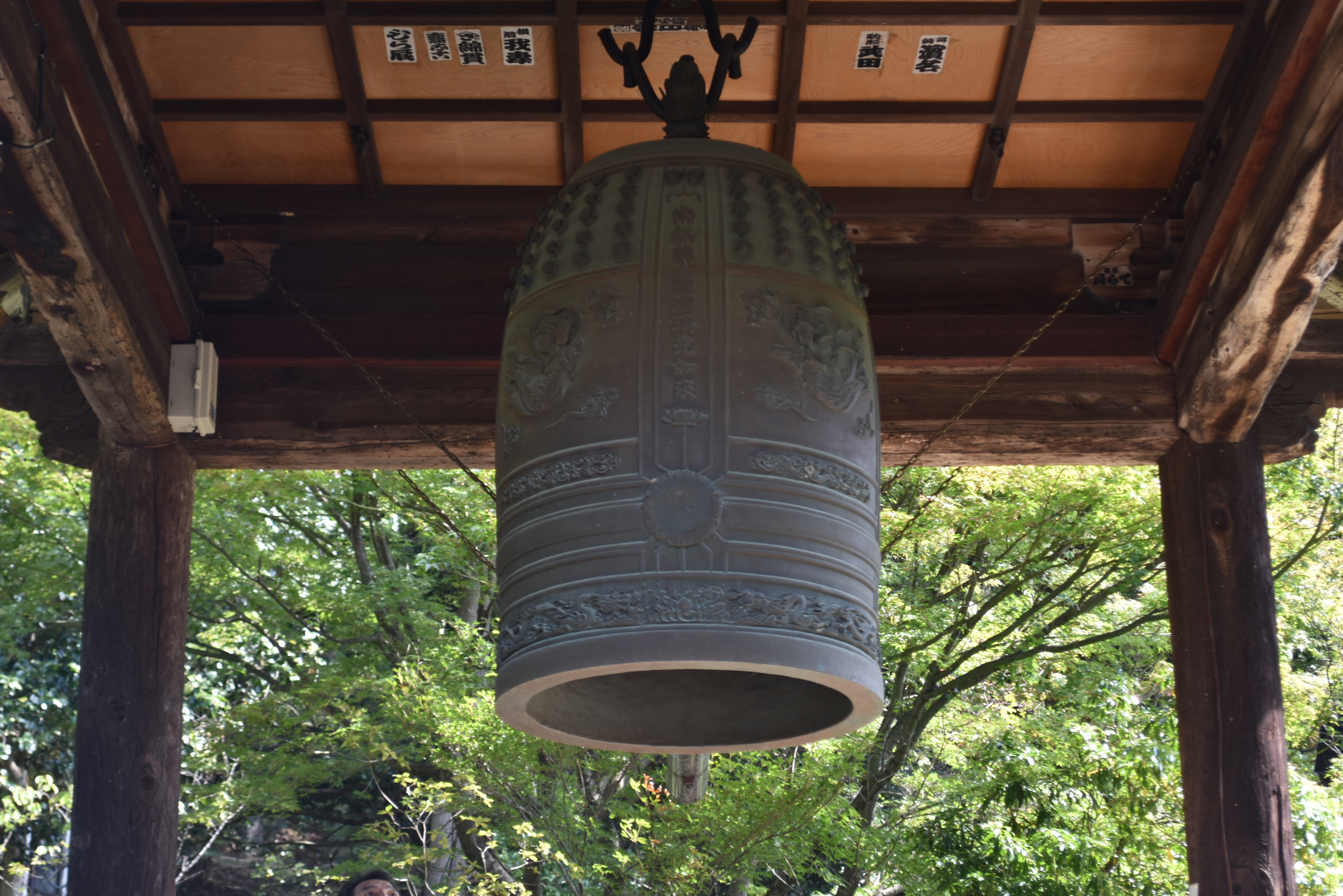
Bell

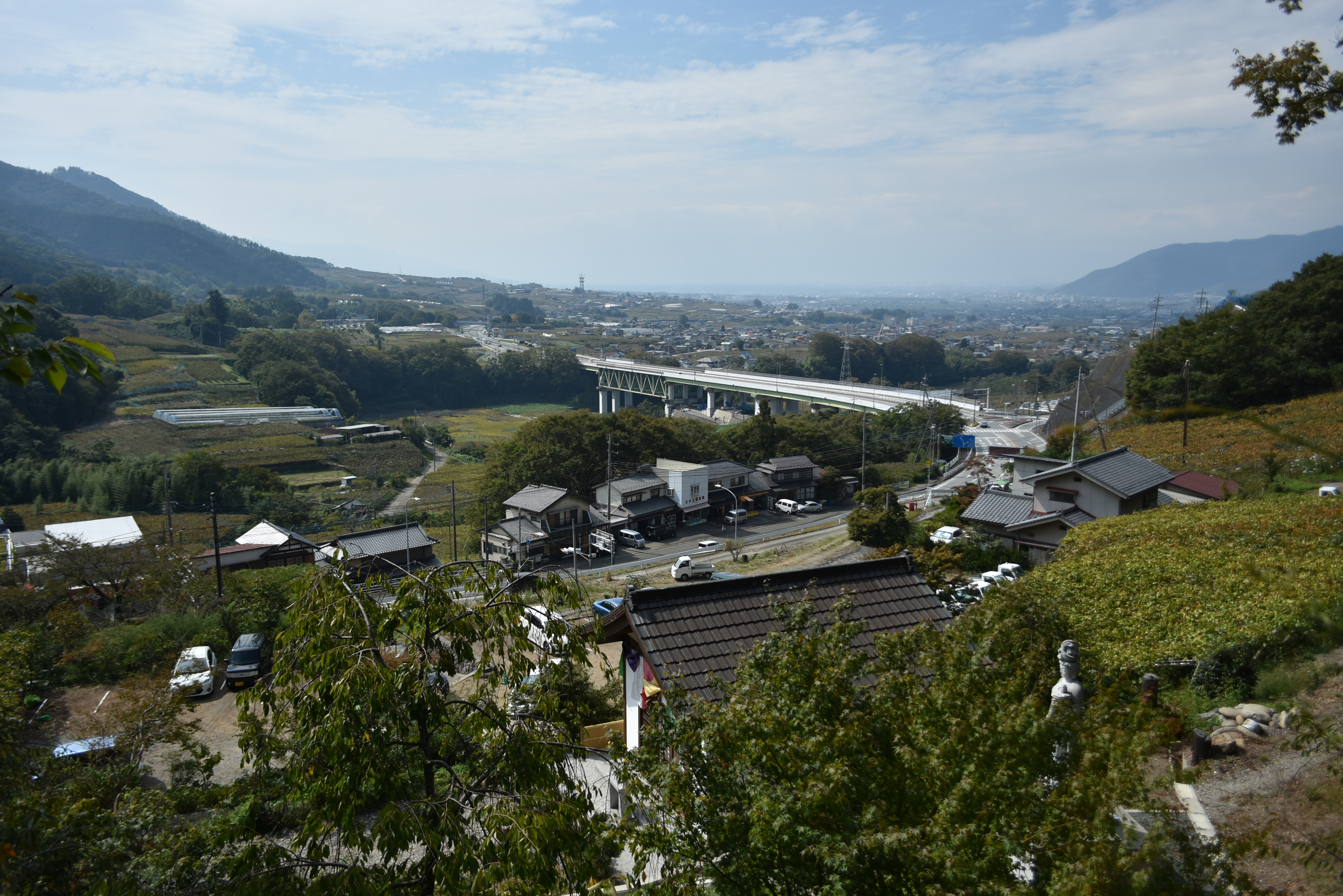
View of Katsunuma from Daizen-ji
