= Chishaku-in =

Buddhist temple in Kyoto, Japan

Coordinates: 34.9881°N 135.7764°E

- 智積院
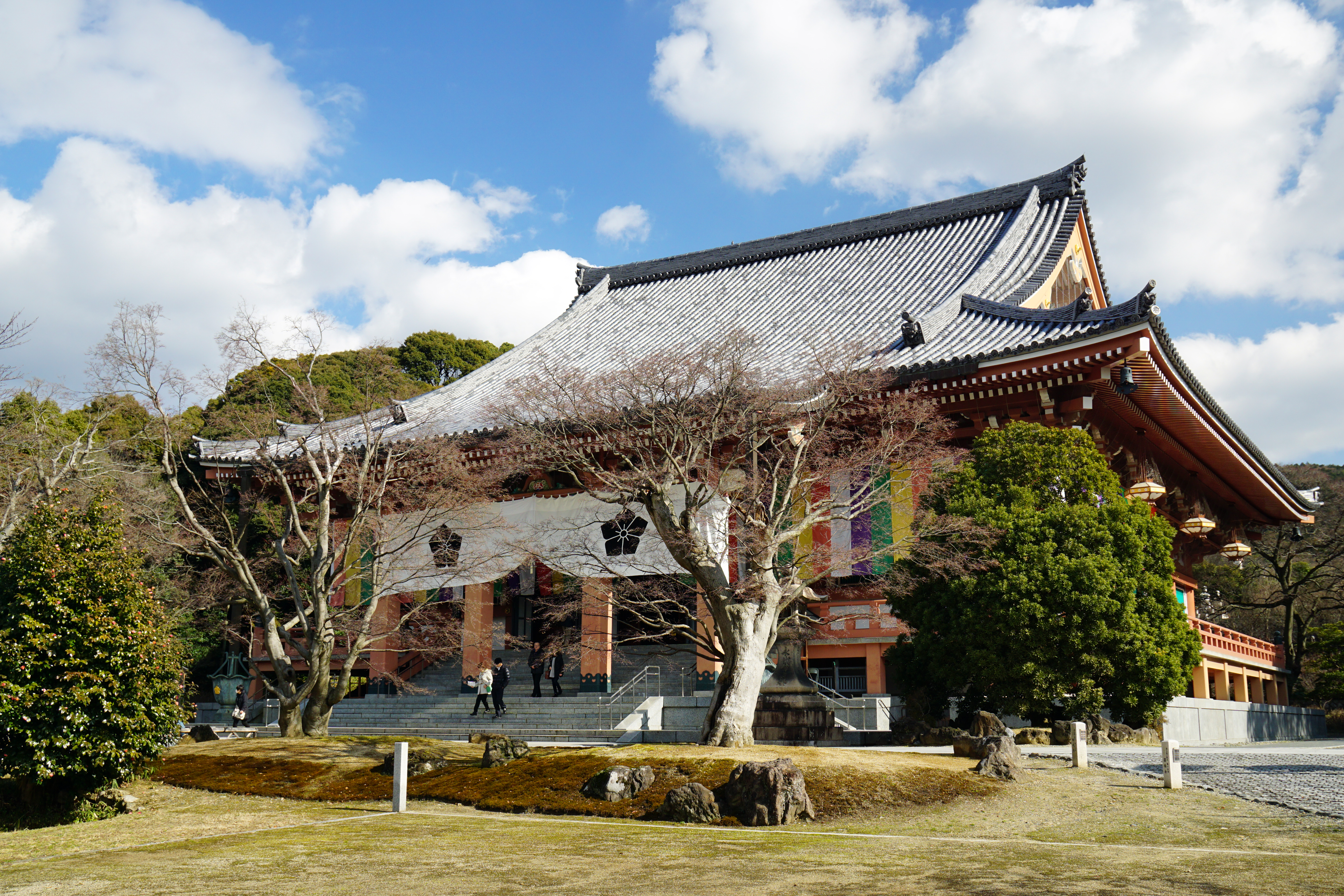
- Main hall of Chishaku-in

- Location within Japan

Religion
- Affiliation: Buddhist
- Sect: Shingon-shū Chisan-ha

Location
- Location: Higashiyama-ku, Kyoto
- Country: Japan
- Interactive map of Chishaku-in

Architecture
- Established: 1601

Website
- Official website

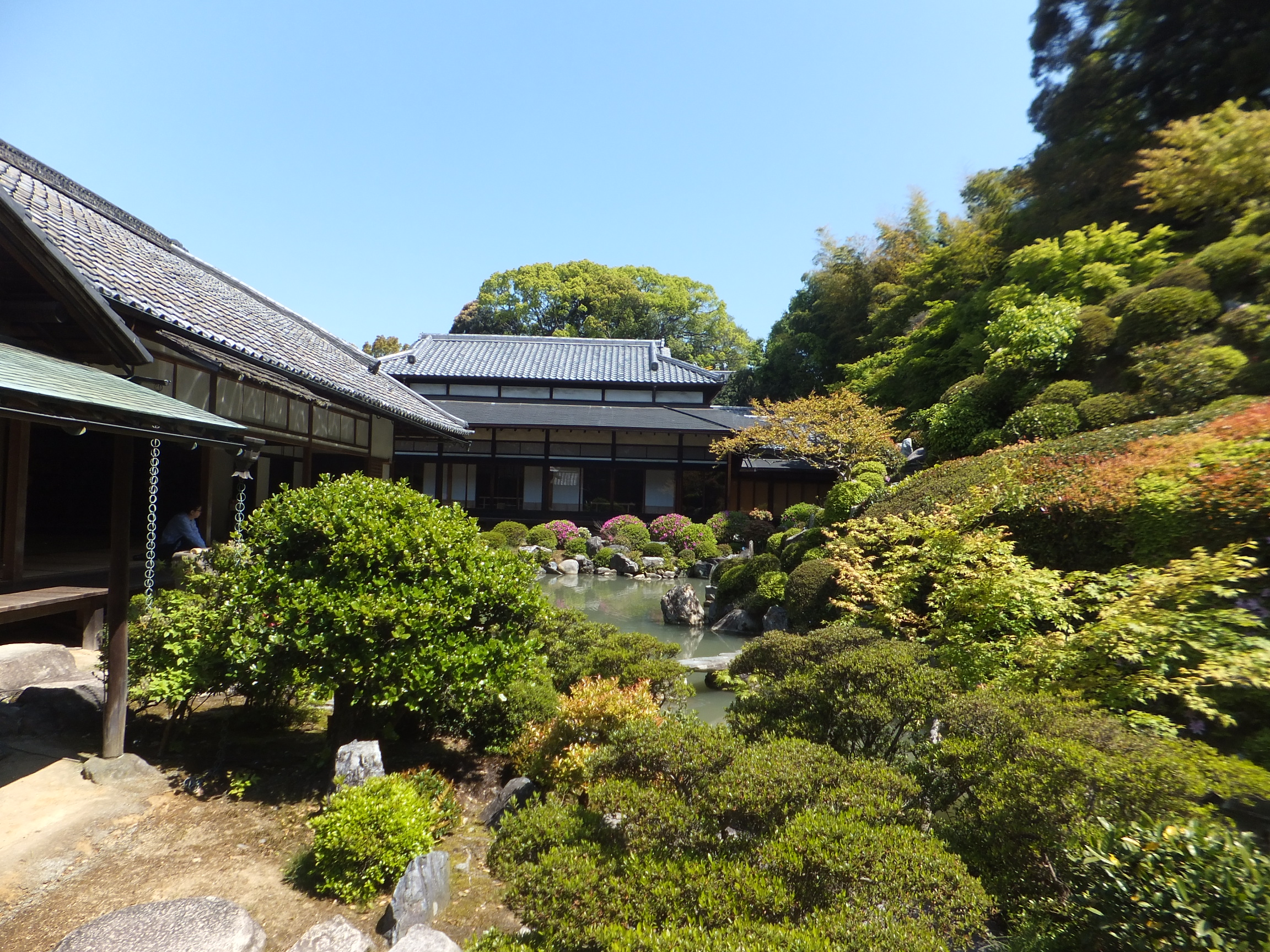
Garden

Chishaku-in (智積院) is a Buddhist temple in Higashiyama-ku, Kyoto, Japan. It is affiliated with Shingon-shū Chisan-ha Buddhism. It was established in 1601.

The temple has a historic garden that was said to be a favourite of Sen no Rikyū.

The Nihonga artist Inshō Dōmoto received a commission from the monastery to paint new sliding doors facing the famous garden. "Ladies at Tea" from 1958 shows a more western-style painting of two women enjoying tea. The left side is a woman in kimono, while the lady to the right is in western dress. The four sliding doors were a departure from the traditional style.

== See also ==
- Thirteen Buddhist Sites of Kyoto
