= Ninna-ji =

Historic Buddhist temple in Kyoto, Japan

- 仁和寺
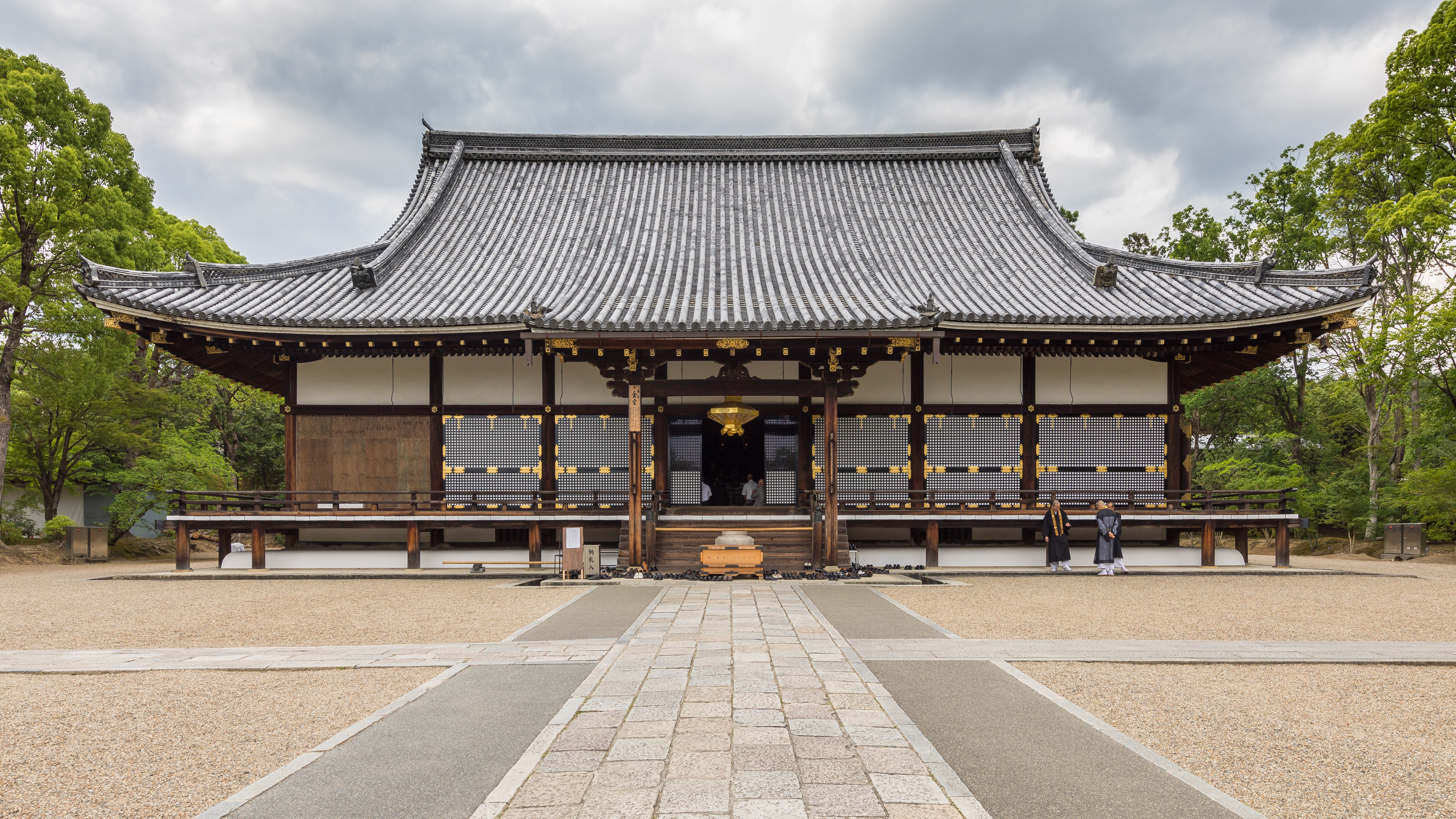
- Kondo-dō (Main Hall)

- Location within Kyoto Prefecture Location within Japan

Religion
- Affiliation: Buddhist
- Deity: Amida Nyorai (Amitābha)
- Rite: Shingon-shu Omuro-ha
- Status: functional

Location
- Location: 1 33 Ōuchi Omuro, Ukyō-ku, Kyoto-shi, Kyoto-fu
- Country: Japan
- Coordinates: {35°01′51.8″N 135°42′49.7″E

Architecture
- Founder: Emperor Uda
- Completed: 888
- UNESCO World Heritage Site
- Type: Cultural
- Criteria: (ii), (iv)
- Designated: 1994
- Reference no.: 688
- National Treasure of Japan

Website
- https://ninnaji.jp/
- Important Cultural Property National Place of Scenic Beauty National Historic Site of Japan

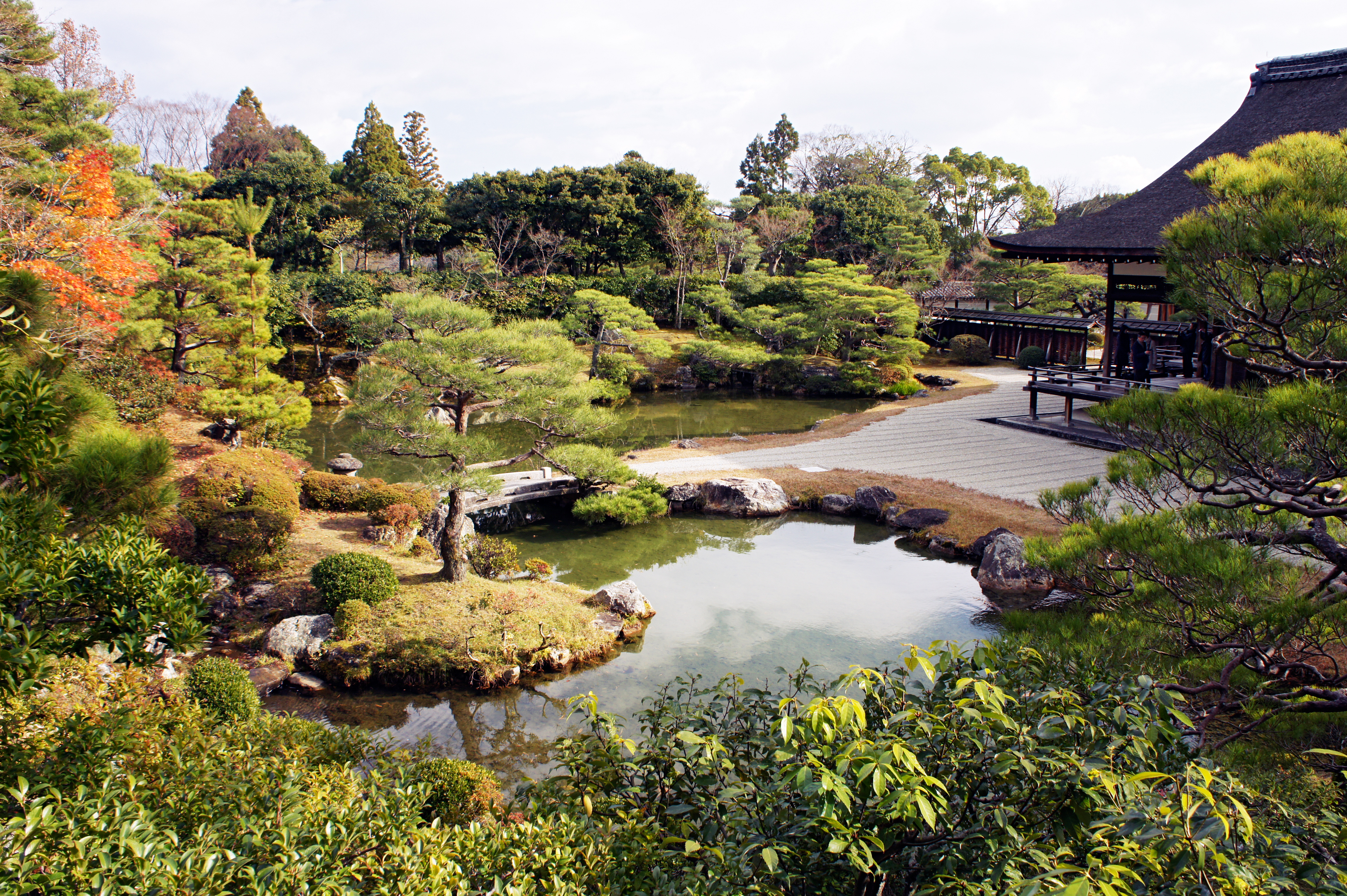
Shinden's North Garden

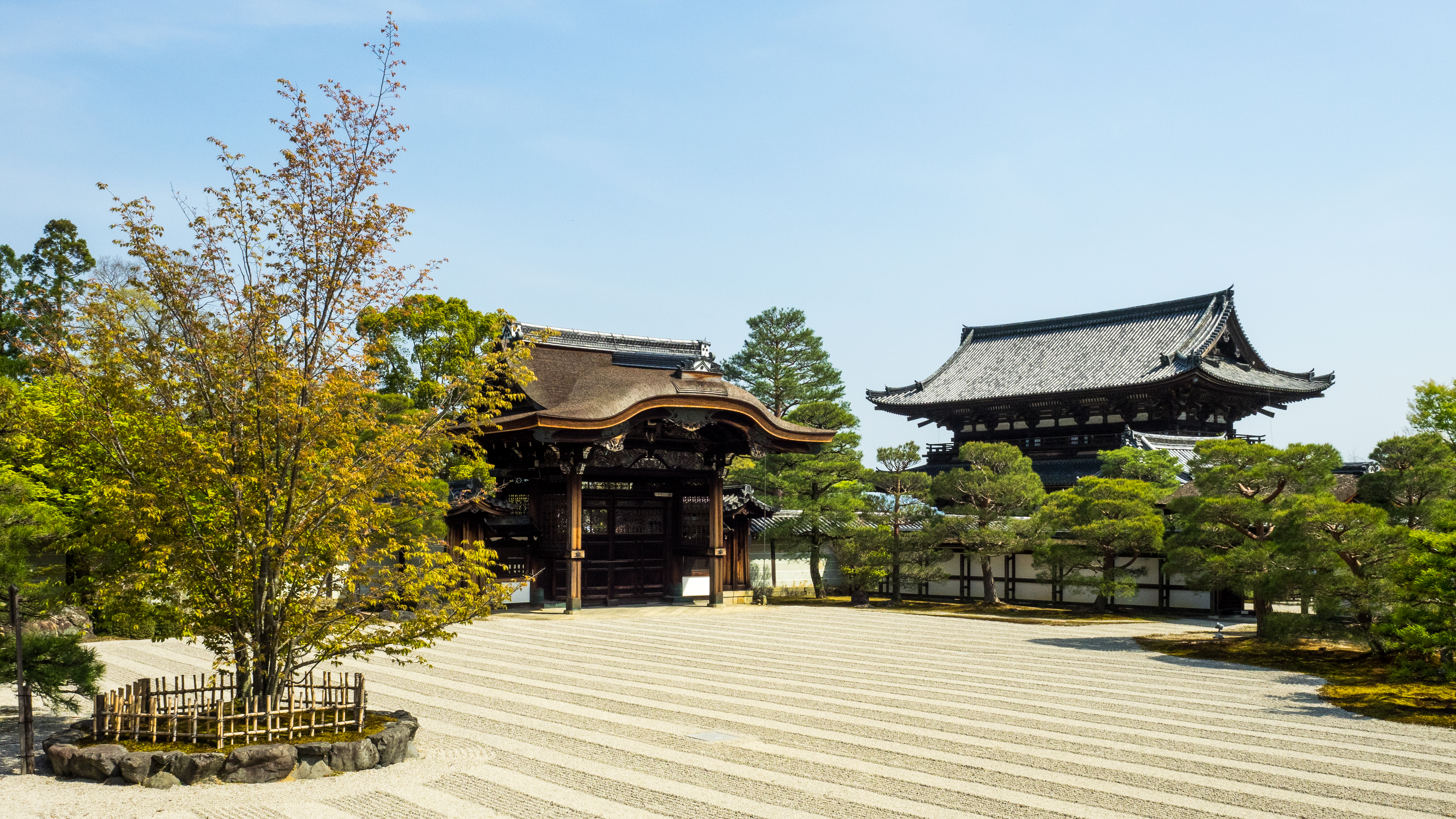
Shinden's South Garden

Ninna-ji (仁和寺, Ninna-ji) is the head temple of the Omuro school of the Shingon Sect of Buddhism. Located in western Kyoto, Japan, it was first founded in AD 888 by Emperor Uda, and was later reconstructed in the 17th century. It is part of the Historic Monuments of Ancient Kyoto, a UNESCO World Heritage Site.

Ninna-ji was a monzeki temple with deep ties to the Imperial family and was called the "Omuro Gosho" (Omuro Imperial Palace) until the Meiji Restoration. It is also a famous sakura viewing location in spring, attracting many visitors. The temple is also the head temple of the Omuro-ryu school of ikebana (flower arrangement), which was founded by Emperor Uda. The Omuro Cherry Blossoms and the Ninna-ji Imperial Palace Gardens are nationally designated Place of Scenic Beauty and the site of the Ninna-ji Imperial Palace is a National Historic Site.

== History ==
Construction of Ninna-ji began in the early Heian period, in 886, at the behest of Emperor Kōkō. However, Emperor Kōkō died the following year before the temple was completed, and it was completed during the reign of his son, Emperor Uda, in 888. Initially called "Nishiyama Goganji" (西山御願寺), it was later renamed Ninna-ji after the era name. The first head priest was Yūsen of the Tendai sect. However, in October 899, Emperor Uda became a monk at this temple and following November, he converted to the Shingon sect at Tō-ji Upon his conversion, the head priest of Ninna-ji was replaced by Kanken of the Shingon sect, and the temple has remained Shingon to this day. In 904, the retired emperor built a monks' quarters called "Omuro" southwest of the temple grounds and began residing there. Subsequently, the temple's abbots were descendants of Emperor Uda. In April 952, Emperor Suzaku moved to the temple and died here in August of the same year.

Prince Shōshin, a son of Emperor Sanjō, was appointed to the newly created position of Kengyō, above the abbot. From this point onward, Ninna-ji came to be regarded as a temple for the sons of the imperial family. Only two individuals who were not of imperial lineage became abbots of Ninna-ji: Hōsuke, son of Kujō Michiie, and Hōson, son of Ashikaga Yoshimitsu.

In 1010, the Kannon-in Kanjo-dō was built at the request of Minamoto no Rinshi, wife of Fujiwara no Michinaga. In April 1119, the main hall, east and west corridors, bell tower, sutra repository, three-sided monks' quarters, Kannon-in, and Kankō-in were destroyed by fire. However, the main hall was quickly rebuilt in December, and Kannon-in and Kankō-in were also rebuilt in 1122. In 1144, the Kujaku Myōō-dō (Peacock King Hall) was built at the behest of Emperor Toba. During the Muromachi period, the temple declined somewhat, but when the Ōnin War (1467–1477) broke out, it was burned down by the Eastern Army's soldiers, and completely destroyed. However, before the damage occurred, the principal image, an Amida Triad, and other items had been moved to Shinkō-in, a temple affiliated with the main hall, and thus escaped destruction. After this, the temple, along with its principal image, moved its base to Saihō-ji, located at the western foot of Futago-oka.

In 1591, the temple received a land grant of 860 koku from Toyotomi Hideyoshi and then in 1617, it received another grant of 1,500 koku from Shogun Tokugawa Hidetada.

According to the "Ninna-ji Goden" (Biography of Ninna-ji), on July 24, 1634, the 21st abbot of Ninna-ji, Prince Kakushin (the eldest son of Emperor Go-Yōzei), requested the reconstruction of Ninna-ji from Shogun Tokugawa Iemitsu, who was in Kyoto at the time, and was granted the request. Furthermore, during the Kan'ei era (1624–1645), the reconstruction of the Kyoto Imperial Palace led to the bestowal of the Shishinden (present-day Kondō), Seiryoden (present-day Mikage-do), and Jōgoten from the Imperial Palace being relocated to the temple grounds. The reconstruction of the temple complex was finally completed in 1646. In 1867, the 30th abbot, Prince Junnin, renounced his monastic vows and became Prince Komatsu. This marked the end of the temple's history as a monzeki temple. Furthermore, in 1887, the Shishinden (main hall) and other palace buildings were destroyed by fire, but they were rebuilt in 1914.

Following January 20, 1945, when Japan's defeat in the Pacific War became increasingly likely, former Prime Minister Fumimaro Konoe visited the temple several times to discuss the possibility of Emperor Hirohito abdicating and become a monk at Ninna-ji. The kanji characters on the plaque "Reimeiden" displayed in the Reimeiden Hall are said to be the last calligraphy Konoe wrote during his visit to the temple.

Most of the surviving buildings of Nanna-ji date from the 17th century, and include a five-story pagoda and an orchard of late blooming dwarf cherry trees called the Omuro cherry trees that would grow to around 2–3 meters (10 feet) in height. The temple itself features some beautifully painted screen walls, and a beautiful walled garden.

== Cultural Properties ==
=== National Treasures ===
- Kondō (金堂), Edo period (1613). Originally the Shishinden, the throne hall of the Kyoto Imperial Palace built in 1613, it was relocated during the Kan'ei era (1624–1644) and is important as a surviving example of early modern Shinden-zukuri architecture. Although modifications were made, such as changing the roof from hinoki cypress bark to tile, to accommodate the change in use from a palace to a Buddhist hall, it retains many of the design elements of palace architecture, such as the lattice-like shutters and golden decorative metal fittings.
- Wooden seated statue of Amida Nyorai and Two Attendants (木造阿弥陀如来及両脇侍像) Heian period. Originally enshrined in the Kondo, it is now moved to the Treasure Hall within the temple grounds. It is said to be the principal image from the time of the temple's founding in 888.
- Wooden statue of seated Yakushi Nyorai (木造薬師如来坐像) Heian period. - The principal image of the Reimeiden (a hall enshrining the memorial tablets of successive abbots of Ninna-ji), located on the north side of the main temple building. Its outline was first revealed in 1986 through an investigation by the Kyoto National Museum, and it was designated a National Treasure in 1990. It was created in 1103 by the Buddhist sculptors Ensei and Choen at the request of Prince Kakugyo, son of Emperor Shirakawa. The statue itself is 11 centimeters tall, and including the halo and base, it is about 24 centimeters tall. It is a small sandalwood statue, and the halo depicts the Seven Medicine Buddhas, along with Nikkō Bosatsu and Gakkō Bosatsu. The base is meticulously crafted, with three figures of the Twelve Heavenly Generals on each side (front, back, left, and right).
- Painted Silk Scroll of Peacock King (絹本著色孔雀明王像), Northern Song dynasty. At Ninna-ji, the "Peacock Sutra Ritual" has been performed since ancient times as a ceremony to appease natural disasters, and this image is said to have been used as the principal image during that ritual.
- Hōsōge Makie Jewel Box (宝相華) early Heian period - A lacquerware item from the early Heian period. Valuable as an early example of makie (lacquerware with gold or silver inlay).
- Thirty-Volume Sutras (30 volumes) (三十帖冊子) with Hōsōge Kalavinka Makie Soku (宝相華迦陵頻伽蒔絵〓冊子箱) Heian period. The "Thirty-Volume Sutras" are 30 small booklets (each about 10 centimeters in length and width) of sutras that Kūkai brought back from Tang China, some of which are in Kūkai's own handwriting. They have been highly valued as treasures of the Shingon sect since ancient times. The accompanying box was bestowed by the imperial court and is a valuable example of Heian period lacquerware.
- Omuro Shōjōki (6 volumes) (御室相承記 6巻), Kamakura period - Records of successive imperial princes of Ninna-ji.
- Emperor Takakura Imperial Letter (高倉天皇宸翰消息（附:守覚法親王消息)) Heian period (1178). This is the only surviving writing by Emperor Takakura, who died young, at the age of 18.
- Emperor Go-Saga's Imperial Letter (後嵯峨天皇宸翰消息) Kamakura period (1246) - The only verifiable surviving writing by Emperor Go-Saga.
- Huangdi Neijing Mingtang, Volume 1 (黄帝内経明堂 巻第一 2巻) (2 volumes, copied in Einin 4 and Eitoku 3), Huangdi Neijing Taisu, 23 volumes (黄帝内経太素) (copied in Nin'an 2 and Nin'an 3) - Commentaries on the Chinese medical text, Huangdi Neijing.
- Ishinpō, Volumes 1, 5, 7, 9, and 10 (5 volumes) (医心方 巻第一、第五、第七、第九、第十残巻 5帖) late Heian period. This is a manuscript of Ishinpō, Japan's oldest medical text.
- Newly Revised Materia Medica, Volumes 4, 5, 12, 17, and 19 (5 volumes) (新修本草 巻第四、第五、第十二、第十七、第十九 5巻) - Kamakura period. A manuscript of the Tang dynasty book on medicinal herbs, "Newly Revised Materia Medica."

=== Important Cultural Properties ===
==== Structures ====
Fourteen structure of Ninna-ji are designated as National Important Cultural Properties.

  - 5-story Pagoda (五重塔), Edo Period (1644), height = 36.18 meters
  - Kannon-dō (観音堂), Edo Period (1641 to 1645).
  - Chūmon (中門), Edo Period (1641 to 1645).
  - Kyōzō (経蔵), Edo Period (1641 to 1645), Built in the Zen Buddhist style, this revolving sutra repository houses a total of 768 sutra boxes.
  - Niō-mon (二王門), Edo Period (1641 to 1645).
  - Shōrō (鐘楼), Edo Period (1641 to 1645).
  - Miei-dō (御影堂), Edo Period (1641 to 1645). Constructed using materials from the Seiryo-den Hall of the Kyoto Imperial Palace, which was built in 1613, it enshrines statues of the sect's founder, Kōbō Daishi, the temple's founder, Emperor Uda, and Prince Shoshin, the second head priest of Ninna-ji.
  - Miei-dō Chūmon (御影堂中門), Edo Period (1641 to 1645).
  - Honbō Omotemon (本坊表門), Edo Period (1641 to 1645).
  - Ryōkaku-tei (遼廓亭), Edo Period (1661–1750). A chashitsu relocated from the residence of the Edo period painter Ogata Kōrin between 1661 and 1750. It is considered unusual for having a wing wall under the sloping roof and a crawl-through entrance opening inside.
  - Hitō-tei (飛濤亭), Edo Period (1830–1867). A chashitsu built for Emperor Kōkaku with a high entrance with a lintel so that guests could enter without having to bend down.
  - Kyūsho-myōjin (九所明神), Edo Period (1641–1645). A Shinto shrine protecting the temple grounds of Ninna-ji. Originally located south of the temple grounds, it was moved to its current location in 1212. It consists of the Honden (center), for worship of the kami of Iwashimizu Hachiman-gu, the Left Sanctuary for worship of the kami of the Kamo shrines and the Right Sanctuary for the worship of the kami of Matsunoo Taisha, Hirano Shrine and others.

== Gallery ==
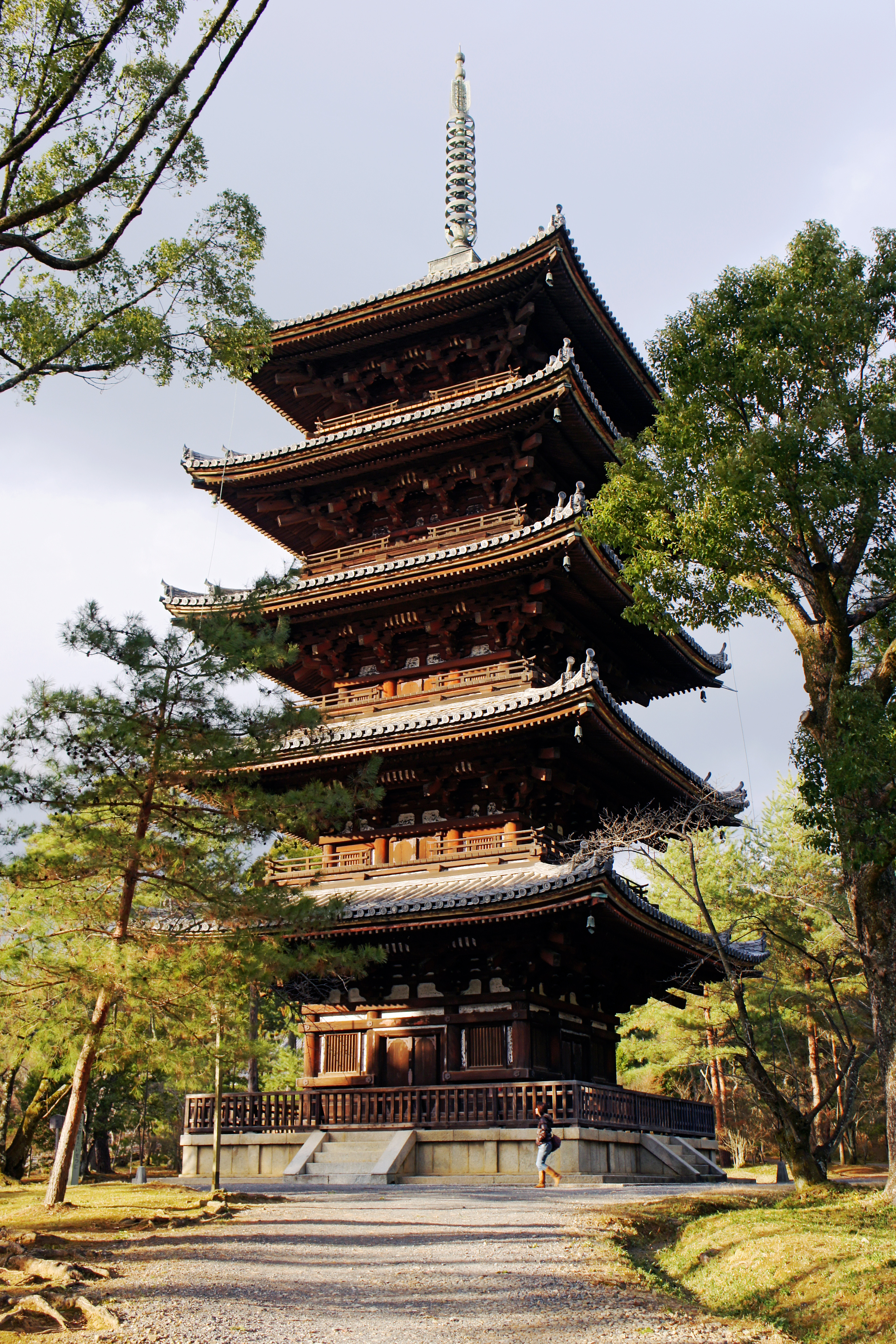
Pagoda

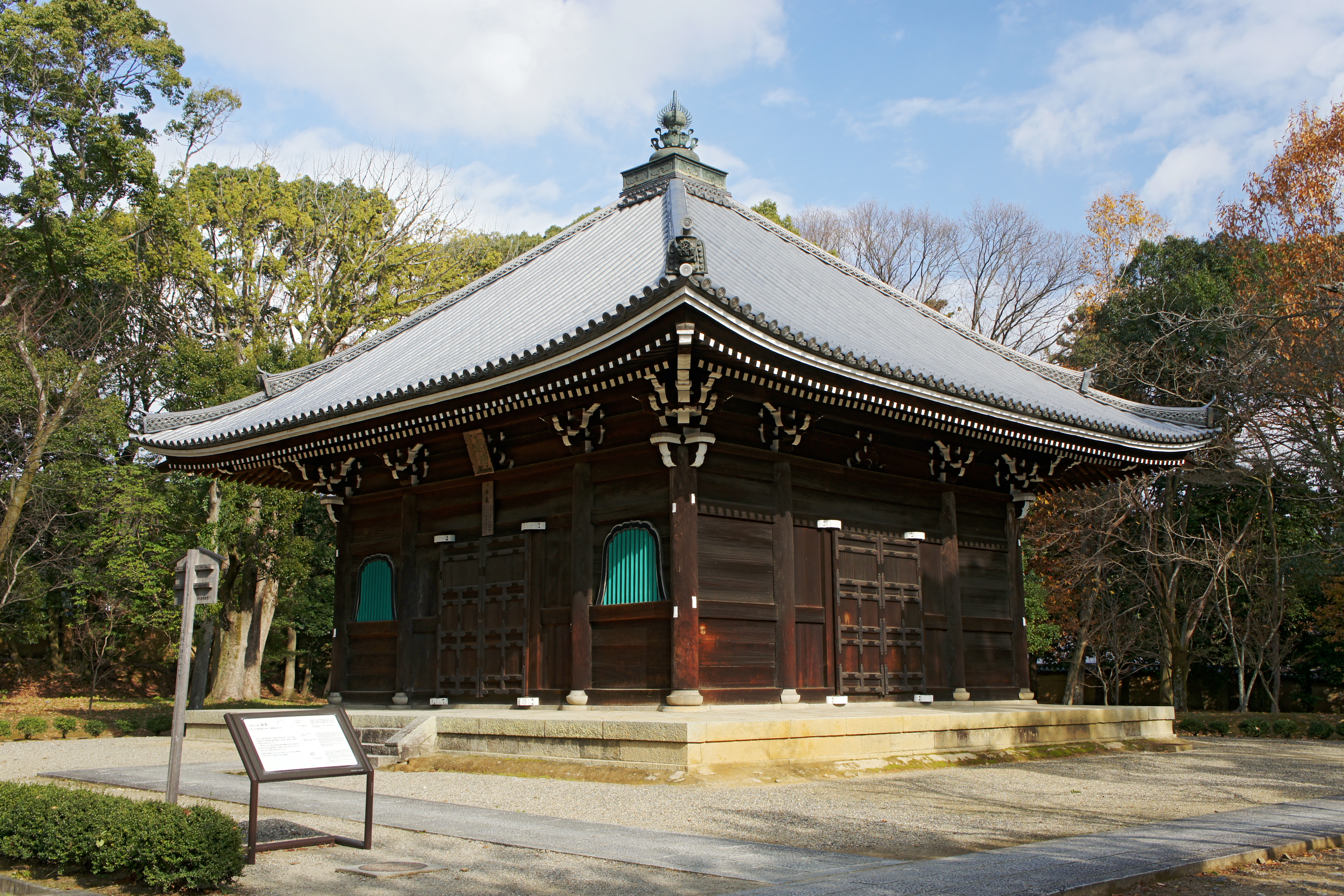
Kyōzō

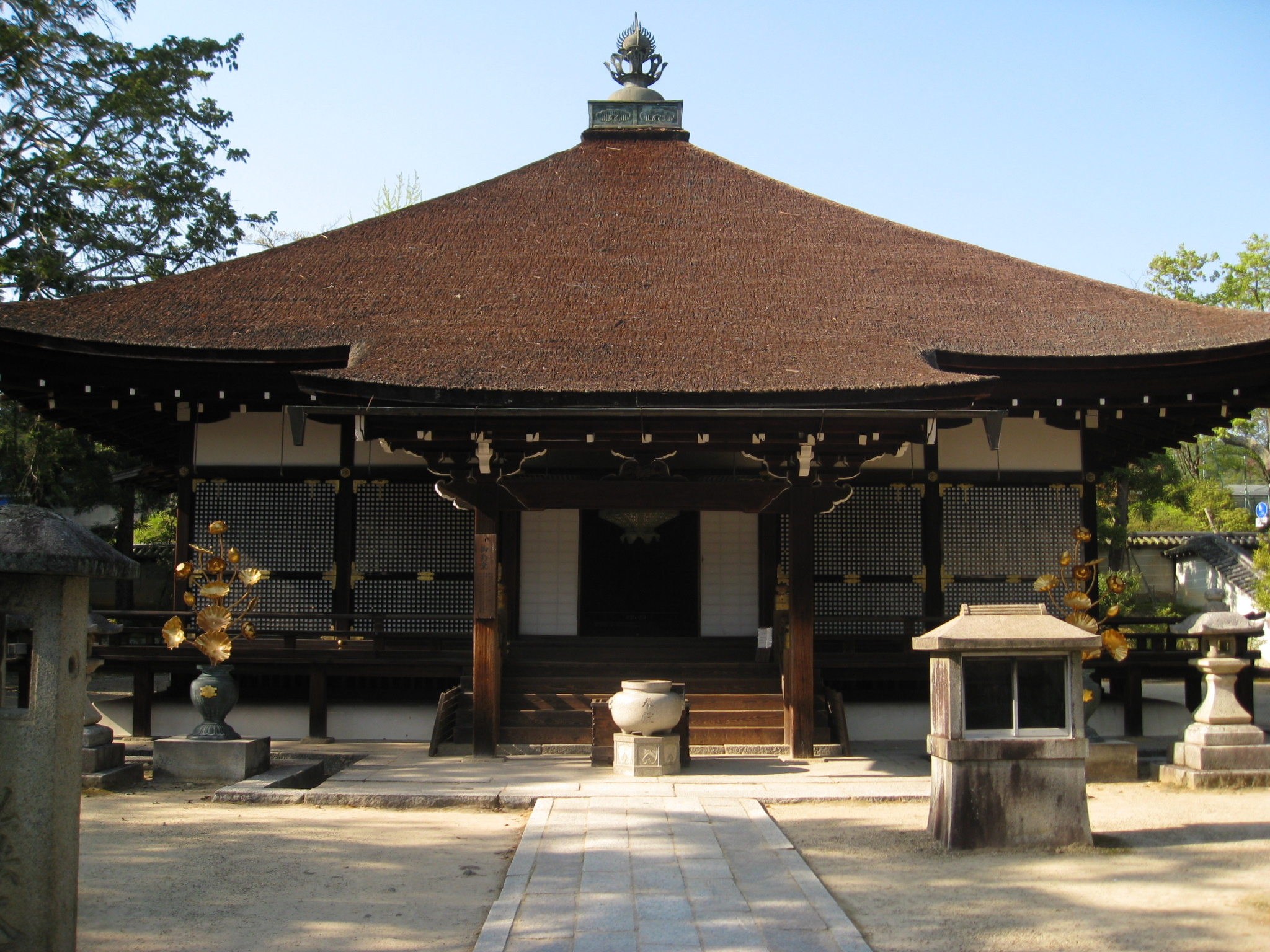
Miei-dō

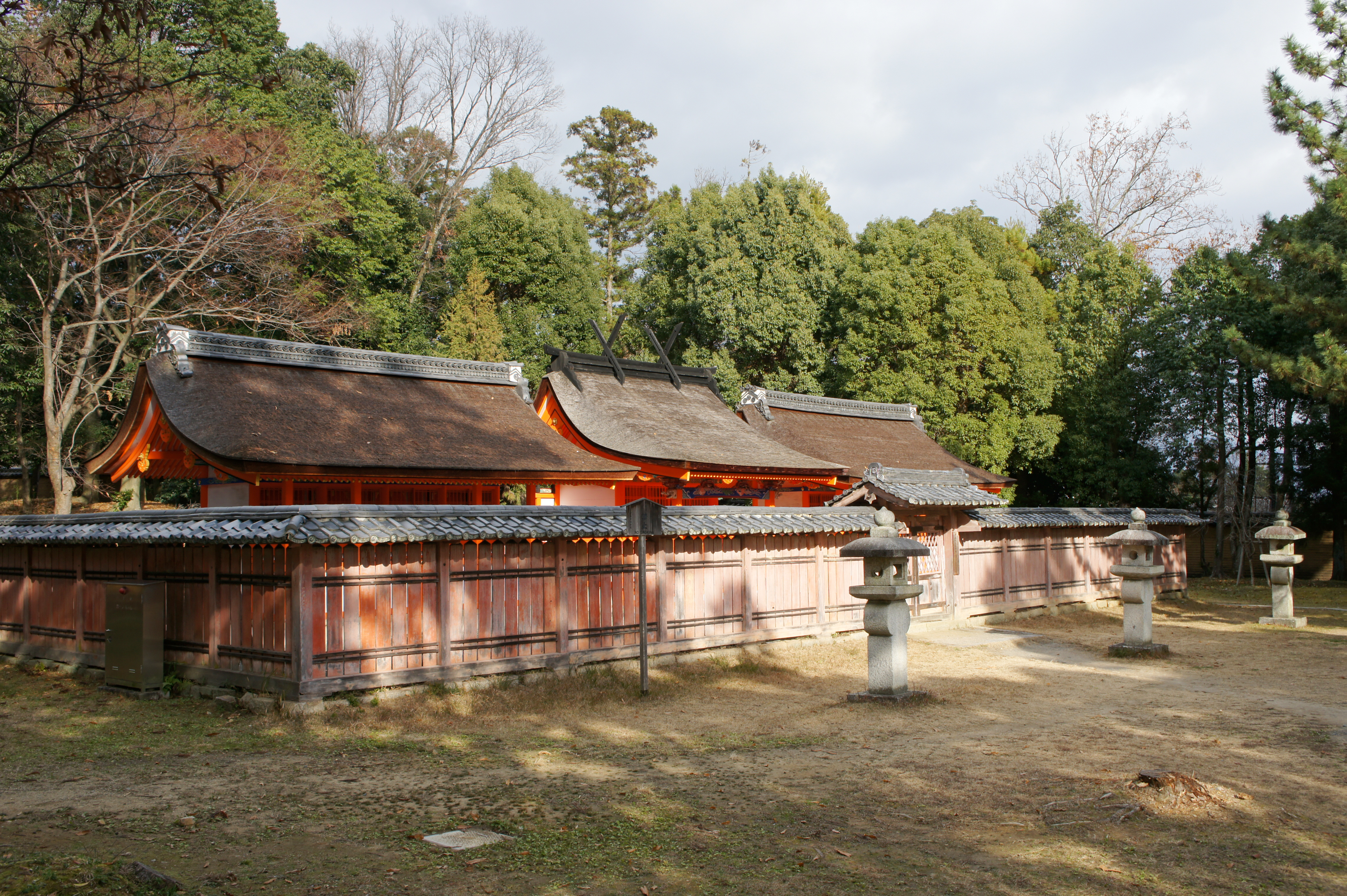
Kyūsho-myōjin

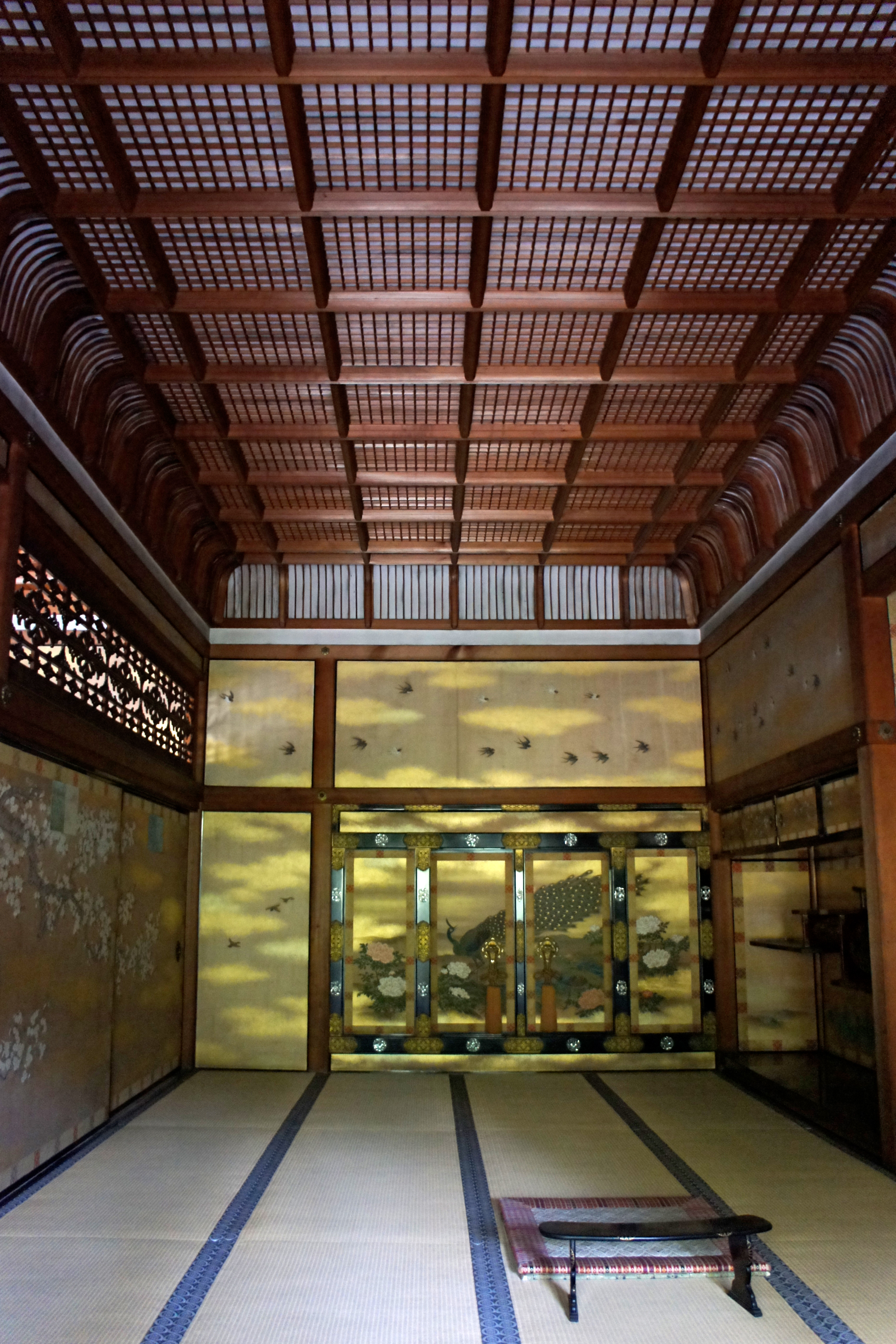
Interior of Shinden

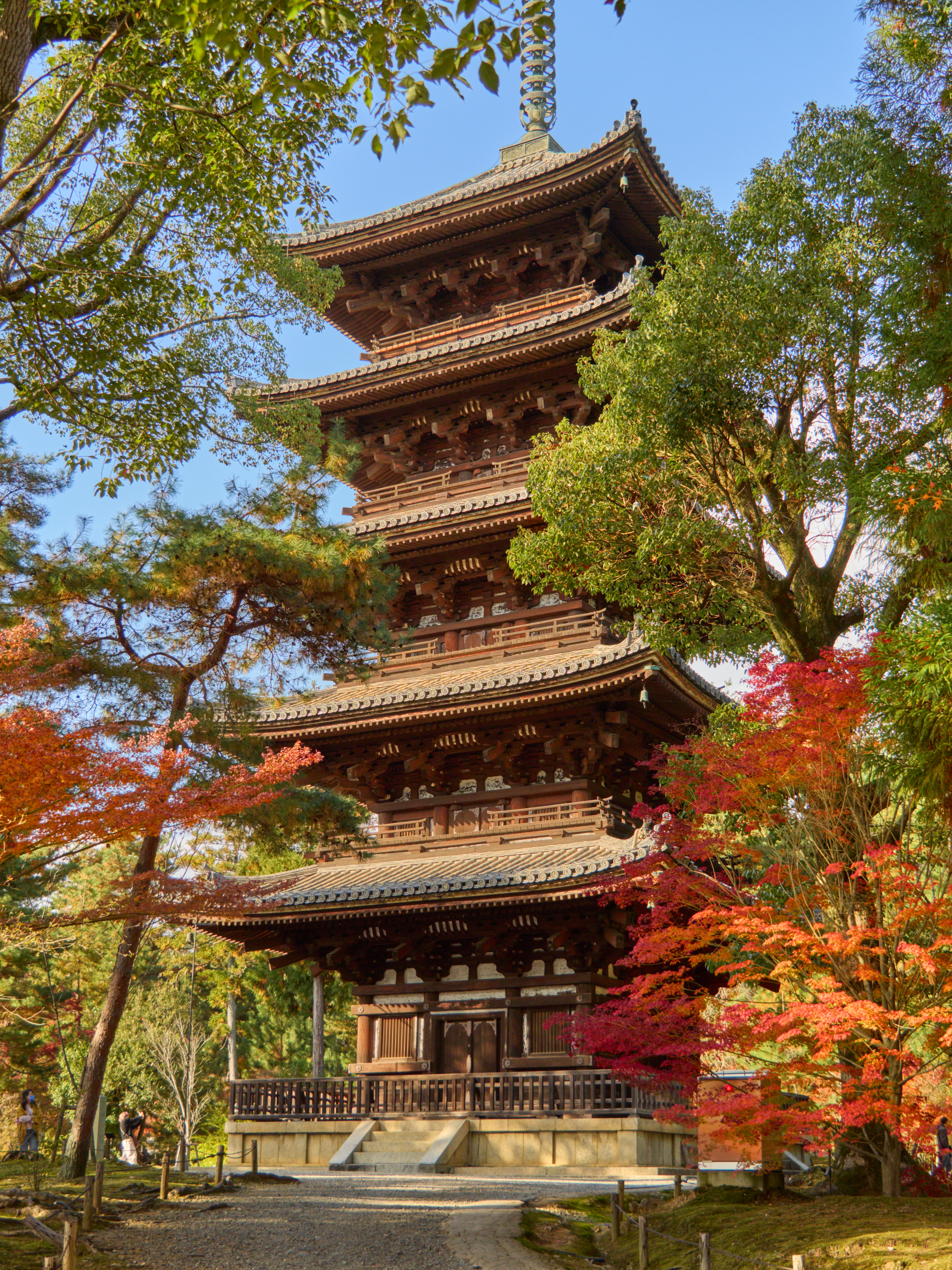
Pagoda surrounded by autumn foliage.

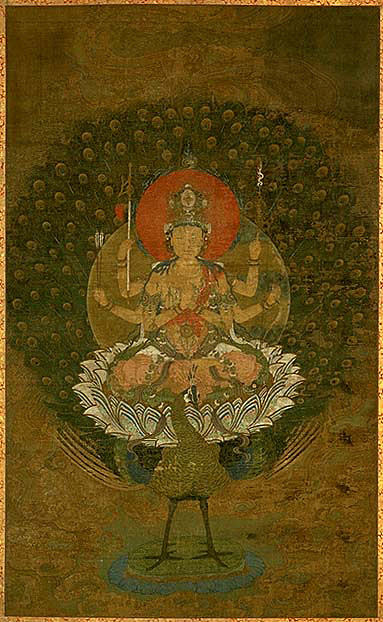
Mahamayuri

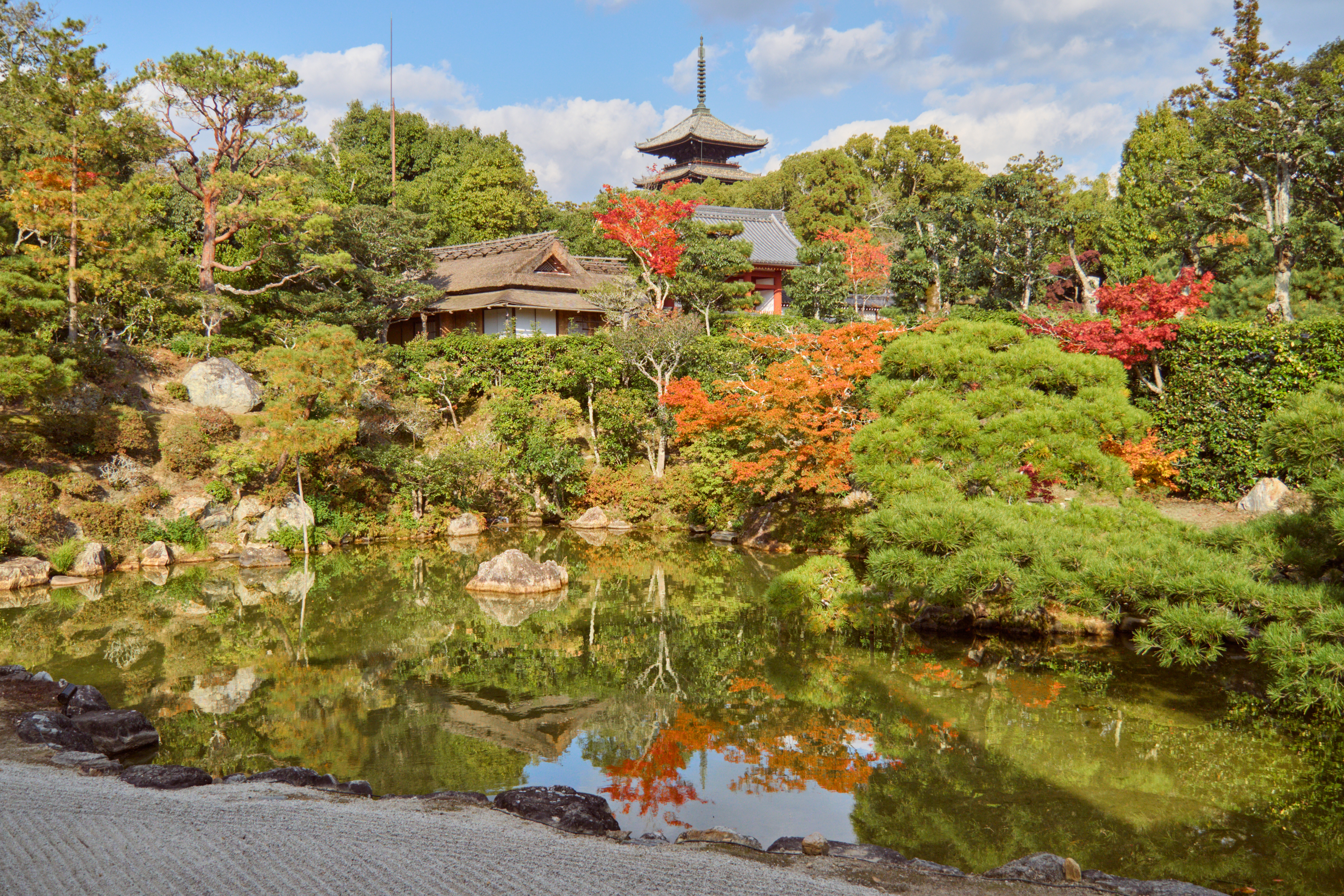
Gardens in autumn

== See also ==
- List of Buddhist temples in Kyoto
- List of National Treasures of Japan (temples)
- List of National Treasures of Japan (ancient documents)
- List of National Treasures of Japan (paintings)
- List of National Treasures of Japan (sculptures)
- List of National Treasures of Japan (crafts-others)
- List of National Treasures of Japan (writings)
- List of Historic Sites of Japan (Kyoto)
- List of Places of Scenic Beauty of Japan (Kyoto)
- Thirteen Buddhist Sites of Kyoto
