= Daikōmyō-ji =

Buddhist temple in Kyoto, Japan

Coordinates: 28.7624655°N 119.0669412°E

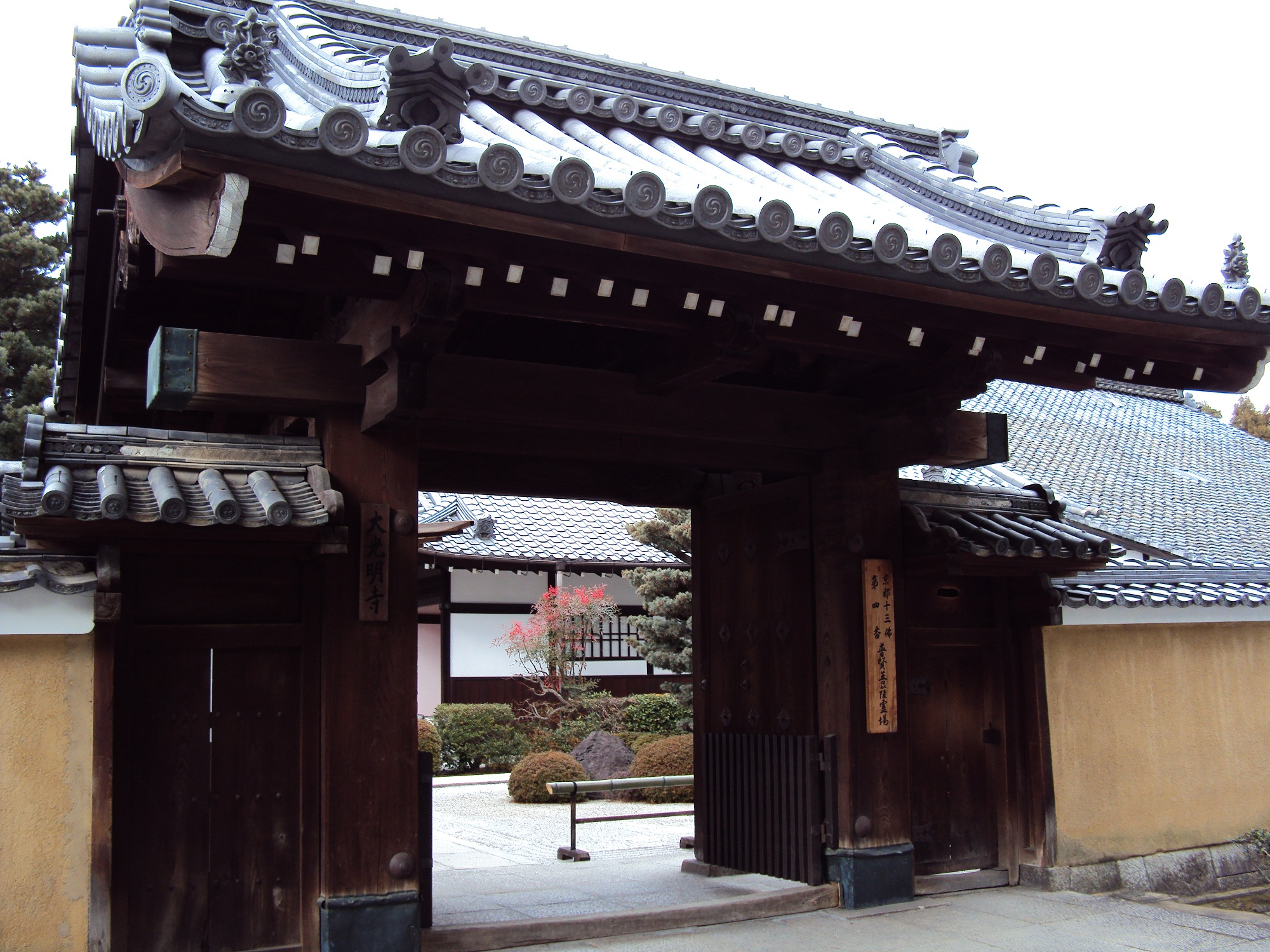
Worship hall

Daikōmyō-ji (大光明寺) is a Buddhist temple in Kamigyō-ku, Kyoto, Japan. It is affiliated with the Rinzai school of Buddhism. It was founded in 1339. It is a sub-temple located within the larger Jōtenkaku Museum.

The temple's main hall was built by Kōgimon'in (広義門院; 1292–1337), consort of Emperor Go-Fushimi. It was moved to Kyoto from Fushimi in 1615.

== See also ==
- Thirteen Buddhist Sites of Kyoto
