= Shingon-shū Chisan-ha =

Japanese sect of Shingon Buddhism

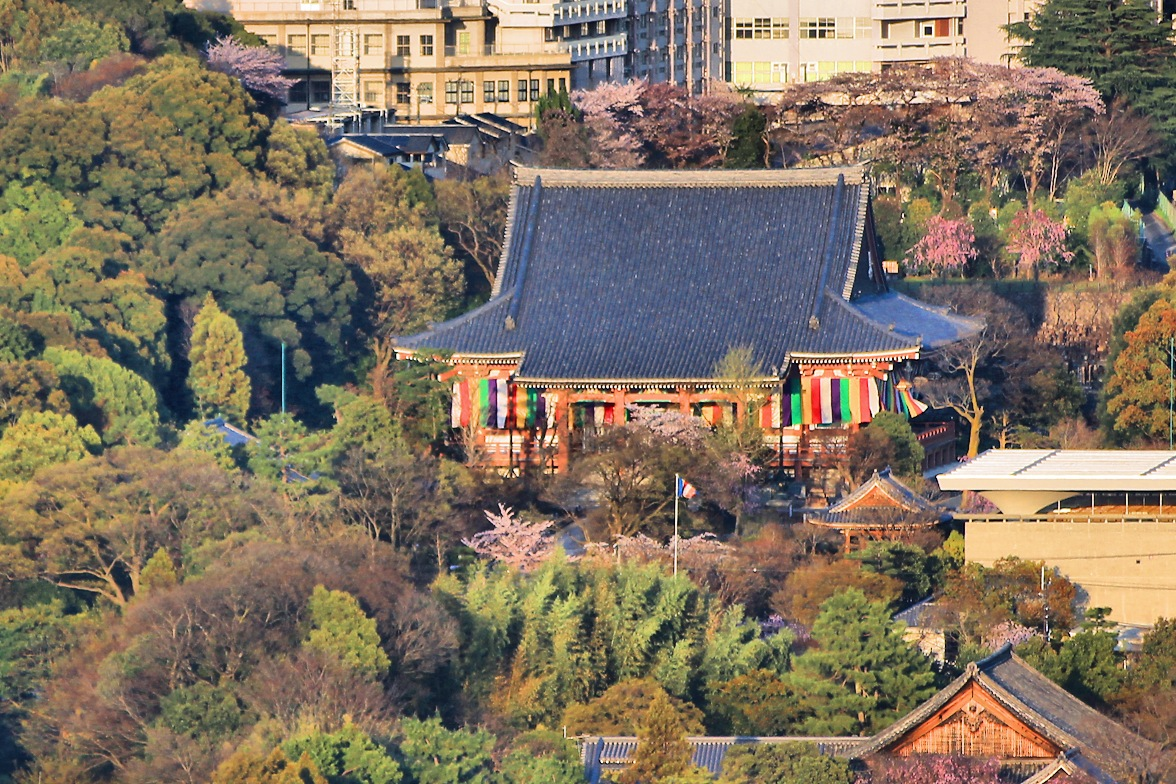
Chishaku-in temple

Chisan-ha (智山派) or Chisan is a Japanese sect of Shingon Buddhism. It is headquartered in Chishaku-in (temple) in Kyoto. Naritasan Shinshōji Temple in Narita is also an important temple and was founded in 940. Chisan-ha belongs to Tantric Buddhism.

== See also ==
- Buzan-ha
