= Tsunoda =

角田
- Romanisation: Tsunoda
- Pronunciation: つのだ; ^{IPA:} Japanese pronunciation: [tsɯnoda]; ^{X-SAMPA:} Japanese pronunciation: tsMnoda
- Language: Japanese

Other names
- Variant forms: Tsunota, つのた; Sumita, すみた; Sumida, すみだ; Kakuta, かくた; Kakuda, かくだ

Tsunoda (角田; lit. "antler [rice] field") is a Japanese surname.

Tsunoda

Japanese name
- Kanji: 角田
- Hiragana: つのだ
Transcriptions
- Revised Hepburn: Tsunoda

Notable people with the surname include:

== People ==
- Fusako Tsunoda (1914–2010), Japanese writer
- Joyce Sachiko Tsunoda (born 1938), Japanese-American college administrator
- Katsuji Tsunoda (角田 勝次; born 1943), Japanese basketball player
- Kazuo Tsunoda (1918–2013), Japanese fighter pilot
- Keisuke Tsunoda (角田 啓輔), Japanese table tennis player
- Narumi Tsunoda (born 1962), Japanese voice actor
- Ryūsaku Tsunoda (1877–1964), Japanese Japanologist
- Tomoshige Tsunoda, Japanese army office
- Tadanobu Tsunoda, Japanese author
- Yuki Tsunoda (角田 裕毅; born 2000), Japanese racing driver
- Tsunoda Tadayuki (1834–1918), Japanese kokugaku scholar and priest

== Characters ==
- Tsunoda, a fictional character from the manga The Strange Tale of Panorama Island
- Tsunoda, a fictional anthropomorphic gazelle character from the anime web series Aggretsuko
