= Morihiro =

- Gender: Male

Origin
- Origin: Japanese
- Meaning: Different meanings depending on the kanji used

Morihiro (written: 守容, 守弘, 護煕 or 盛厚) is a masculine Japanese given name. Notable people with the name include:

- Morihiro Hashimoto (橋本 守容; born 1977), Japanese darts player
- Morihiro Higashikuni (東久邇 盛厚; 1916–1969), Japanese prince
- Morihiro Hosokawa (細川 護煕; born 1938), Japanese politician
- Morihiro Saito (斉藤 守弘; 1928–2002), Japanese aikidoka
