= Fusako =

- Gender: Female

Origin
- Origin: Japanese
- Meaning: Different meanings depending on the kanji used

Fusako (written: 房子 or 夫佐子) is a feminine Japanese given name. Notable people with the name include:

- Fusako Ajiki (安食 総子; born 1974), Japanese professional shogi player
- Fusako Fujima (藤間 房子; 1882–1954), Japanese actress, dancer, and singer
- Fusako Kakumaru (角丸 房子; born 1958), Japanese diver
- Fusako Kitashirakawa (北白川 房子; 1890–1974), Japanese princess
- Fusako Kodama (児玉 房子; born 1945), Japanese photographer
- Fusako Kōno (香野 夫佐子; born 1916), Japanese diver
- Fusako Kuramochi (倉持 房子; born 1955), Japanese manga artist
- Fusako Kushi (久志 芙沙子; 1903–1986), Japanese female writer
- Fusako Masuda (増田 房子; born 1968), Japanese racewalker
- Fusako Sano (佐野 房子; born 1981), Japanese kidnapping victim
- Fusako Shigenobu (重信 房子; born 1945), Japanese communist
- Fusako Takatsukasa (鷹司 房子; 1653–1712), Japanese empress consort
- Fusako Tsunoda (角田房子; 1914–2010), Japanese writer
