= Nobuhiko Higashikuni =

Japanese aristocrat and Imperial prince (1945–2019)

- Born: Prince Nobuhiko Higashikuni; 10 March 1945; Tokyo, Japan
- Died: 20 March 2019 (aged 74)
- Spouse: Yoshiko Shimada (m. 1972)
- Issue: Masahiko Higashikuni
- Father: Prince Morihiro Higashikuni
- Mother: Shigeko, Princess Teru

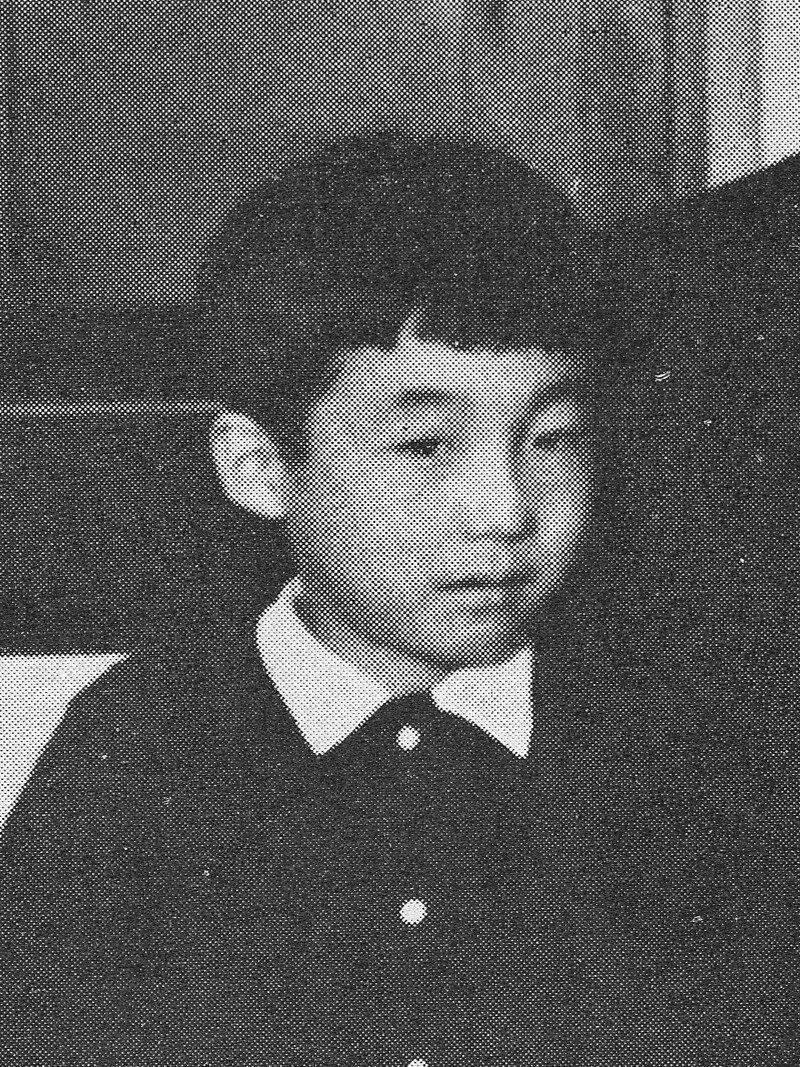
Higashikuni Nobuhiko as a child, image cropped from a larger family photo

Nobuhiko Higashikuni (東久邇 信彦, Higashikuni Nobuhiko; 10 March 1945 – 20 March 2019) was a Japanese aristocrat and former Imperial prince. The first grandchild of Emperor Hirohito, he was the eldest son of Shigeko, Princess Teru, the Emperor's eldest child. He was thus a maternal nephew of the Emperor Emeritus Akihito and cousin of Emperor Naruhito. His father was Morihiro Higashikuni, a grandson of Emperor Meiji.

== Biography ==
He was born in a shelter home amid the air raid on Tokyo as the eldest son of Prince Morihiro Higashikuni and Shigeko, Princess Teru, the eldest daughter of Hirohito, then the reigning Emperor of Japan.

After departing from the Imperial Palace, he studied at the Keio University Law School and worked at Mitsui Bank. He was appointed as a member of the Thai Association of Japan, and subsequently the executive director, managing director, Kakari member, etc. In June 2008, he assumed the honorary presidency of the All Japan Baseball Conference. In July 2009, he assumed the role of honorary adviser of the Japan-US Friendship Bridge Executive Committee. Other positions held by Higashikuni were; Honorary Chairman of the Society "Togo Association" and Honorary President of the Association to Protect Japanese Tradition.

Higashikuni married Yoshiko Shimada in June 1972. The Shimada family is a commoner family which runs a real estate management business (apartment/parking lot management) in Yokohama, but Emperor Hirohito liked Shimada's homely appearance and blessed Nobuhiko's marriage. In the following year a boy, Masahiko, was born to the couple.

== Ancestry ==
Since his parents and grandparents were all members of the Imperial House of Japan and Closely related to the senior members of the family, the existence of Nobuhiko and his son, Masahiko, has been noted when discussing the problem of succession to the throne due to the scarcity of male royalty, especially before 2006.

Ancestors of Nobuhiko Higashikuni

16. Prince Fushimi Kuniie
8. Prince Kuni Asahiko (=28)
17. Torikoji Nobuko
4. Prince Naruhiko Higashikuni
9. Utako Tarao
2. Prince Morihiro Higashikuni
20. Osahito (Emperor Kōmei)
10. Mutsuhito (Emperor Meiji) (=24)
21. Nakayama Yoshiko
5. Toshiko, Princess Yasu
22. Konoshiro Sono
11. Lady Sachiko Sono
1. Prince Nobuhiko Higashikuni
24. Mutsuhito (Emperor Meiji) (=10)
12. Yoshihito (Emperor Taishō)
25. Yanagihara Naruko
6. Hirohito (Emperor Shōwa)
26. Kujō Michitaka
13. Sadako Kujō (Empress Teimei)
27. Yonama Noriko
3. Shigeko, Princess Teru
28. Prince Kuni Asahiko (=8)
14. Prince Kuni Kuniyoshi
29. Izumi Makiko
7. Nagako (Empress Kōjun)
30. Shimazu Tadayoshi
15. Chikako Shimazu
31. Sumako Yamazaki

Nobuhiko Higashikuni House of Yamato Born: 10 March 1945
Titles of nobility
Preceded by Morihiro Higashikuni	— TITULAR — Heir apparent to the Headship of the House of Higashikuni (Hereditary Prince Higashikuni); 1 February 1969 – 20 January 1990	Succeeded by Masahiko Higashikuni
Preceded by Prince Naruhiko Higashikuni	— TITULAR — Head of the House of Higashikuni; 20 January 1990 – 20 March 2019	Succeeded by Masahiko Higashikuni
