= Sōkichi Takagi =

Imperial Japanese Navy rear admiral (1893–1979)

- 高木 惣吉
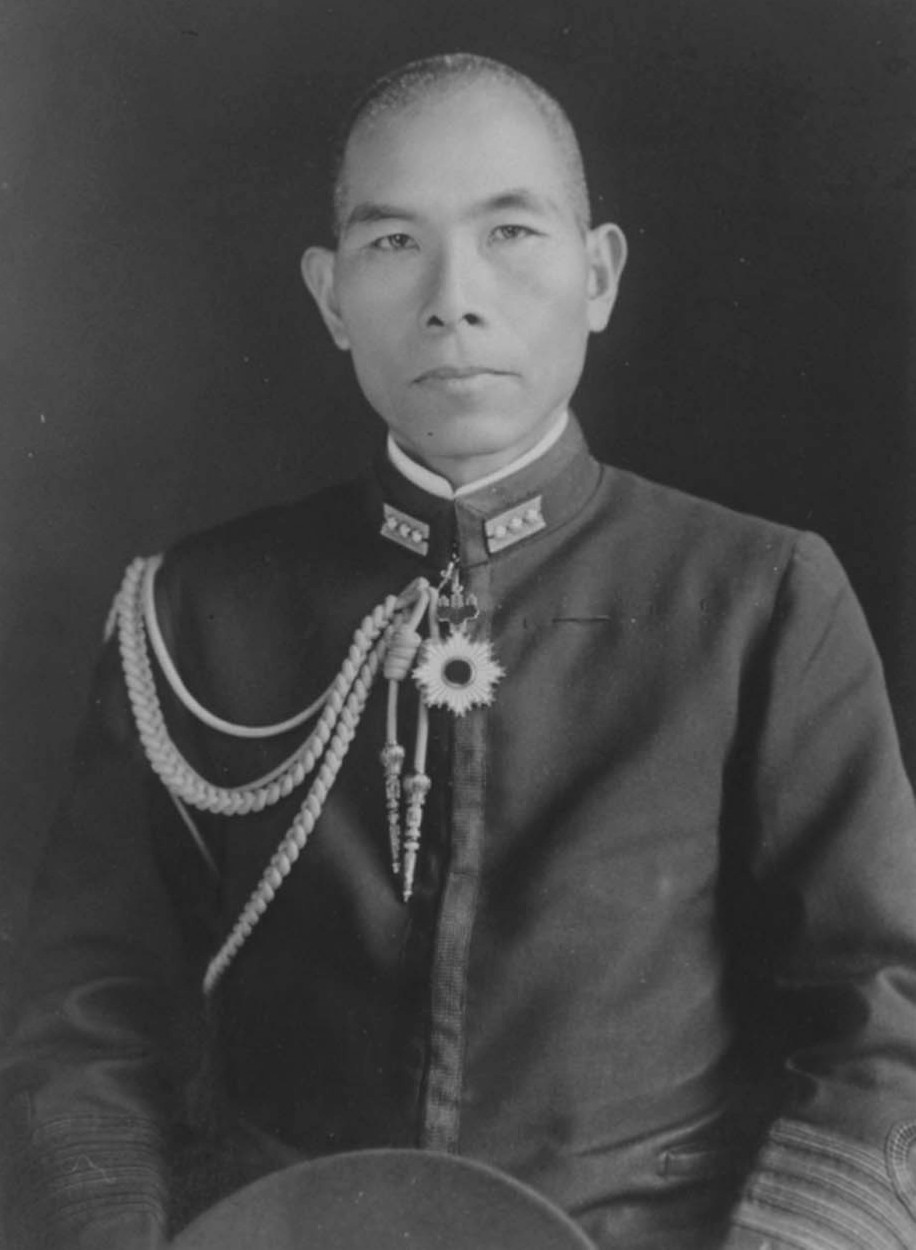
- Takagi c. 1944
- Born: August 9, 1893; Hitoyoshi, Kumamoto, Japan
- Died: July 27, 1979 (aged 85); Chigasaki, Kanagawa, Japan
- Education: Imperial Japanese Navy Academy; Navigation School; Naval War College
- Military career
- Allegiance: Empire of Japan
- Branch: Imperial Japanese Navy
- Service years: 1915–1945
- Rank: Rear admiral
- Units: Iwate, Aki, Chitose, Akashi, Hokaze, Komahashi, Manshū, Maizuru Naval District
- Conflicts: World War II
- Other work: Naval attaché, secretary, Deputy Chief Cabinet Secretary

Sōkichi Takagi (高木 惣吉, Takagi Sōkichi; August 9, 1893 – July 27, 1979) was a rear admiral in the Imperial Japanese Navy during World War II.

An opponent to the Tōjō government, Takagi's efforts to undermine the Japanese wartime government have been compared with the efforts of German admiral Wilhelm Canaris to undermine the Nazi government, contributing to the end of the war.

== Biography ==
Takagi was born in what is now part of Hitoyoshi, Kumamoto Prefecture in Kyūshū. He graduated from the 43rd class of the Imperial Japanese Navy Academy in 1915, ranking 27th out of 96 cadets. He served his midshipman duty aboard the cruiser Iwate and the battleship Aki, and was assigned to Chitose and Akashi after he was commissioned an ensign.

Takagi attended Navigation School and was promoted to lieutenant in 1921, after which he served as chief navigator on the destroyer Hokaze, submarine tender Komahashi and patrol vessel Manshū.

Takagi graduated from Naval War College in 1927, upon which he was promoted to lieutenant commander and posted as naval attaché to France until 1930. After his return, he served as private secretary to the Navy Minister for two years before being appointed commander and instructor of the Naval War College from 1933 to 1936.

In 1937, Takagi was promoted to captain becoming Chief of the Navy Ministry's Research Section. While head of the government organization, Takagi often over-stretched the predefined powers of his office, acting as a political contact for the Navy through government officials and statesmen such as Fumimaro Konoe, Kōichi Kido, and Saionji Kinmochi as well as developing contacts with intellectuals within the government.

An opponent of Japan's decision to declare war on the United States, Takagi was removed from his position as Chief of the Research Section in 1942 and was reassigned as chief of staff of the Maizuru Naval District. Promoted to rear admiral on 1 May 1943, Takagi (due to his access and unique knowledge of classified files from his time as chief of the Research Section) was asked in September by Navy Minister Shigetarō Shimada to compile a report analyzing Japanese defeats during the Pacific campaign of 1942. Going far beyond its original purpose, Takagi's analysis of combat evidence, conditions in the Japanese home islands, and air and shipping losses as of that year convinced him that Japan's defeat was inevitable. Believing the only solution for Japan was the elimination of the Tojo-led government and negotiation of a truce with the United States, Takagi was hesitant to present the report to Shimada, instead beginning planning for the assassination of Prime Minister Hideki Tōjō before his removal from office in July 1944.

As a member of the Navy Staff College's Research Department, Takagi was encouraged by the newly appointed Navy Minister Mitsumasa Yonai to compose an ultrasecret document proposing the most favorable scenario for Japan's eventual withdrawal from the Pacific, a project he continued working on in cooperation with other government officials until the surrender of Japan in August 1945.

In September 1945, Takagi was appointed to the new position of Deputy Chief Cabinet Secretary under Taketora Ogata in the Higashikuni Cabinet. In that position he worked with Teiji Yabe, a professor of Tokyo Imperial University, on revising the Meiji Constitution in October 1945.

Takagi died in 1979 at his home in Chigasaki, Kanagawa, and his grave is at the temple of Tokei-ji in Kamakura.

== See also ==
- Tsunoda Tomoshige

== Bibliography ==
Rengō kantai shimatsuki [A factual description of the Combined Fleet] by Rear Admiral Sōkichi Takagi (Tokyo: Bungei Shunjūsha, 1949), ASIN: B000Jbjed4 [元海軍少将高木惣吉著, 聯合艦隊始末記 (東京: 文藝春秋社, 1949)]
