= Tomoshige Tsunoda =

Imperial Japanese Army major

- 津野田 知重
- Born: Nagano, Japan
- Family: Kosaka Takeo (uncle)
- Military career
- Allegiance: Empire of Japan
- Branch: Imperial Japanese Army
- Rank: Major
- Conflicts: Second Sino-Japanese War; World War II

Tomoshige Tsunoda (津野田 知重, Tsunoda Tomoshige) was a major in the Imperial Japanese Army during World War II who was known for his role in the failed plot to assassinate prime minister Hideki Tojo.

== Biography ==
He came from a family of Nagano Prefecture. His uncle was Kosaka Takeo, a Diet member. He served in the Second Sino-Japanese War under Takahito, Prince Mikasa. As the war progressed, Tsunoda sought for the resignation of prime minister Hideki Tojo. He plotted to assassinate Tojo, but the prime minister resigned before the plot could be executed. Tsunoda was arrested for his role in the plot. He admitted that he planned to kill Tojo, and establish a new cabinet under Prince Naruhiko Higashikuni.

== See also ==
- Japanese dissidence during the Shōwa period
- Sōkichi Takagi
