= Higashikuni-kyo =

Japanese religious organization

Higashikuni-kyo (ひがしくに教 / 東久邇教, Higashikuni-kyō) was a Japanese religious organization formed by former Premier Prince Higashikuni in April 1950, with the help of his advisor and Sōtō-sect priest Ryukai Obara.

The core of Higashikuni-Kyo was a mastery of Buddhism and a shared message of world peace through benevolence, service, devotion, and eternal peace in human society. Religious practices would include pilgrimages consoling the spirits of the dead from World War II and offering respectful and mourning prayers at tombs of unknown soldiers in various countries around the world. A devout member would also call upon society to utilize atomic power for the benefit of mankind and development of culture rather than as a weapon of mass destruction.

== History ==
The creation and planning of the Higashikuni-Kyo was organized by Ryukai Obara, a Soto-sect priest and advisor to Higashikuni. Obara intended to appeal to those accustomed to Emperor Worship by utilizing the name of former Prince Higashikuni. On June 1, 1950, the Higashikuni-Kyo religious organization was registered in accordance with Article 2 of the Religious Corporations Ordinance and listed Ryukai Obara as its superintendent. The Special Investigation Bureau advised the organization that Higashikuni should retire from his position of founder and the organization should be renamed immediately. The Organizations Control Ordinance did not allow former General Higashikuni to assume a leading position within the organization. For this reason, the organization asked for Higashikuni's retirement from office and decided not to use his name on documents related to the organization. The faith was also renamed Hoo-kyo and appointed Obara to the position of founder. These major changes which allowed this new religion to escape the conflicts with the Organisations Control Ordinance led to its ultimate demise.

It was banned by the occupation authorities out of fear for communist influence.

== See also ==
- Prince Higashikuni
