= Higashikuni-no-miya =

Branch of the Japanese imperial family

Higashikuni
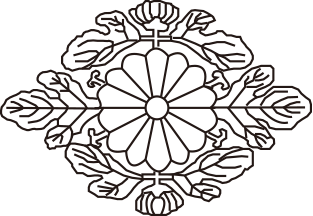
- Pronunciation: Higashikuni

Origin
- Origin: Japanese
- Region of origin: Japanese

The Higashikuni-no-miya (東久邇宮) was the ninth-oldest branch of the Japanese Imperial Family, created from branches of the Fushimi-no-miya house.

== Higashikuni-no-miya ==
The Higashikuni-no-miya house was formed by Prince Naruhiko, ninth son of Prince Kuni Asahiko, in November 1906.

	Name	Born	Succeeded	Retired	Died
1	Prince Higashikuni Naruhiko (東久邇宮稔彦王, Higashikuni-no-miya Naruhiko-ō)	1887	1906	N/A	1990
X	Prince Higashikuni Morihiro (東久邇宮盛厚王, Higashikuni-no-miya Morihiro-ō)	1916	N/A	N/A	1969
2	Prince Higashikuni Nobuhiko (東久邇宮信彦王, Higashikuni-no-miya Nobukiko-ō)	1945	1990	N/A	2019
3	Masahiko Higashikuni (東久邇征彦, Higashikuni-no-miya Masahiko-ō)	1973	2019	N/A	N/A

Prince Higashikuni Nobuhiko became simply Higashikuni Nobuhiko after the abolition of the Japanese aristocracy during the American occupation of Japan in 1947.
