= Shigeko Higashikuni =

Former Japanese princess (1925–1961)

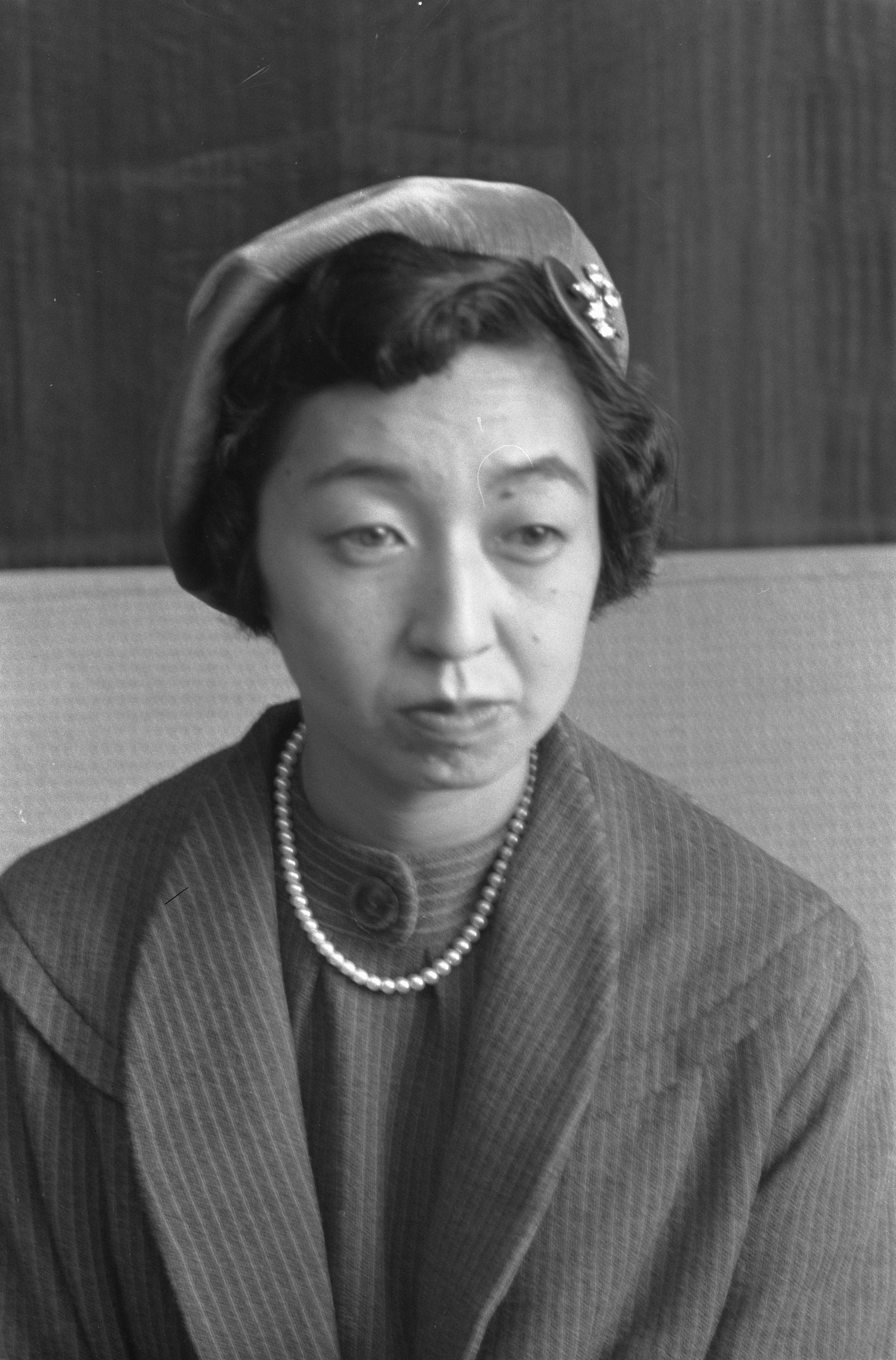
- Higashikuni in 1959
- Born: Shigeko, Princess Teru (照宮成子内親王); 6 December 1925; Akasaka Palace, Tokyo City, Empire of Japan
- Died: 23 July 1961 (aged 35); Imperial Household Agency Hospital, Tokyo, Japan
- Resting place: Toshimagaoka Imperial Cemetery, Bunkyō
- Spouse: Morihiro Higashikuni (m. 1943)
- Children: Nobuhiko Higashikuni; Fumiko Higashikuni; Naohiko Higashikuni; Hidehiko Higashikuni; Yūko Higashikuni
- Parents: Emperor Shōwa (father); Princess Nagako Kuni (mother)
- Relatives: Imperial House of Japan

Shigeko Higashikuni (東久邇 成子, Higashikuni Shigeko; 6 December 1925 – 23 July 1961), born Shigeko, Princess Teru (照宮成子内親王, Teru-no-miya Shigeko Naishinnō), was the wife of Prince Morihiro Higashikuni (grandson of Emperor Meiji) and eldest daughter of Emperor Shōwa and Empress Kōjun. She was the eldest sister to Emperor Emeritus Akihito, and paternal aunt to Emperor Naruhito.

== Biography ==
Princess Shigeko was born at Akasaka Palace in Tokyo on 6 December 1925, the first child of Crown Prince Hirohito (later Emperor Shōwa), and his wife, Crown Princess Nagako (later Empress Kōjun) while her father was still Prince Regent for her grandfather, the Emperor Taishō. Her childhood appellation was Teru-no-miya (照宮) ("Princess Teru"). As was the practice of the time, she was not raised by her biological parents after the age of three, but by a succession of court ladies at a separate palace built for her and her younger sisters in the Marunouchi district of Tokyo from 1930. Emperor Shōwa opposed the move, but could not defy court tradition. She entered the girls elementary department of the Gakushūin Peer's School in 1932 and completed the secondary department in 1942, learning cooking and literature.

On 9 May 1939, Princess Shigeko rode on the Chōshi Electric Railway Line in Chiba Prefecture from Chōshi to Tōdaimae and back as part of a Gakushūin school outing.

In 1941, she was formally engaged to Prince Morihiro Higashikuni, the eldest son of Prince Naruhiko Higashikuni (later served as Prime Minister in 1945) and Toshiko, Princess Yasu (ninth daughter of Emperor Meiji) . The bride and groom were double first cousins once removed, through both the main imperial line, in descent from Emperor Meiji (the bride's maternal grandfather and the groom's father were siblings; meaning that the groom was a first cousin of the bride's father), and through collateral imperial lines, or ōke, that were cadet branches of the Fushimi-no-miya cadet branch of the imperial house. The couple were officially wed on 10 October 1943. As the wedding occurred in the middle of World War II, ceremonies and expenses were kept to a minimum, and she wore a junihitoe kimono belonging to her mother, Empress Kōjun, rather than having special clothing created for the occasion.

In 1947, the Higashikunis were reduced to commoner status with the abolition of titles of nobility by the Allied occupation forces. With rampant post-war inflation, high taxation, and various failed business ventures by her husband, the Higashikuni family was reduced to poverty. In January 1958, she accepted an offer by the Japanese national television network, NHK, to appear before a live audience and explain the New Year's poetry card reading contest and other royal ceremonies. She fell ill in 1960, complaining of stomach pains, and was diagnosed with stomach cancer. Hospitalized at the Imperial Household Agency Hospital in Tokyo, she died on 23 July 1961. Her grave is at the Toshimagaoka imperial cemetery in Bunkyo, Tokyo.

== Family ==
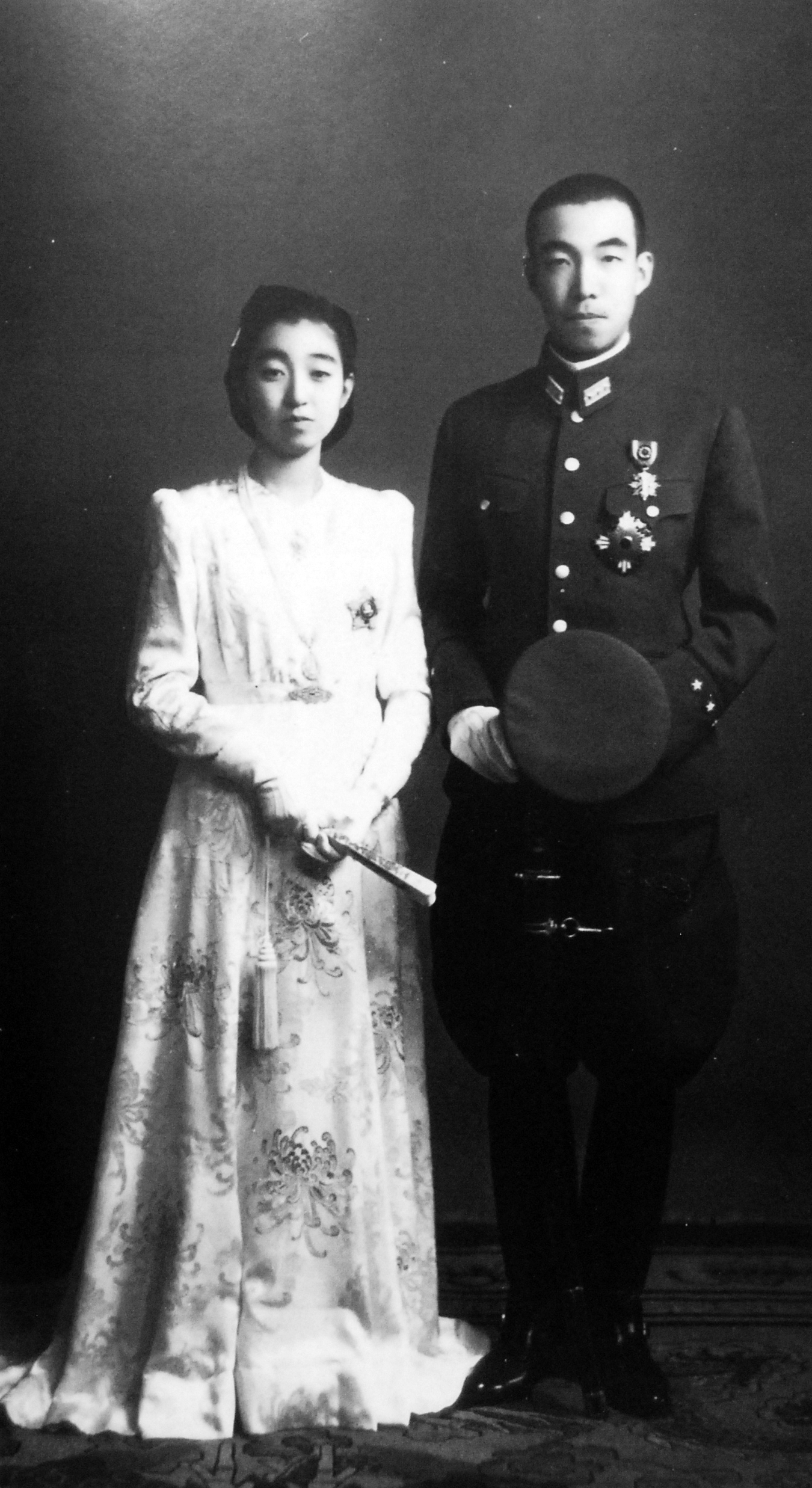
The Higashikuni couple on their wedding day, 1943

Shigeko and Morihiro had five children, the last three of whom were born after they were reduced in status to commoners:

- 1. Son: Prince Nobuhiko Higashikuni (東久邇宮 信彦王, Higashikuni-no-miya Nobuhiko ō) (10 March 1945 – 20 March 2019); married Shimada Yoshiko in 1972, and had one son, Higashikuni Masahiko (b. 1973).
- 2. Daughter: Princess Fumiko Higashikuni (文子女王, Fumiko joō; born 23 December 1946); married Kazutoshi later to Daikichi Takagi.
- 3. Son: Hidehiko Higashikuni (東久邇 秀彦; born 30 June 1949): adopted by the Mibu family as "Mibu Motohiro".
- 4. Son: Naohiko Higashikuni (東久邇 真彦; born 1953); married Sato Kazuko, with two sons, Teruhiko and Mutsuhiko.
- 5. Daughter: Yūko Higashikuni (東久邇 優子; born 1954) married Naooki Azuma.

== Honours ==
=== National honours ===
- Grand Cordon of the Order of the Precious Crown

== Ancestry ==
Ancestors of Shigeko Higashikuni

8. Mutsuhito, Emperor Meiji
4. Yoshihito, Emperor Taishō
9. Lady Naruko Yanagiwara
2. Hirohito, Emperor Shōwa
10. Prince Kujō Michitaka of the Fujiwara Clan
5. Lady Sadako Kujō
11. Lady Ikuko Noma
1. Shigeko, Princess Teru
12. Asahiko, 1st Imperial Prince Kuni
6. Kuniyoshi, 2nd Imperial Prince Kuni
13. Lady Makiko Izumi
3. Princess Nagako of Kuni
14. Prince Shimazu Tadayoshi
7. Princess Chikako Shimazu
15. Lady Sumako Yamazaki

== Portrayals in the media ==
Princess Shigeko was a featured protagonist in the 2022 alternative history novel Hydrogen Wars: Atomic Sunrise by R.M. Christianson and its upcoming sequel Hydrogen Wars: Atomic Winter.

== Gallery ==
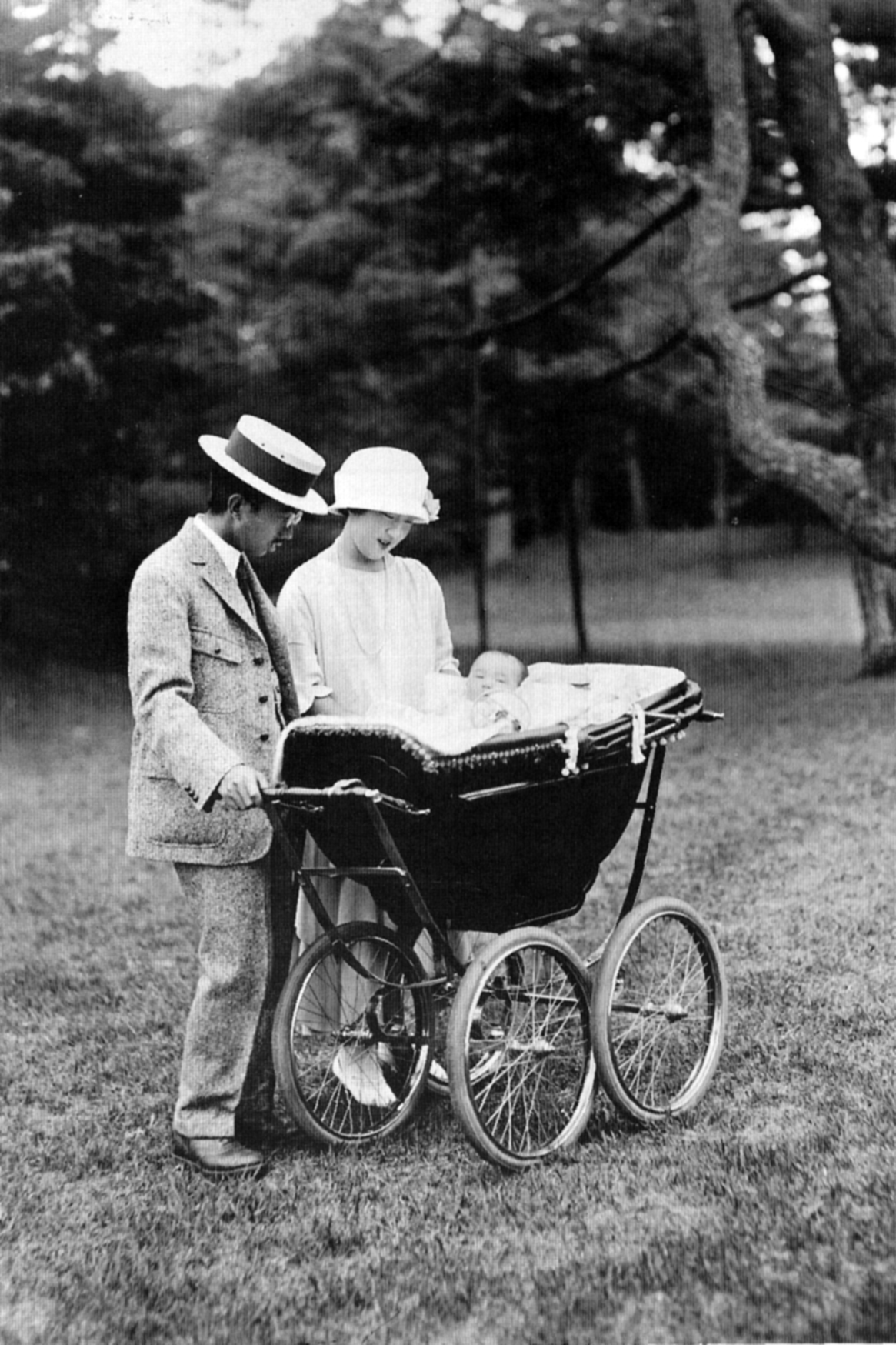
Crown Prince Hirohito and Crown Princess Nagako with their first child, Princess Shigeko in 1926

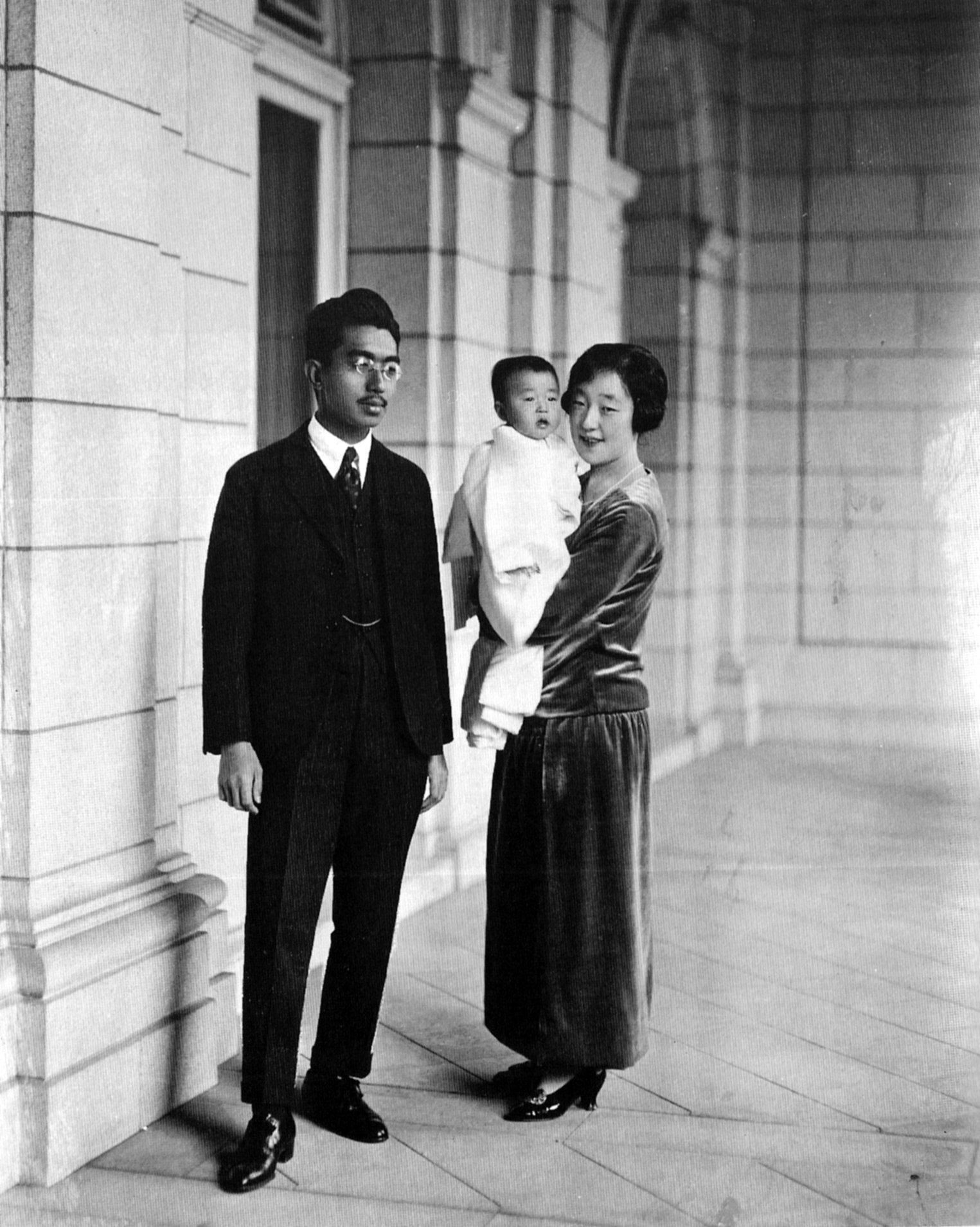
Princess Shigeko with her parents in 1926

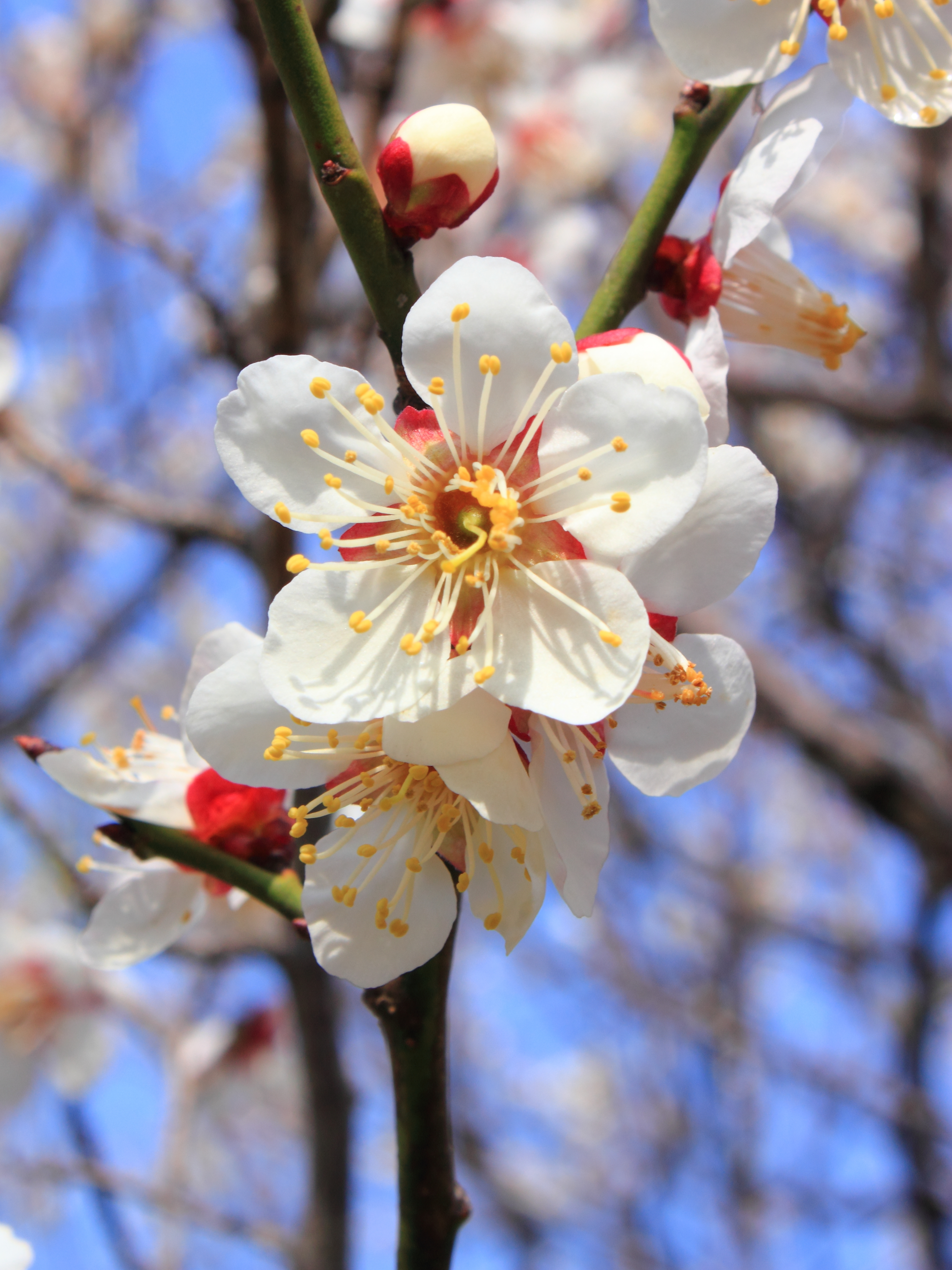
Japanese plum blossom, Prunus mume, designated imperial personal emblem of Shigeko

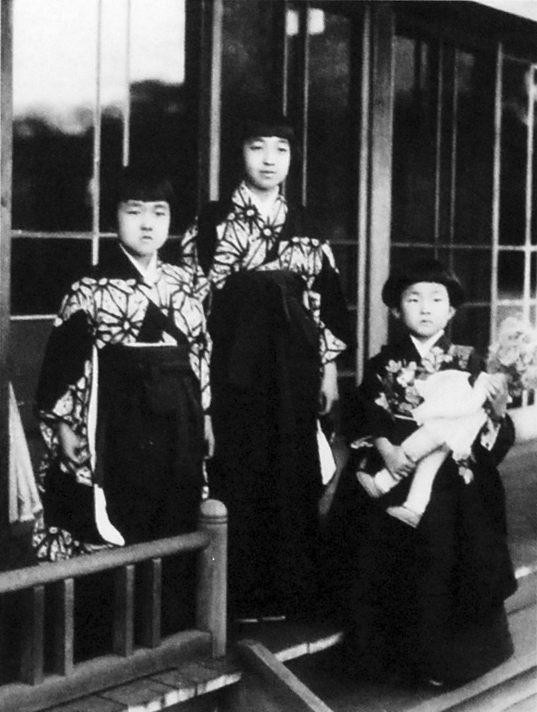
Princess Shigeko and her sisters in 1937

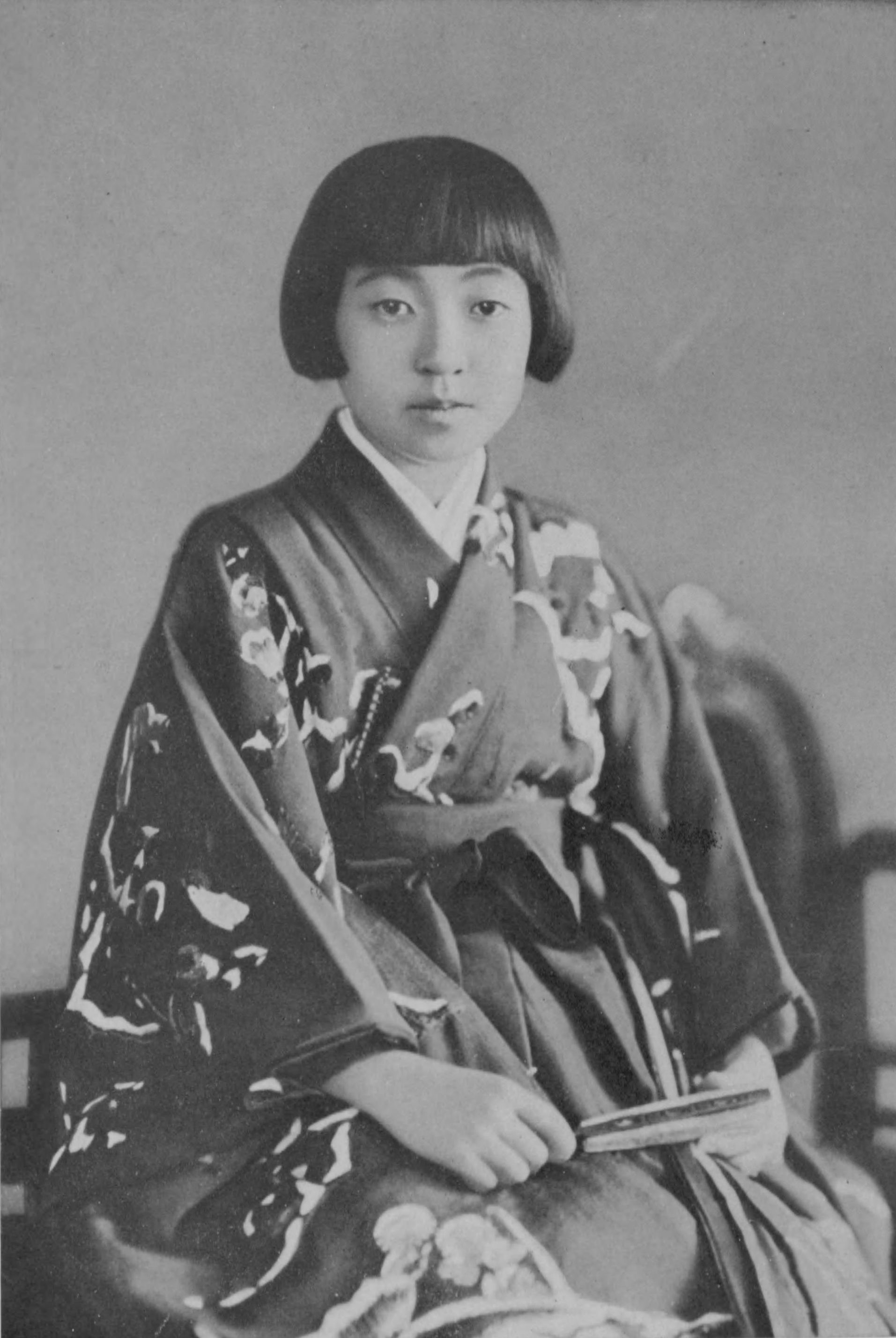
Princess Shigeko in 1937

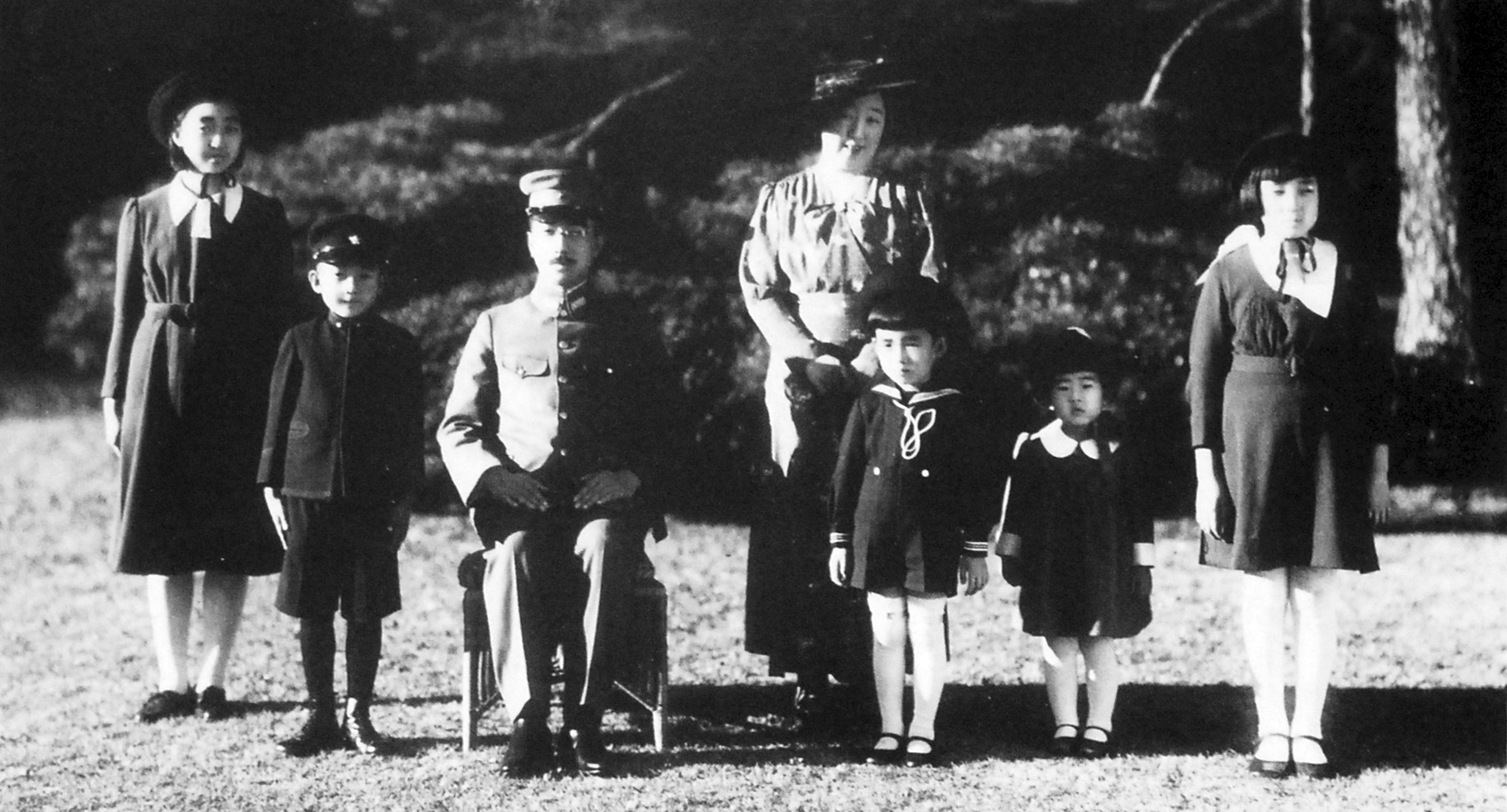
Princess Shigeko and her parents and siblings, 7 December 1941

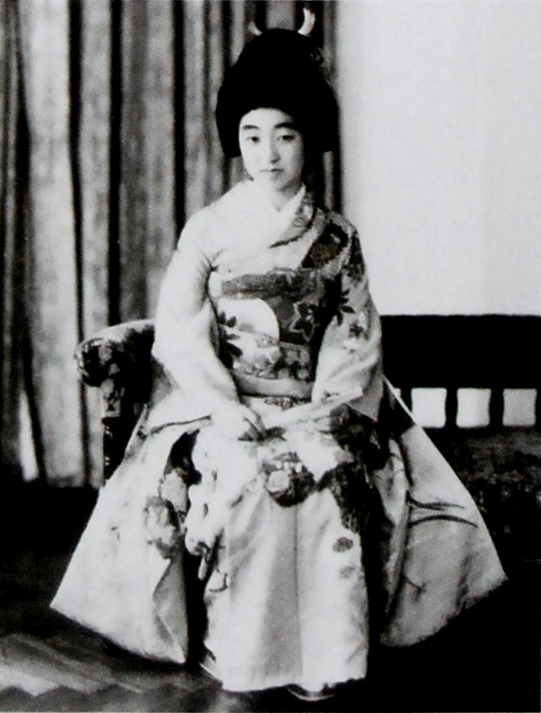
Princess Shigeko in 1941

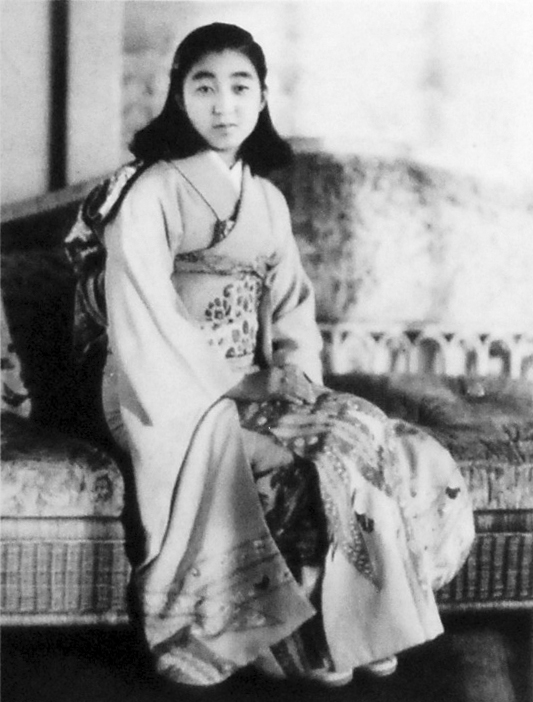
Princess Shigeko in 1941

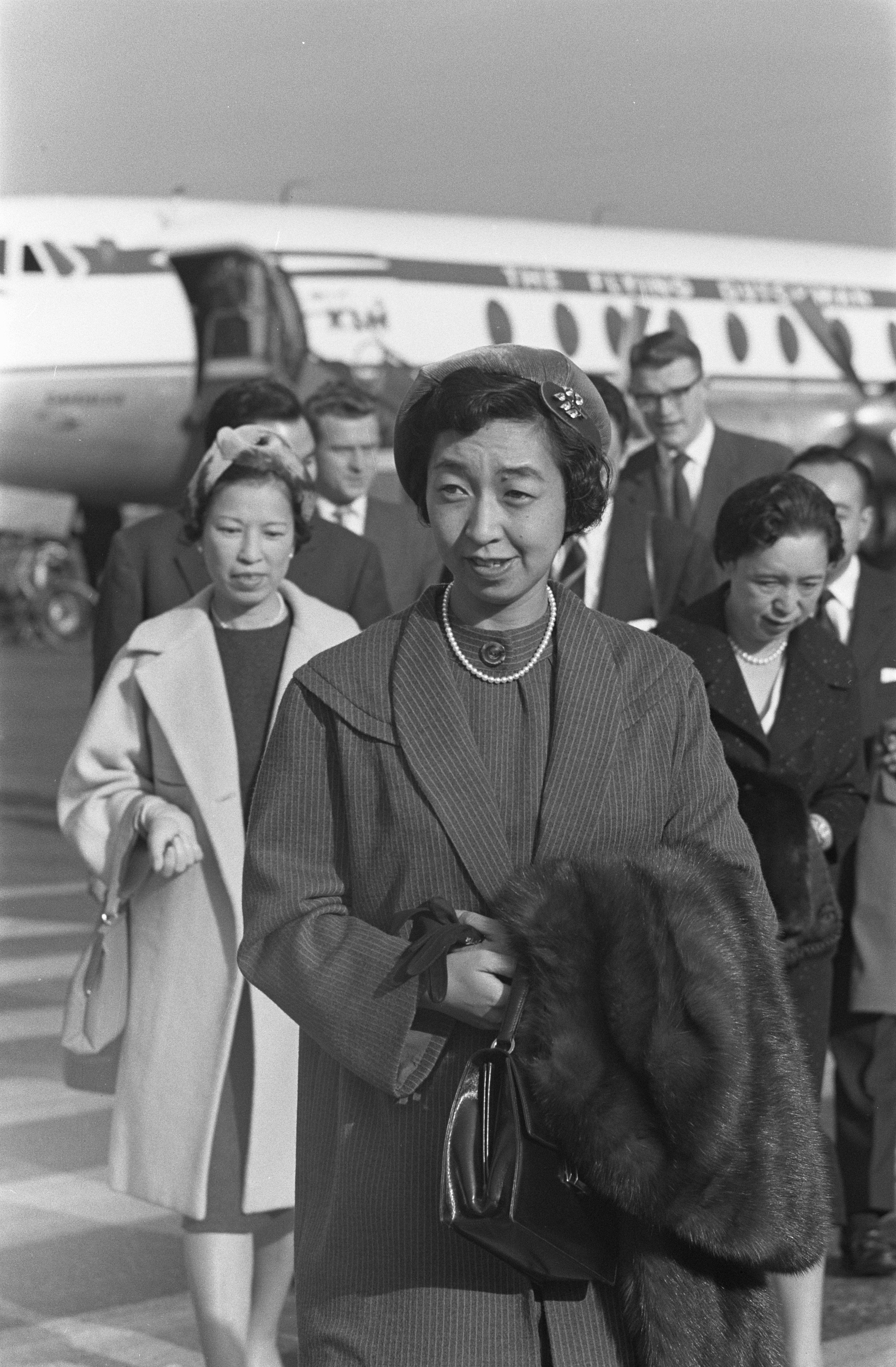
Shigeko at Amsterdam Airport Schiphol, on 14 October 1959
