= Toshiko Higashikuni =

Former Japanese princess (1896–1978)

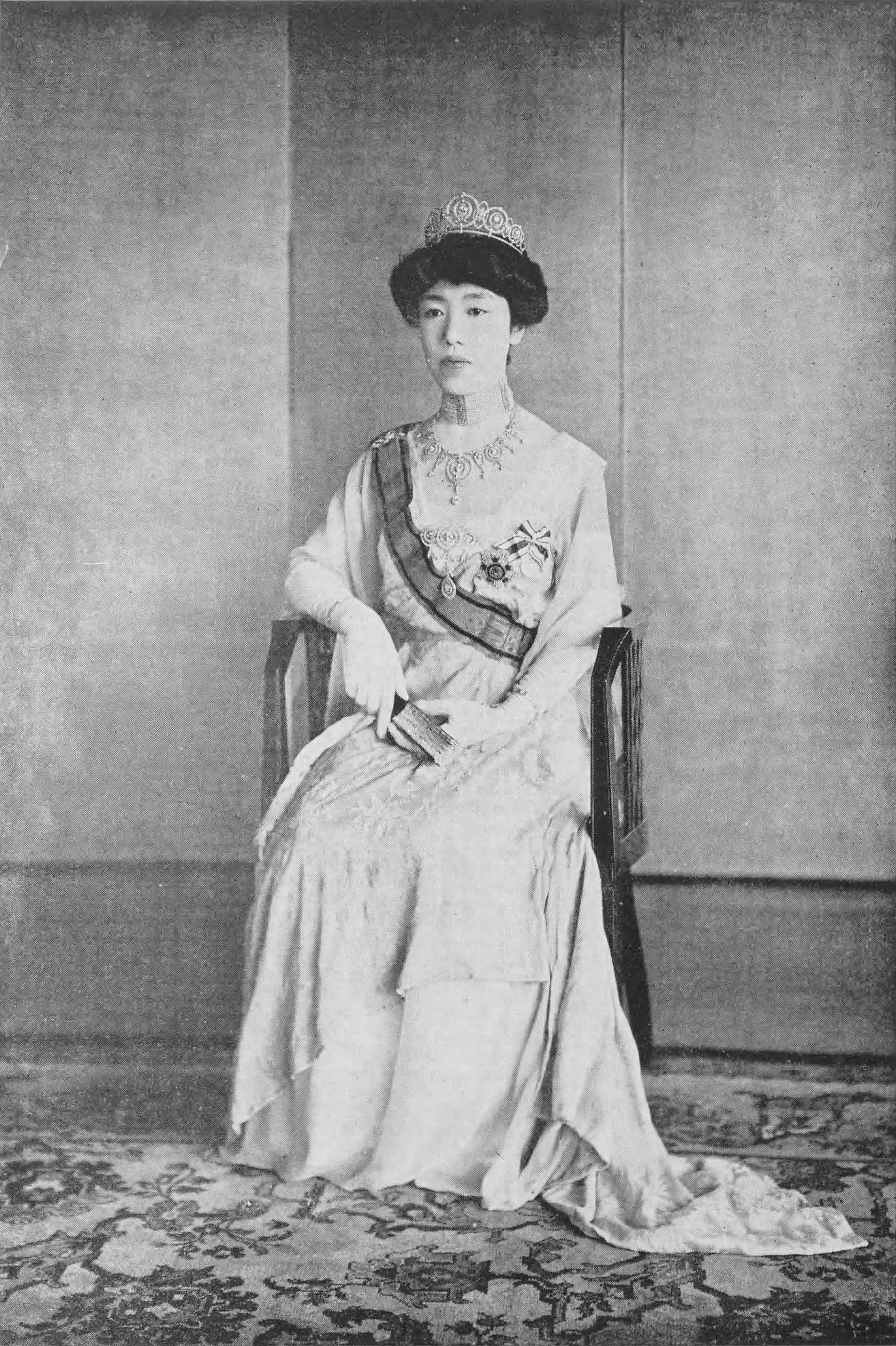
- Born: Toshiko, Princess Yasu (泰宮聡子内親王); 11 May 1896; Tokyo Prefecture, Empire of Japan
- Died: 5 March 1978 (aged 81); Tokyo, Japan
- Spouse: Prince Naruhiko Higashikuni (m. 1915)
- Children: Morihiro Higashikuni; Moromasa Higashikuni; Akitsune Higashikuni; Toshihiko Higashikuni
- Parents: Emperor Meiji (father); Sono Sachiko (mother)
- Relatives: Imperial House of Japan

Toshiko Higashikuni (東久邇 聡子, Higashikuni Toshiko), born Toshiko, Princess Yasu (泰宮聡子内親王, Yasu-no-miya Toshiko Naishinnō; 11 May 1896 – 5 March 1978), was the fourteenth child and ninth daughter of Emperor Meiji of Japan, and the seventh child and fifth daughter of Sono Sachiko, the Emperor's fifth concubine. She was the wife of Prince Naruhiko Higashikuni, who served as the Japanese prime minister from August to October 1945.

== Biography ==
Toshiko was born in Japan, the daughter of Emperor Meiji and Lady Sachiko. She held the childhood appellation "Yasu no miya" (Princess Yasu).

She married Prince Naruhiko Higashikuni on 18 May 1915. Emperor Meiji granted Prince Naruhiko the title Higashikuni-no-miya and permission to start a new branch of the imperial family before their marriage on 3 November 1906. The couple had four sons:

1. Prince Morihiro (盛厚王, Morohiro Ō; 6 May 1917 – 1 February 1969); married his first cousin once removed Shigeko, Princess Teru, the eldest daughter of Emperor Shōwa and Empress Kōjun.
2. Prince Moromasa (師正王, Moromasa Ō; 3 November 1918 – 1 September 1923); died in the Great Kantō earthquake.
3. Prince Akitsune (彰常王, Akitsune Ō; 13 May 1920 – 30 August 2006); renounced imperial title and created Marquis Awata Akitsune, 1940
4. Prince Toshihiko (俊彦王, Toshihiko Ō; 24 March 1929 – 15 April 2015); relocated to Lins, São Paulo, Brazil, 1950 after being adopted and becoming the heir to Kinu, widow of Tetsusuke Tarama.

In October 1947, the Higashikuni and the other branches of the Imperial Family other than patrilineal descendants of Emperor Taishō were divested of their titles and privileges during the Allied occupation of Japan and became commoners. Toshiko died on 5 March 1978, aged 81. She was the last surviving child of Emperor Meiji.

== Ancestry ==
Ancestors of Toshiko Higashikuni

8. Emperor Ninkō (1800–1846)
4. Emperor Kōmei (1831–1867)
9. Lady Ōgimachi Naoko (1803–1856)
2. Emperor Meiji (1852–1912)
10. Marquess Nakayama Tadayasu (1809–1888)
5. Lady Nakayama Yoshiko (1836–1907)
11. Matsura Aiko (1818–1906)
1. Toshiko, Princess Yasu
12. Sono Motoshige (1793–1840)
6. Count Sono Motosachi (1833–1905)
13. Matsura Kiko
3. Lady Sono Sachiko (1867–1947)
14. Koide Fusaoki, 8th Lord of Sonobe (1810–1862)
7. Koide
15. Matsudaira Minematsu

Toshiko Higashikuni Imperial House of Japan Born: 11 May 1896 Died: 5 March 1978
Unofficial roles
Preceded by Taka Suzuki	Spouse of prime minister of Japan; Aug – Oct 1945	Succeeded by Masako Shidehara
