= Morihiro Higashikuni =

Imperial Japanese Army officer

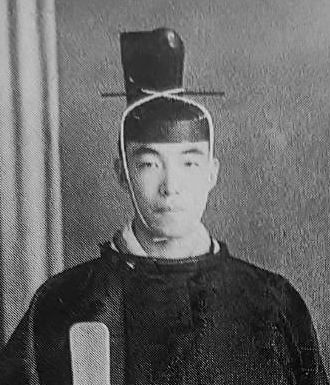
- Morihiro in 1943
- Born: Prince Morihiro (盛厚王); 6 May 1916; Tokyo City, Empire of Japan
- Died: 1 February 1969 (aged 52); St. Luke's International Hospital, Tokyo, Japan
- Title: Hereditary Prince Higashikuni
- Spouses: Shigeko, Princess Teru (m. 1943; died 1961) Yoshiko Terao (m. 1964)
- Children: Nobuhiko Higashikuni; Fumiko Higashikuni; Naohiko Higashikuni; Hidehiko Higashikuni; Yūko Higashikuni; Atsuhiko Higashikuni; Morihiko Higashikuni
- Parents: Naruhiko Higashikuni (father); Toshiko, Princess Yasu (mother)
- Family: Higashikuni no miya
- Military career
- Allegiance: Japan
- Branch: Imperial Japanese Army
- Service years: 1937–1945
- Rank: Major
- Unit: Kwantung Army
- Commands: First Battery, 1st Heavy Field Artillery Regiment, Kwantung Army
- Conflicts: Second Sino-Japanese War; World War II
- Awards: Grand Cordon of the Order of the Paulownia Flowers; Order of the Golden Kite (4th Class)

Morihiro Higashikuni (東久邇 盛厚, Higashikuni Morihiro), formerly Prince Morihiro (盛厚王, Morihiro Ō; 6 May 1916 – 1 February 1969) was an Imperial Japanese Army officer who was a member of a cadet line of the Japanese imperial family, grandson of Emperor Meiji and husband of Shigeko Higashikuni, eldest child of Emperor Hirohito and Empress Kōjun.

== Early life ==
Prince Morihiro was born on 6 May 1916, the first child of Prince Naruhiko Higashikuni (later served as Prime Minister in 1945), and his wife, Toshiko, Princess Yasu. Prince Morihiro had the distinction of being a grandson of Emperor Meiji and simultaneously both a first cousin and a son-in-law of Emperor Hirohito because his mother was the ninth daughter of Emperor Meiji, his wife was the eldest daughter of Emperor Hirohito and Empress Kōjun. He was born in Tokyo, and like most male members of the imperial family during the Empire of Japan, was groomed to pursue a career in the military from an early age.

== Military career ==
After graduation from the Gakushuin Peers’ School and the Central Military Preparatory School, Prince Higashikuni served for a session in the House of Peers. He graduated from the 49th class of Imperial Japanese Army Academy in June 1937, and was commissioned as a second lieutenant of field artillery in August. The following March, he was promoted to lieutenant in the IJA First Artillery Regiment, and was stationed in Manchukuo.

During the Nomonhan Incident in summer 1939, he commanded the First Battery, 1st Heavy Field Artillery Regiment of the Kwantung Army. He withdrew in face of the Soviet counter-offensive without orders during the heat of battle, and was transferred back to Japan on 2 August 1939. The incident was suppressed by Japanese military censors, but provided much propaganda for the Soviet Army. Despite this apparent blot on his service record, he was promoted to captain of the artillery in March 1941. He attended the Army War College from December 1942 to December 1943, and on graduation was promoted to major and placed on the reserve list.

== Marriage and family ==
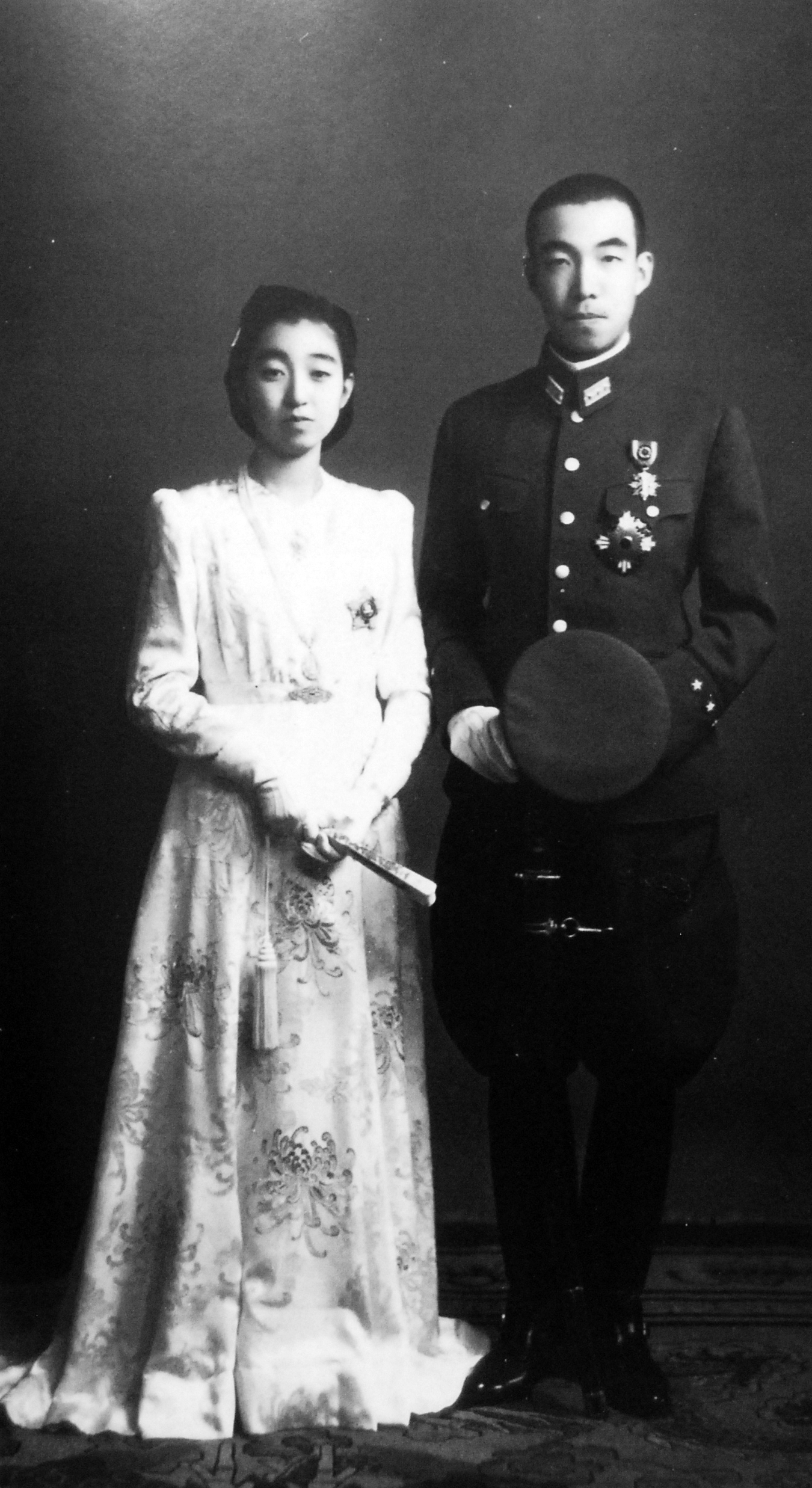
At the marriage ceremony in 1943

On 10 October 1943, Prince Morihiro Higashikuni married seventeen-year-old Shigeko, Princess Teru (9 December 1925 – 23 July 1961), the eldest daughter of Emperor Shōwa and Empress Kōjun, who was widely known by her childhood appellation Teru-no-miya. The bride and groom were related several times over through their common descent from Emperor Meiji and Prince Kuni Asahiko (the father of Prince Naruhiko Higashikuni and the grandfather of Empress Kōjun).

The couple had five children, the last three of whom were born after the Higashikuni family was removed from the Imperial Household register:

1. Prince Nobuhiko Higashikuni (信彦王, Nobuhiko-ō; 10 March 1945 – 20 March 2019); married Miss Yoshiko Shimada in 1972, and had one son, Masahiko Higashikuni (b. 1973).
2. Princess Fumiko Higashikuni (文子女王, Fumiko joō; born 23 December 1946); married Mr. Kazutoshi Omura later to Mr. Takagi Daikichi.
3. Hidehiko Higashikuni (東久邇 秀彦; born 30 June 1949): adopted by the Mibu family as "Motohiro Mibu".
4. Naohiko Higashikuni (東久邇 真彦; born 1953); married to Ms. Kazuko Sato, with two sons, Teruhiko and Mutsuhiko.
5. Yūko Higashikuni (東久邇 優子; born 1954) married Mr. Azuma Naooki.

His first wife, former Princess Shigeko, died of cancer in July 1961. In 1964, Morihiro Higashikuni married Yoshiko Terao (1927–2011). The second marriage produced two children:

1. Atsuhiko Higashikuni (東久邇 厚彦; born 1966)
2. Morihiko Higashikuni (東久邇 盛彦; born 1967)

== Later life ==
In October 1947, the Higashikuni and other branches of the Japanese Imperial Family were divested of their titles and privileges during the Allied occupation of Japan and became commoners. As a commoner, he attempted several unsuccessful business ventures before eventually becoming the chief of the research division of the Hokkaido Colliery & Steamship Company. He died of lung cancer at St. Luke's International Hospital in Tokyo in 1969.

== Ancestry ==
Ancestors of Morihiro Higashikuni

16. Prince Fushimi Sadayuki
8. Prince Fushimi Kuniie
17. Fujiwara Seiko
4. Prince Kuni Asahiko
9. Torikoji Nobuko
2. Prince Naruhiko Higashikuni
5. Terao Utako
1. Morihiro Higashikuni
24. Emperor Ninkō
12. Emperor Kōmei
25. Ōgimachi Naoko
6. Emperor Meiji
26. Nakayama Tadayasu
13. Nakayama Yoshiko
27. Matsura Aiko
3. Toshiko, Princess Yasu
28. Sono Motoshige
14. Count Sono Motosachi
29. Matsura Kiko
7. Lady Sono Sachiko
30. Lord Koide Fusaoki
15. Koide
31. Matsudaira Minematsu

== Gallery ==
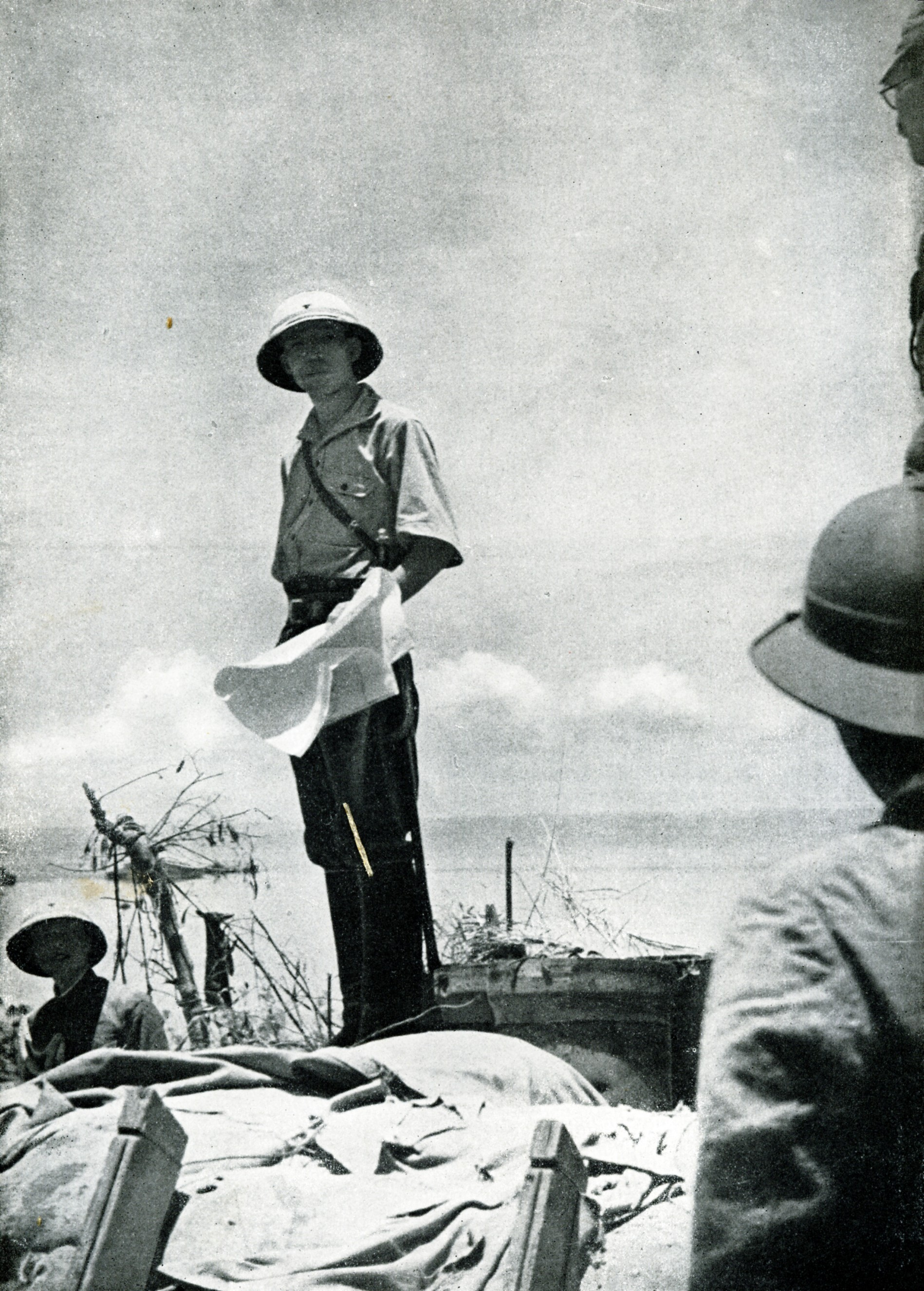
Prince Morihiro in the Philippines during World War II
