= Japanese submarine tender Komahashi =

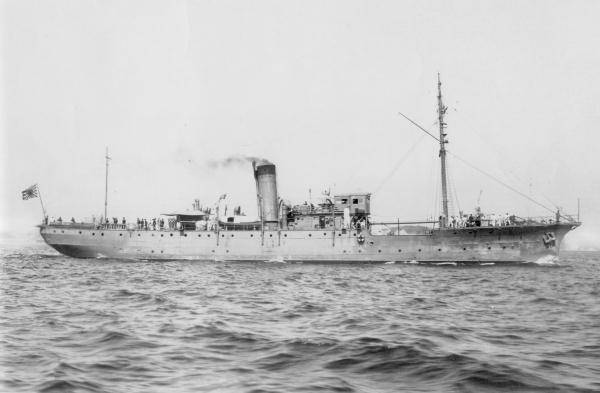
- Komahashi in 1933

History
- Name: Komahashi
- Ordered: 1911 Fiscal Year
- Builder: Sasebo Naval Arsenal
- Laid down: 7 October 1912
- Launched: 21 May 1913
- Completed: 20 January 1914
- Decommissioned: 30 November 1945
- Reclassified: 7 October 1912 as cargo ship; 23 May 1914 as submersible tender; 16 August 1914 as 2nd class coast defence ship; 1 April 1920 as torpedo recovery ship; 1 December 1924 as submarine tender
- Fate: Sunk by American aircraft in Owase, 28 July 1945.

General characteristics before April 1932
- Type: Cargo ship/submarine tender
- Displacement: 1,125 long tons (1,143 t) standard; 1,230 long tons (1,250 t) standing
- Length: 64.01 m (210 ft 0 in) waterline
- Beam: 10.67 m (35 ft 0 in)
- Draught: 3.55 m (11 ft 8 in)
- Propulsion: 2 × three expansion stages reciprocating engines; 4 × scotch boilers; 2 shafts, 1,824 shp (1,360 kW)
- Speed: 13.9 knots (16.0 mph; 25.7 km/h)
- Complement: 86
- Armament: in 1914; 3 × QF 12-pounder 12 cwt naval gun

General characteristics after November 1932
- Type: Survey ship
- Displacement: 1,661 long tons (1,688 t) standing
- Propulsion: 2 × Ikegai model diesels; 2 × Kampon coal/oil-fired boilers; 2 shafts, 1,800 shp (1,300 kW)
- Speed: 14.0 knots (16.1 mph; 25.9 km/h)
- Complement: 102
- Armament: around 1941; 2 × QF 12-pounder 12 cwt naval gun; 1 × 8 cm/40 3rd Year Type naval gun; 6 × Type 96 25 mm AA guns; depth charges; in 1945; 1 × 8 cm/40 3rd Year Type naval gun; 10 × Type 96 25 mm AA guns; 2 × Type 93 13 mm AA guns; 2 × Type 92 heavy machine guns; depth charges

Komahashi (駒橋), was an auxiliary vessel operated by the Imperial Japanese Navy, serving from the 1910s through World War II. Her classification changed numerous times during her operational life. Although officially designated as a submarine tender for most of her career, Komahashi very rarely functioned in this role, but was used instead as an oceanographic survey vessel throughout the Pacific, and as a kaibokan escort vessel for convoys of merchant ships during the Pacific War.

== Background ==
The Imperial Japanese Navy received its first submarines during the Russo-Japanese War, but these vessels were not operational until after the war ended. During the post-war period, submarine warfare was given a low priority for development, as the early submarines were regarded as unsafe, and useful only for short-range coastal point defense.

== Design ==
Komahashi was designed and built as the Cargo ship Komahashi Maru (運送船 駒橋丸, Unsōsen Komahashi Maru) at the Sasebo Naval Arsenal. She was laid down on 7 October 1912 and was launched on 21 May 1913. She was specifically intended for the role of supplying the Imperial Japanese Navy's Mako Guard District, located in the Pescadores between Taiwan and China. Her design was that of a standard three island merchant freighter, with two coal-fired Hayabara boilers producing 1825 shp, driving a single shaft, with a design speed of 14 knots. In 1932, she was modernized with two Ikegai diesel engines. She was armed with two QF 12-pounder 12 cwt naval guns and one 8 cm/40 3rd Year Type naval gun.

== Operational career ==
With the start of World War I, from 20 January 1914, Komahashi was based at Sasebo Naval District, and was converted into a submarine tender on 23 May 1914. However, soon after, on 16 August 1914, she was re-classified as a 2nd class kaibokan and assigned to the 4th Torpedo Division.

On 1 April 1920 her classification was changed to that of a torpedo boat tender (水雷母艦, Suiraibokan), but her small size made her unsuitable for the task. Although on 1 December 1924 she was classified once again as a submarine tender, her primary task for the next several years was that of a survey vessel, charting the area around the Pescadores and the China coast. On 1 October 1931, Komahashi was assigned to the Yokosuka Naval District, and was refitted at the Yokosuka Naval Arsenal in early 1932 with more powerful diesel engines and survey ship facilities, a process that lasted until November 1932. Upon re-launching, she surveyed around the Luzon Strait, the South Seas Mandate, the Kuril Islands and the Kamchatka Peninsula, collecting data on ocean currents, salinity, subsea topography and fisheries resources. One of her discoveries was the Komahashi Seamount, an underwater volcano at the northern end of the Kyushu–Palau Ridge in the Philippine Sea.

On 19 August 1937, Komahashi was assigned to the IJN 3rd Fleet and participated in combat operations along the China coast during the Second Sino-Japanese War. On 10 October 1937, she was assigned to the China Area Fleet.

From June 1939, Komahashi was once again assigned to the Yokosuka Naval District, and assigned to surveying missions and patrols of the South Seas Mandate area for the potential development of seaplane bases and naval harbors, and was serving in this capacity at the time of the attack on Pearl Harbor on 7 December 1941. At some time during 1941, she was also fitted with depth charge racks and six Type 96 25-mm AA guns.

During early 1942, Komahashi remained based at Yokosuka, and provided short-range escort for inbound and outbound convoys. On 7 July 1942, Komahashi participated in the rescue mission for survivors of the SS Haruna Maru, a 10420-ton passenger liner that had run aground off Omaezaki on a transport mission for the Imperial Japanese Army. After the conclusion of the rescue, Komahashi was reassigned to the IJN 5th Fleet for operations in northern waters. During August–September 1942 Komahashi surveyed the Aleutian Islands during the Japanese invasion. She was heavily damaged by U.S. aircraft at Kiska on 29 September and was forced to withdraw to Yokosuka Naval Arsenal for repairs. On 1 November, she was once again assigned to the Yokosuka Naval District, where she made 38 runs as a convoy escort and transport in waters around the Japanese home islands throughout 1943.

On 16 January 1944, Komahashi was declared flagship of the 3rd Escort Group, IJN Escort Fleet and based in Owase, Mie Prefecture, escorting shipping around the Kii Peninsula. Later that year, she received more anti-aircraft guns, including additional Type 96s, two Type 93 13.2 mm AA guns and two Type 92 7.7mm machine guns.

On 15 April 1945 Komahashi was assigned to the role of flagship of the 4th Special Attack Division, based at Owase. The division included 60 Shin'yō suicide motorboats, 24 Kairyu midget submarines and four Kaiten human torpedoes.

It was in this role that she was attacked by Allied aircraft of Task Force 38 on 27 July of that year and sank in shallow waters at Owase. Komahashi was abandoned until the surrender of Japan and officially struck from the Navy Directory on 30 November 1945. On 20 September 1948, she was refloated and towed to Nagoya, where she was salvaged for scrap in 1949.
