= Prince Naruhiko Higashikuni =

Prime Minister of Japan in 1945

- 東久邇宮稔彦王
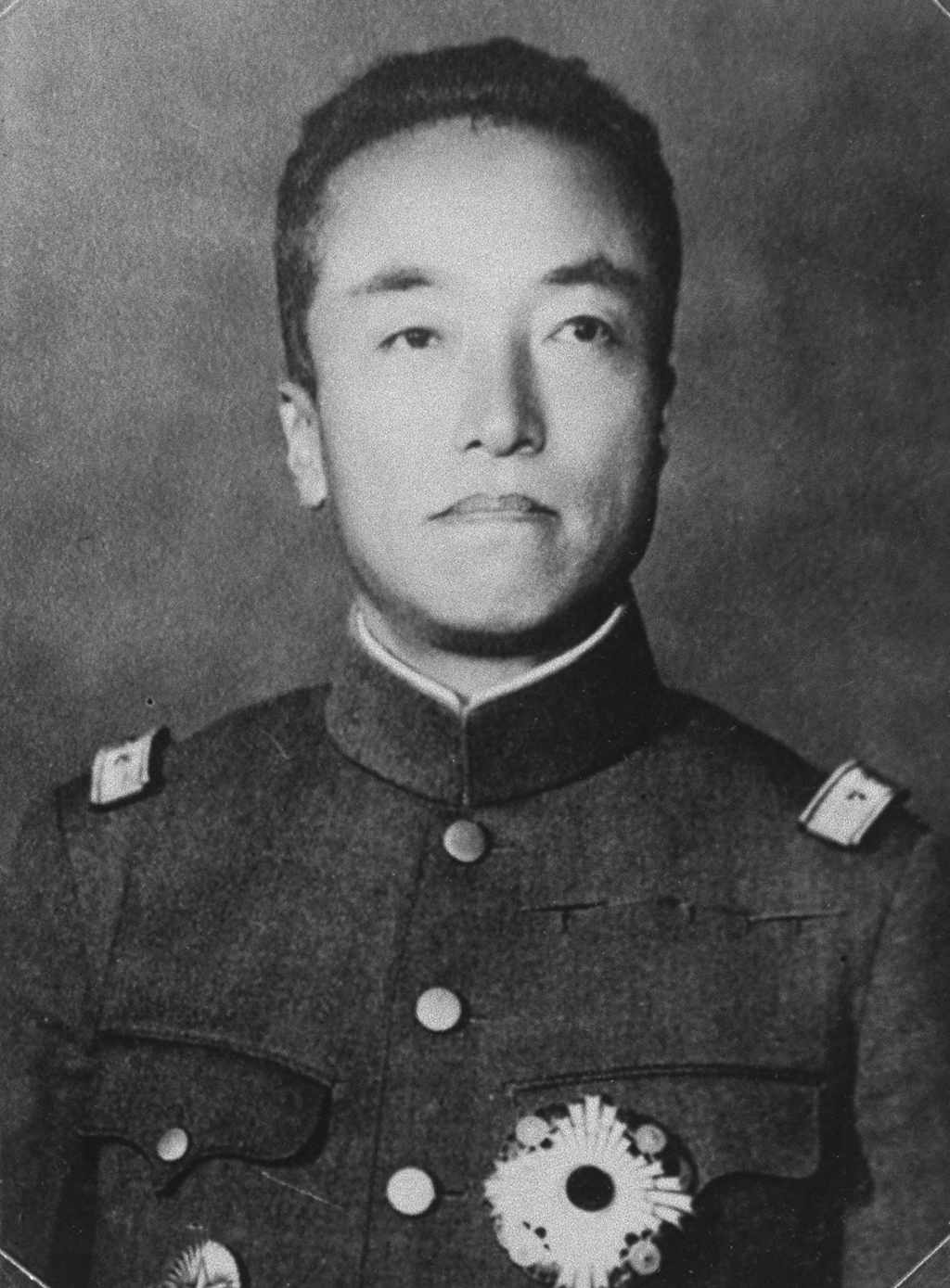
- Formal portrait of Prince Higashikuni

Prime Minister of Japan
- In office 17 August 1945 – 9 October 1945
- Monarch: Hirohito
- Preceded by: Kantarō Suzuki
- Succeeded by: Kijūrō Shidehara

Minister of the Army
- In office 17 August 1945 – 23 August 1945
- Prime Minister: Himself
- Preceded by: Korechika Anami
- Succeeded by: Sadamu Shimomura

Member of the House of Peers
- In office 3 December 1907 – 23 May 1946 Hereditary peerage

Personal details
- Born: 3 December 1887 (Note: Although he was actually born in late September, the princely house—citing a disparity in social status between the mothers (Sugako Tsunoda, mother of Prince Yasuhiko, held a higher rank than Utako Terao, mother of Prince Naruhiko)—recorded Prince Naruhiko as having been born after Prince Yasuhiko, despite his actual birth having occurred earlier.) Kyoto, Japan
- Died: 20 January 1990 (aged 102) Tokyo, Japan
- Party: Independent
- Spouse: Toshiko, Princess Yasu (m. 1915; died 1978)
- Children: Morihiro Higashikuni; Moromasa Higashikuni; Akitsune Higashikuni; Toshihiko Higashikuni
- Parents: Prince Kuni Asahiko (father); Terao Utako (mother)
- Education: Army Academy; Army War College
- Awards: Order of the Chrysanthemum; Order of the Rising Sun with Paulownia Flowers, Order of the Golden Kite
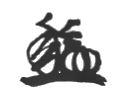
- Signature

Military service
- Allegiance: Empire of Japan
- Branch/service: Imperial Japanese Army
- Years of service: 1908–1945
- Rank: General
- Commands: IJA 4th Division, Imperial Japanese Army Air Service, IJA 2nd Army, General Defense Command
- Battles/wars: Second Sino-Japanese War; World War II; Pacific War

Prince Higashikuni
- Tenure: 3 November 1906 – 14 October 1947
- Successor: Title abolished

Head of the House of Higashikuni
- Tenure: 3 November 1906 – 20 January 1990
- Successor: Nobuhiko Higashikuni

Japanese name
- Kanji: 東久邇宮稔彦王
Transcriptions
- Romanization: Higashikuni-no-miya Naruhiko Ō

Naruhiko, Prince Higashikuni (東久邇宮稔彦王, Higashikuni-no-miya Naruhiko Ō; 3 December 1887 – 20 January 1990) was a member of the Japanese imperial family and general of the Imperial Japanese Army (IJA) who served as the prime minister of Japan from 17 August 1945 until his resignation two months later on 9 October. He is the only member of the Japanese imperial family to head a cabinet, and Japan's shortest-serving prime minister, serving for only 54 days.

Born in Kyoto, Prince Higashikuni was a son of Prince Kuni Asahiko and married Toshiko, Princess Yasu, a daughter of Emperor Meiji, thus making him an uncle-in-law of Emperor Hirohito. He graduated from the Army Academy and War College, and studied military tactics in France from 1920 to 1926. Upon his return to Japan, he was promoted to general in 1930 and held several military posts, including as commander of the General Defense Command from 1941 to 1944.

Prince Higashikuni's appointment as prime minister following the war reflected a hope that his prestige as an imperial prince would help to unite the defeated country. He presided over the signing of the surrender on 2 September 1945 and the disbandment of the armed forces before resigning in opposition to an order by the Allied occupation authorities to abolish the Peace Preservation Law. He became a commoner after the abolition of the princely houses in 1947, and later formed a Buddhist sect. He is the longest-lived of Japan's premiers, dying in 1990 at the age of 102.

== Early life ==
Prince Naruhiko was born on 3 December 1887 in Kyoto, the ninth son of Prince Kuni Asahiko (Kuni no miya Asahiko Shinnō) and the court lady Terao Utako. His father, Prince Asahiko, was a son of Prince Fushimi Kuniie (Fushimi no miya Kuniie Shinnō), the twentieth head of the Fushimi-no-miya, the oldest of the sesshu shinnōke or cadet branches of the imperial dynasty from whom an emperor might be chosen in default of a direct heir. Prince Naruhiko was a half-brother of Prince Kuni Kuniyoshi, the father of the future Empress Kōjun, the wife of Emperor Shōwa. His other half-brothers, Prince Asaka Yasuhiko, Prince Nashimoto Morimasa, and Prince Kaya Kuninori, all formed new branches of the imperial family (ōke) during the Meiji period.

== Marriage and family ==
Emperor Meiji granted Prince Naruhiko the title Higashikuni-no-miya and permission to start a new branch of the imperial family on 3 November 1906. Prince Naruhiko married the ninth daughter of Emperor Meiji, Toshiko, Princess Yasu (11 May 1896 – 5 March 1978), on 18 May 1915. The couple had four sons.

1. Prince Higashikuni Morihiro (盛厚王, Morohiro ō; 6 May 1916 – 1 February 1969); married Shigeko, Princess Teru, the eldest daughter of Emperor Shōwa and Empress Kōjun.
2. Prince Moromasa (師正王, Moromasa ō; 3 November 1918 – 1 September 1923); died in the Great Kantō earthquake.
3. Prince Akitsune (彰常王, Akitsune ō; 13 May 1920 – 30 August 2006); renounced imperial title and created Marquis Awata Akitsune, 1940
4. Prince Toshihiko (俊彦王, Toshihiko ō; 24 March 1929 – 15 April 2015); renounced imperial title and created Count Tarama Toshihiko, 1943; relocated to Lins, São Paulo, Brazil, 1950.

== Military career ==
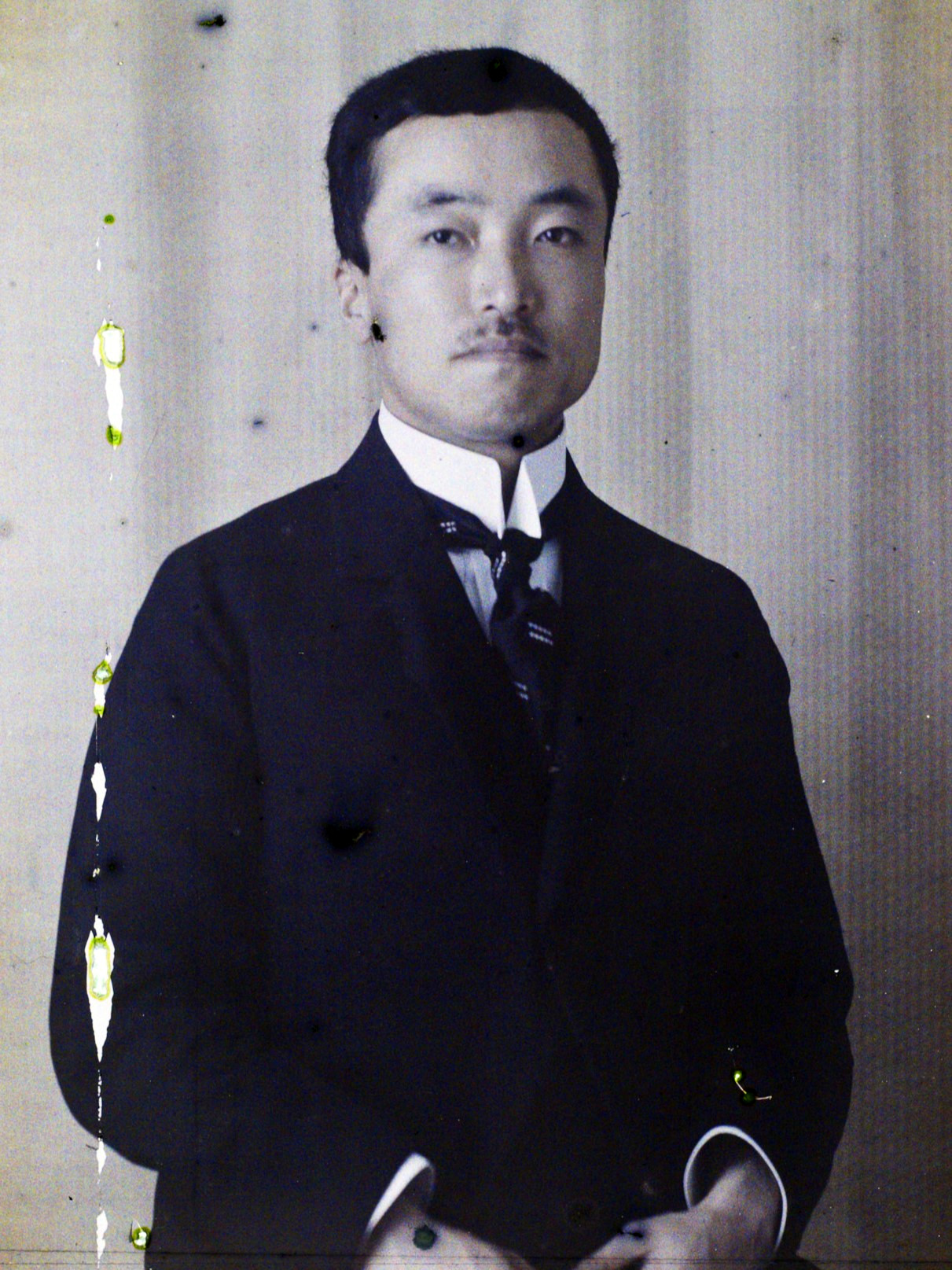
Autochrome portrait by Auguste Léon, 1920

Prince Higashikuni Naruhiko was a career officer in the Imperial Japanese Army. In 1908, he graduated from the Imperial Japanese Army Academy as a second lieutenant, was promoted to lieutenant in 1910 and to captain in 1913. In 1914, he graduated from the Army War College. He was commissioned a captain in the 29th Infantry Brigade and promoted to major in the IJA 7th Division in 1915.

Prince Higashikuni then studied military tactics at the École Spéciale Militaire de Saint-Cyr and École Polytechnique in Paris France, from 1920 to 1926, during which time he was promoted to lieutenant-colonel in 1920 and to colonel in 1926. Always somewhat of a rebel, Prince Higashikuni's behavior in Paris scandalized the Imperial Court. He had a French mistress, and enjoyed fast cars and high living. He left his wife and children in Japan, and the death of his second son did not prompt his return. In 1926, the Imperial Household Ministry dispatched a chamberlain to Paris to collect him.

Upon his return to Japan, he was assigned to the Imperial Japanese Army General Staff Headquarters. Promoted to major-general in August 1930 and appointed commander of the 5th Infantry Brigade (1930–1934), he was promoted to lieutenant-general in August 1934 and given command of the IJA 4th Division (1934–1937). After the start of the Second Sino-Japanese War, he headed the Imperial Japanese Army Air Service (1937–1938), and the IJA 2nd Army stationed in China from 1938–1939. He was promoted to general in August 1939. According to a memo discovered by historian Yoshiaki Yoshimi, Prince Higashikuni authorized the use of poison gas against the Chinese on 16 August 1938. Prince Higashikuni returned to Japan in January 1939. Promoted to full general, the prince was awarded the Order of the Golden Kite, 1st Class in 1940.

Before Japan entered the Second World War, on 15 October 1941, outgoing Prime Minister Fumimaro Konoe proposed Prince Higashikuni to Emperor Shōwa as his successor for prime minister. Konoe believed that only a member of the Imperial Family with a distinguished military background could restrain the pro-war faction led by Generals Hajime Sugiyama, Hideki Tōjō, and Akira Mutō. Prince Higashikuni was also the choice of both Chief of Staffs of the Army and the Navy.

However, both Emperor Shōwa and the Lord Privy Seal, Kido Kōichi, believed that it would be inappropriate for a member of the Imperial Family to serve in that position, as he could be blamed for anything which went wrong in the war. Thus, two days later, the emperor chose army minister General Hideki Tōjō as prime minister. In 1946, he explained this decision: "I actually thought Prince Higashikuni suitable as Chief of Staff of the Army; but I think the appointment of a member of the Imperial house to a political office must be considered very carefully. Above all, in time of peace this is fine, but when there is a fear that there may even be a war, then more importantly, considering the welfare of the imperial house, I wonder about the wisdom of a member of the Imperial family serving [as prime minister]."

Six weeks later, Japan attacked Pearl Harbor. Prince Higashikuni served as commander of the General Defense Command from 1941 to 1944.

Prince Higashikuni remained steadfast in his opposition to the war with the Allied powers, and was part of the conspiracy (with Prince Yasuhiko Asaka, Prince Nobuhito Takamatsu, and former prime minister Konoe) which finally ousted Tōjō in July 1944 following the fall of Saipan to American forces. The American researchers with SCAP also found out that he had planned towards the end of the war to depose Emperor Shōwa, placing the Crown Prince Akihito on the throne instead, governing the country with himself as regent.

== Prime Minister ==
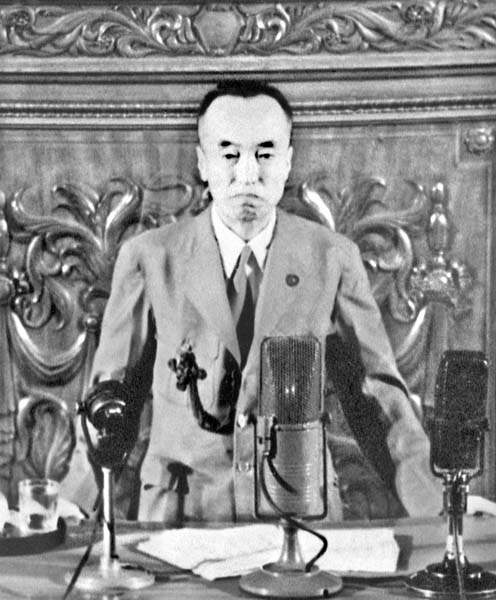
- Higashikuni in 1945
- Premiership of Prince Naruhiko Higashikuni; 17 August 1945 – 9 October 1945
- Monarch: Emperor Shōwa
- Cabinet: Higashikuni Cabinet
- Party: Imperial Family; (Allied occupation)
- Seat: Naikaku Sōri Daijin Kantei
- Emblem of the Government of Japan

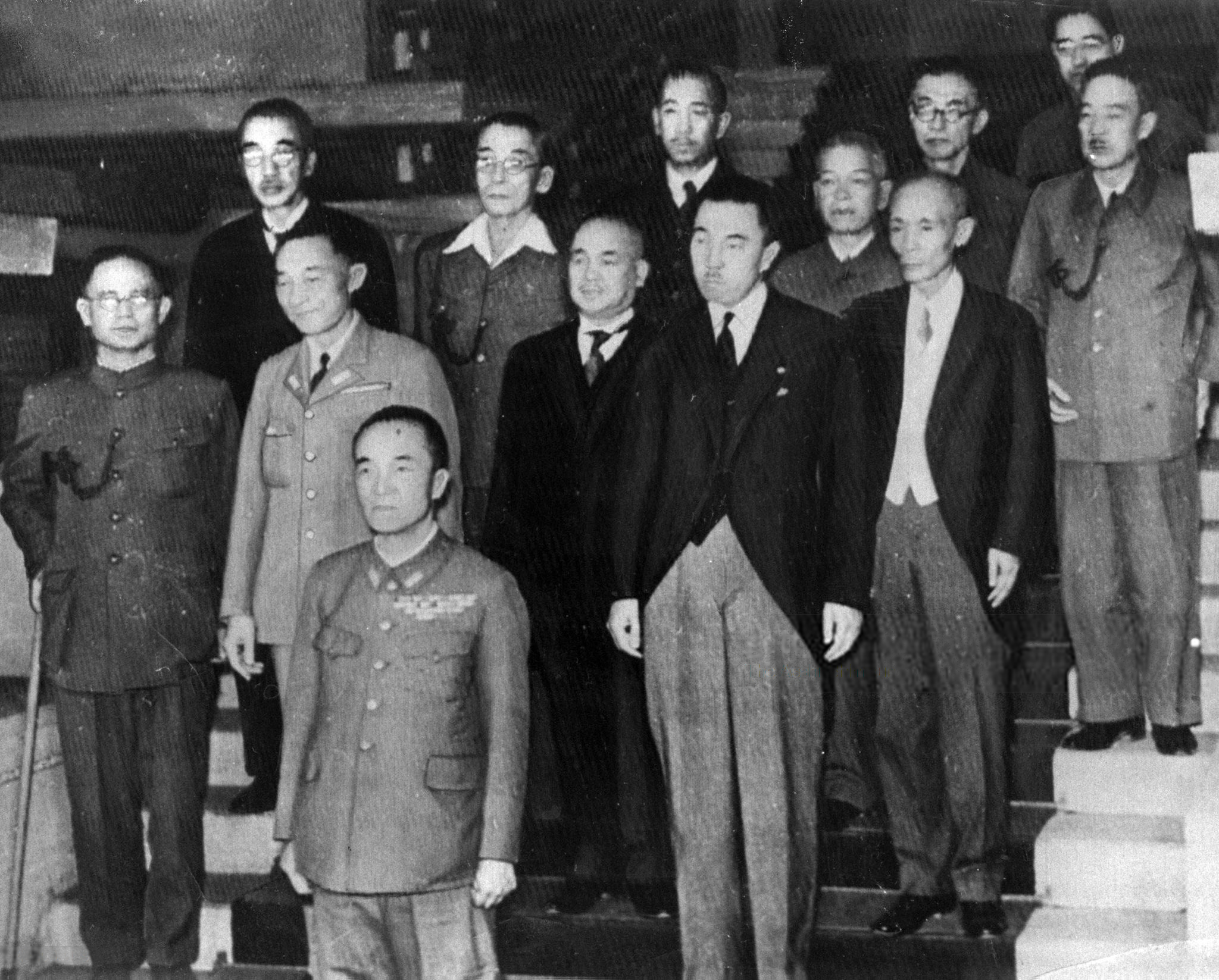
Higashikuni Cabinet with Mamoru Shigemitsu, Mitsumasa Yonai and Fumimaro Konoe in front row.

After the course of the war turned against Japan, and the decision was made to accept the Potsdam Declaration, the emperor Shōwa appointed Prince Higashikuni to be prime minister on 17 August 1945, replacing navy Admiral Kantarō Suzuki. The mission of the Higashikuni Cabinet was twofold: first, to ensure the orderly cessation of hostilities and demobilization of the Japanese armed forces; and second, to reassure the Japanese people that the imperial institution remained secure. Prince Higashikuni resigned in October over a dispute with the Allied occupation forces over the repeal of the 1925 Peace Preservation Law. This law was largely intended to prevent the spread of Communism to Japan.

== Post-premiership ==
On 27 February 1946, Prince Higashikuni gave an interview to the Yomiuri-Hōchi newspaper in which he claimed that many members of the imperial family had approved Emperor Shōwa's abdication, with Nobuhito, Prince Takamatsu serving as regent until Crown Prince Akihito came of age. In the government, only Prime Minister Kijūrō Shidehara and the Imperial Household Minister Yoshitami Matsudaira opposed this. On 4 March 1946, Higashikuni gave a similar interview to the Associated Press (reported in The New York Times) indicating that he had proposed to the emperor possible dates for abdication.

In 1946, Prince Higashikuni asked the emperor for permission to renounce his membership in the Imperial Family and become a commoner. The emperor denied the request. However, along with other members of the Imperial branch families (shinnōke and ōke), Prince Higashikuni lost his title and most of his wealth as a result of the American occupation's abolition of the princely houses on 17 October 1947.

As a private citizen, Higashikuni operated several unsuccessful retail enterprises (including a provisions store, second-hand goods store, and dressmaker's shop). He even created his own new Zen Buddhism-based religious sect, the Higashikuni-kyo, which was subsequently banned by the American occupation authorities.

The former prince became the honorary chairman of the International Martial Arts Federation (IMAF) in 1957, and honorary president of several other organizations.

In 1958, Higashikuni published his wartime journals under the title, Ichi Kozoku no Senso Nikki (or The War Diary of a Member of the Imperial Family). He published his autobiographical memoirs, Higashikuni Nikki, in 1968.

== Death and legacy ==
Higashikuni died of heart failure in Tokyo on 20 January 1990 at the age of 102 years, 48 days, having outlived his wife, two of his sons, his siblings, and his nephew, Emperor Shōwa. Higashikuni is today mainly remembered as the first postwar prime minister of Japan. He is the shortest-serving prime minister, resigning after eight weeks (54 days) and one of the longest-lived prime ministers of all time, along with Antoine Pinay, Willem Drees and Christopher Hornsrud. At his death, he was the last surviving full general of the Imperial Japanese Army. From 14 May 1988, when former prime minister of the Netherlands Willem Drees died, until his own death, Higashikuni was the world's oldest living former head of government.

== Gallery ==
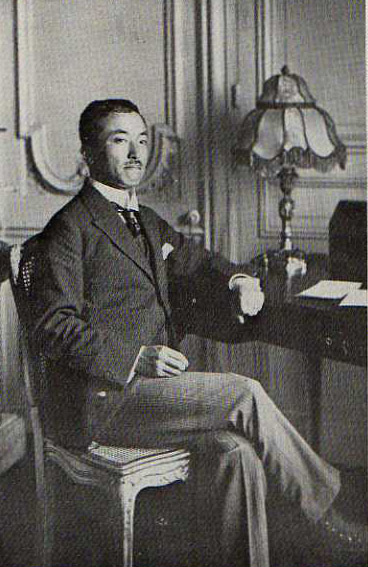
Prince Naruhiko in France

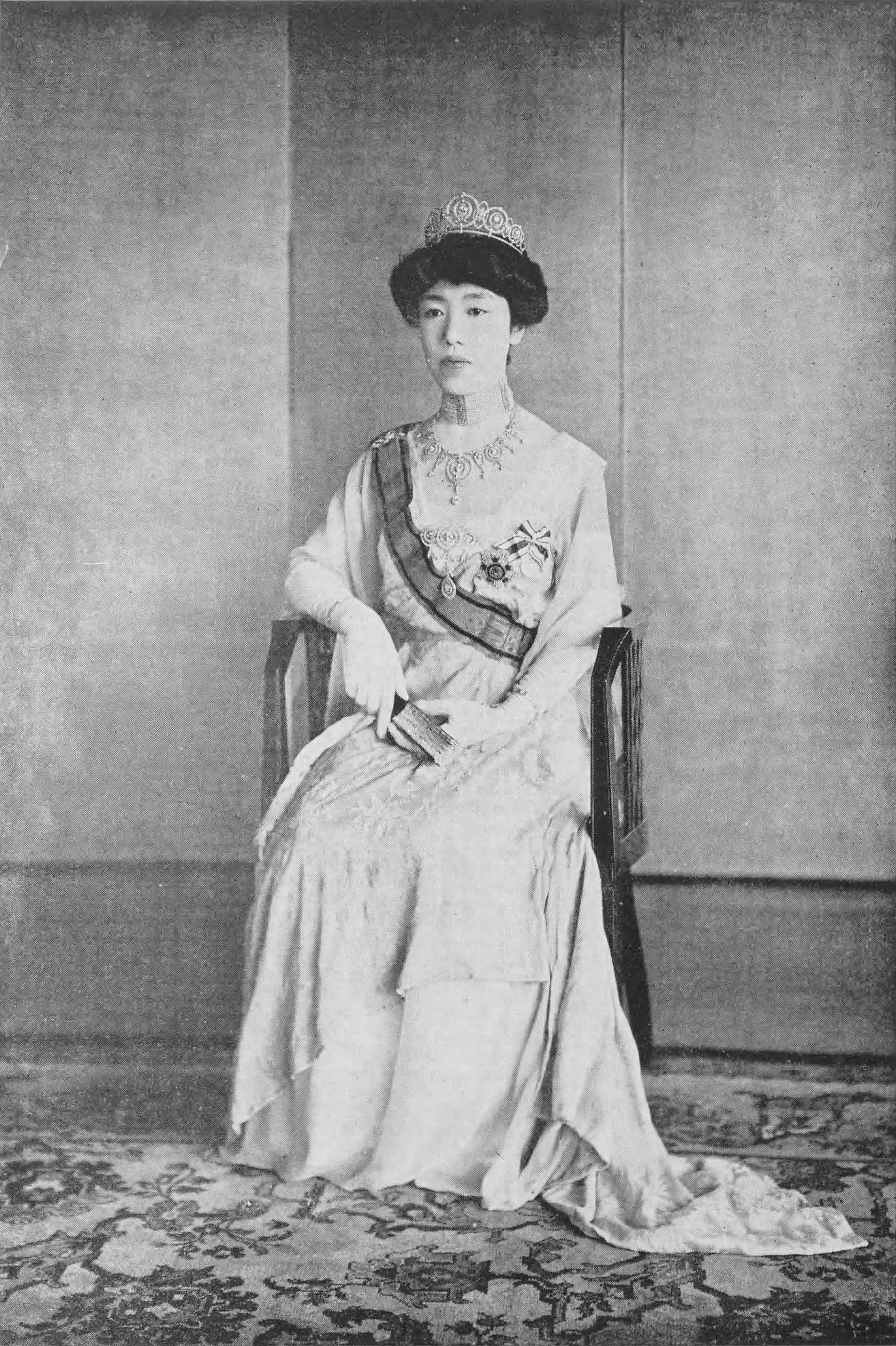
Princess Toshiko, Emperor Meiji's daughter (wife)

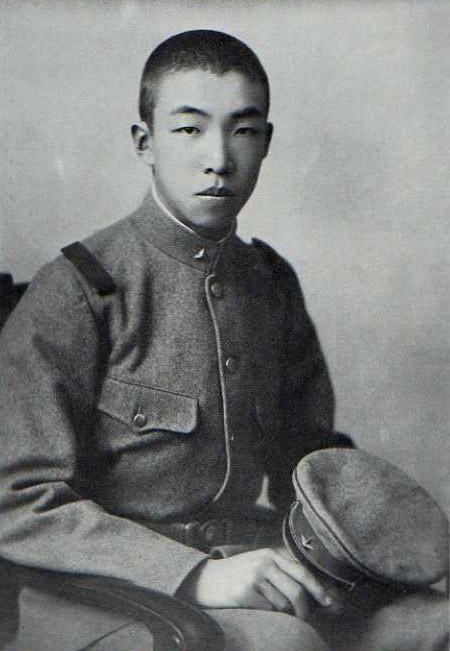
Prince Morihiro (son and heir)

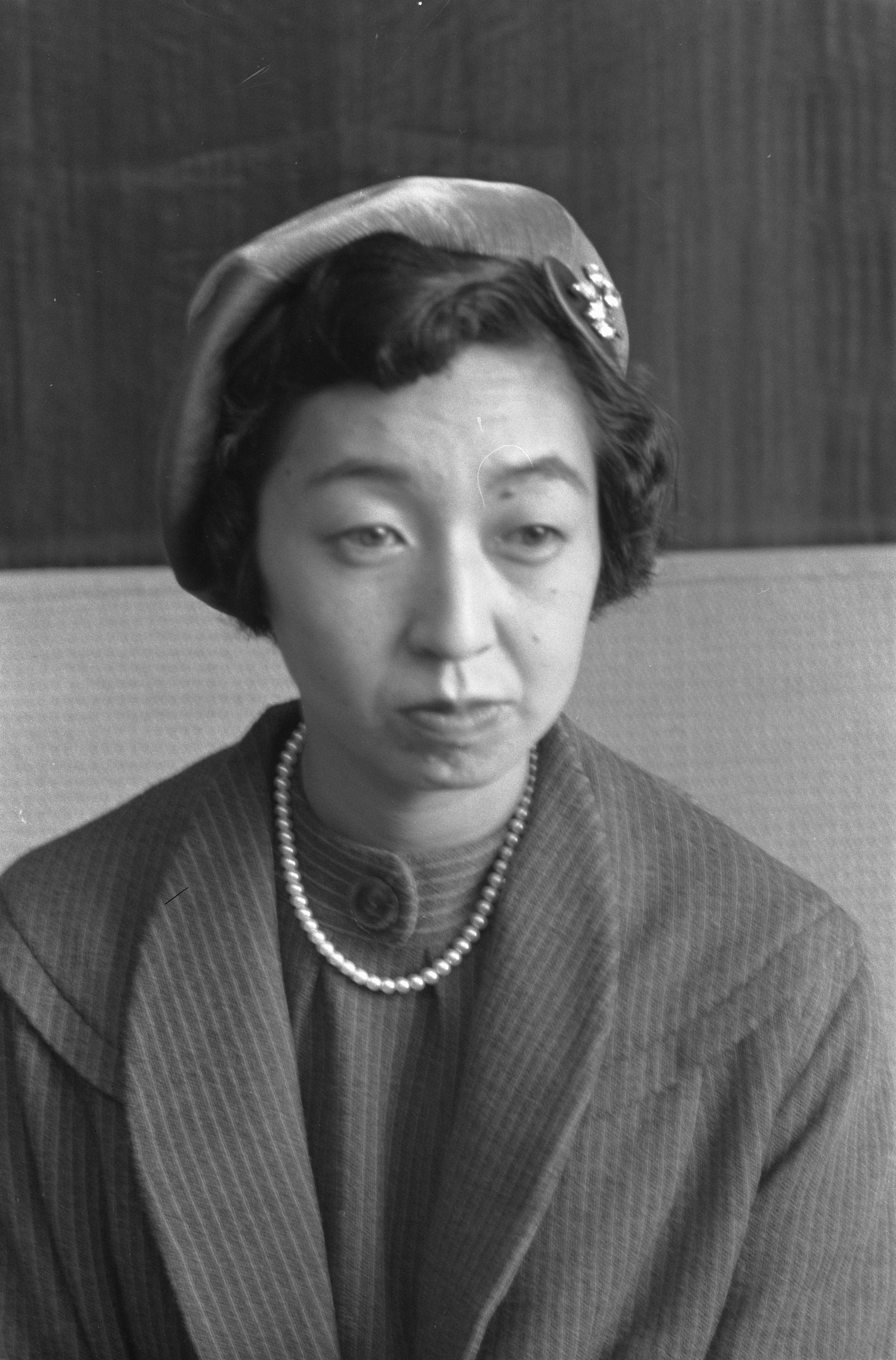
Princess Shigeko, Emperor Shōwa's daughter (daughter-in-law)

== Notes ==
Political offices
Preceded by Kantarō Suzuki	Prime Minister of Japan; Aug – Oct 1945	Succeeded by Kijūrō Shidehara
Preceded by Korechika Anami	Minister of the Army; Aug 1945	Succeeded by Sadamu Shimomura
Military offices
Preceded by Otozō Yamada	Commander, General Defense Command; Dec 1941 – Apr 1945	Command abolished
Preceded by Toshizō Nishio	Commander, IJA 2nd Army; Apr 1938 – Dec 1939	Succeeded by Sadamu Shimomura
Preceded by Motoo Furushō	Chief of the Army Aviation Headquarters; Aug 1937 – Apr 1938	Succeeded by Hideki Tojo
Preceded by Hisaichi Terauchi	Commander, IJA 4th Division; Aug 1934 – Dec 1935	Succeeded by Yoshitsugu Tatekawa
Preceded by Jirō Tamon	Commander, IJA 2nd Division; Aug 1933 – Aug 1934	Succeeded by Shinji Hata
Records
Preceded by Willem Drees	Oldest living state leader 14 May 1988 – 20 January 1990	Succeeded by Antoine Pinay
