= Fusako Tsunoda =

Fusako Tsunoda (角田房子; December 5, 1914–January 1, 2010) was a Japanese writer.

== Biography ==
Tsunoda was born Fusa Tsunoda on December 5, 1914, in Tokyo, Japan. She studied at Sorbonne University and lived in Paris for several years. She began writing in 1955 while living abroad. She wrote about a wide variety of topics ranging from the Japanese colonization of Manchuria to Japanese immigration to Brazil. Her work won several awards. She died on January 1, 2010.
