= Gakushūin =

Japanese educational institution in Tokyo

Coordinates: 35°43′08″N 139°42′40″E

Gakushuin emblem

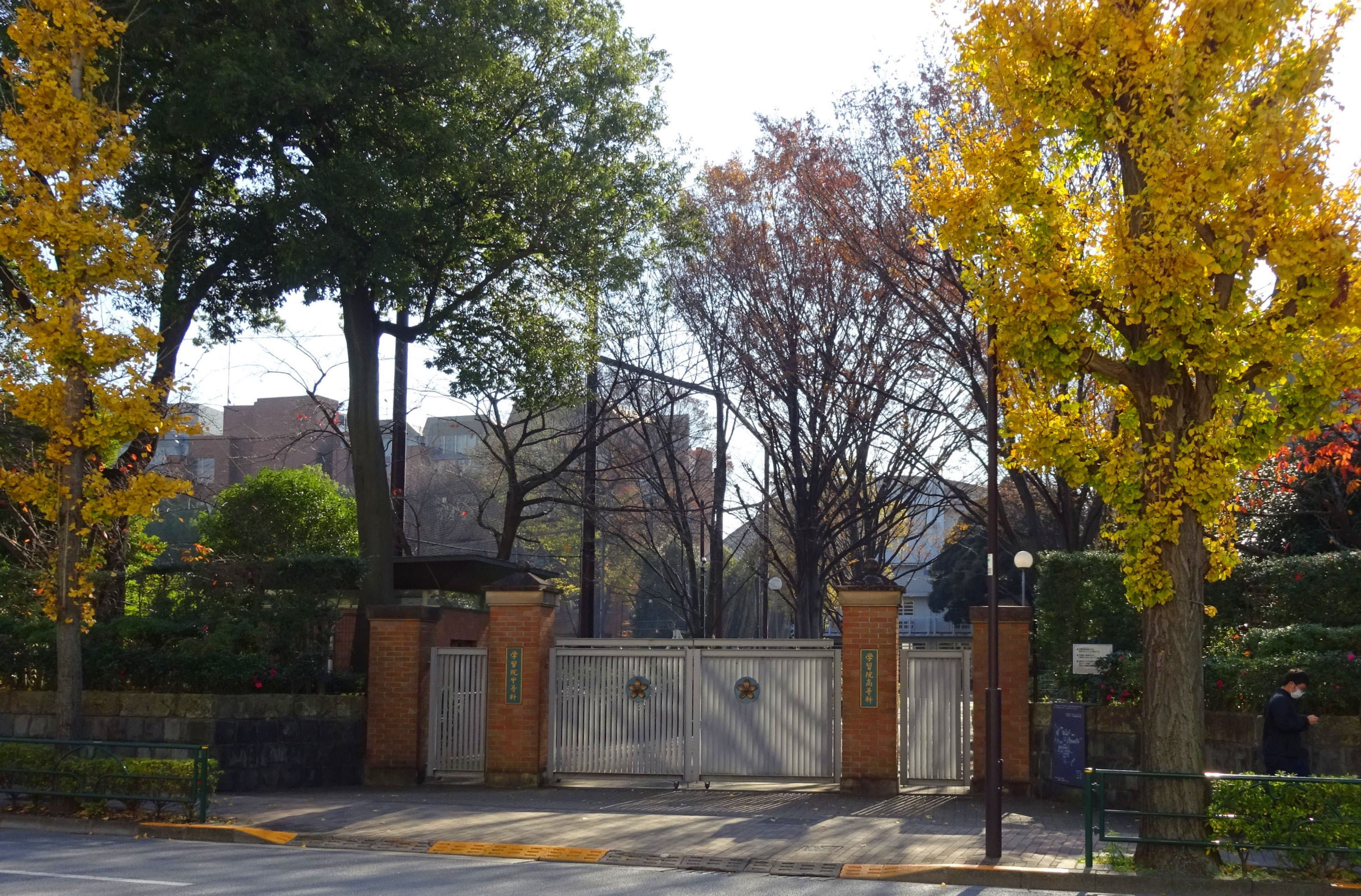
Gakushuin Boys' Junior and Senior High School

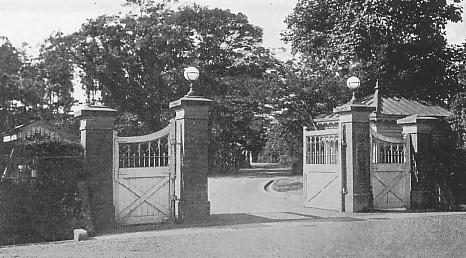
Gakushūin in 1933

The Gakushūin (学習院), or Gakushuin School Corporation (学校法人学習院, Gakkō Hōjin Gakushūin), historically known as the Peers' School, is a Japanese educational institution in Tokyo, originally established as Gakushūjo (学習所) to educate the children of Japan's nobility. The original school expanded from its original mandate of educating the social elite and has since become a network of institutions which encompasses preschool through tertiary-level education.

== History ==
The Peers' School was founded in 1847 by Emperor Ninkō in Kyoto and placed under the administration of the Imperial Household Agency. Its purpose was to educate the children of the Imperial aristocracy (kazoku). Prior to the disestablishment of the Peerage in 1947, commoners had restricted access to Gakushuin, with limited slots only to the Elementary School and Middle School.

In 1947, with the American-mandated disestablishment of the peerage system, enrollment in Gakushuin was fully opened to the general public. At the same time, administration of the school was transferred to the Ministry of Education.

=== Precepts ===
Emperor Ninko had four maxims inscribed on the walls of the Gakushūin building, including

1. Walk in the paths trodden by the feet of the great sages.
2. Revere the righteous canons of the empire.
3. He that has not learned the sacred doctrines, how can he govern himself?
4. He that is ignorant of the classics, how can he regulate his own conduct?

The school was moved to Tokyo in 1877. Its new purpose was to educate the children of the modern aristocracy. Members of the Imperial Family continue to study at Gakushūin.

=== Timeline ===
- 1847: founded as Peers' School.
- 1877: the school was established in Tokyo.
- 1884: Gakushūin became an Imperial institution.
- 1885: Peeresses' School was created.
- 1947: Gakushūin became a private institution.

== Gakushuin Corporation ==
The present-day Gakushuin School Corporation comprises the following institutions:

- Gakushuin University
- Gakushuin Women's College
- Gakushuin Boys' Junior and Senior High School
- Gakushuin Girls' Junior and Senior High School
- Gakushuin Primary School
- Gakushuin Kindergarten

== Presidents ==
No.	Name	Year	Title	Military rank	Note
1	Tachibana Taneyuki	1877–1884	Viscount	–	Last Daimyō of Miike Domain.
2	Tani Tateki	1884–1885	Viscount	Lieutenant General (IJA)	Former president of Imperial Japanese Army Academy
3	Ōtori Keisuke	1885–1887	Baron	–	Member of Privy council.
4	Miura Gorō	1887–1891	Viscount	Lieutenant General (IJA)	
5	Iwakura Tomosada	1891	Prince	–	
6	Tanaka Mitsuaki	1891–1894	Viscount	Major General (IJA)	
7	Konoe Atsumaro	1894–1903	Prince	–	The heir of Konoe family. The president of House of Peers (1892–1905)
8	Kikuchi Dairoku	1903–1904	Baron	–	Mathematician and Minister of Education (1901–1903).
9	Yamaguchi Einosuke	1905–1906	–	–	Physicist.
10	Nogi Maresuke	1906–1912	Count	General (IJA)	Emperor Showa entered school in 1908 and graduated in 1914.
11	Ōsako Naoharu	1912–1917	Viscount	General (IJA)	Emperor Showa entered school in 1908 and graduated in 1914.
12	Hōjō Tokiyuki	1917–1920	–	–	Mathematician. Former president of Tohoku Imperial University (1913–1917).
13	Ichinohe Hyoe	1920–1922	–	General (IJA)	The Inspectorate General of Military Training
14	Fukuhara Ryojirō	1922–1929	–	–	Former president of Tohoku Imperial University (1917–1919)
15	Araki Torasaburō	1929–1937	–	–	Medical scientist. Former president of Kyoto Imperial University (1915–1929)
16	Nomura Kichisaburō	1937–1939	–	Admiral (IJN)	
17	Yamanashi Katsunoshin	1939–1946	–	Admiral (IJN)	

== Notable alumni and faculty members ==
=== Teachers ===
- R. H. Blyth—taught at Gakushūin
- Kanō Jigorō—taught at Gakushūin
- Inagaki Manjirō—taught briefly at Gakushūin

=== Alumni ===
For alumni of Gakushuin University, see: Gakushūin University#Notable alumni

Imperial House of Japan

- Yoshihito, Emperor Taishō - late 123rd Emperor of Japan
- Hirohito, Emperor Shōwa - late 124th Emperor of Japan
- Nagako, Empress Kōjun, late Empress Dowager of Japan
- Emperor Akihito - Former 125th Emperor of Japan
- Emperor Naruhito - Current 126th Emperor of Japan
- Masahito, Prince Hitachi - brother of Emperor Akihito
- Hanako, Princess Hitachi - wife of the Prince Hitachi
- Fumihito, Prince Akishino - son of Emperor Akihito
- Kiko, Princess Akishino - wife of the Prince Akishino
- Kazuko, Princess Taka - sister of Emperor Akihito
- Shigeko, Princess Teru - sister of Emperor Akihito
- Atsuko, Princess Yori - sister of Emperor Akihito
- Takako, Princess Suga - sister of Emperor Akihito
- Sayako, Princess Nori - daughter of Emperor Akihito
- Nobuhito, Prince Takamatsu - brother of Emperor Shōwa
- Kikuko, Princess Takamatsu - wife of the Prince Takamatsu
- Yasuhito, Prince Chichibu - brother of Emperor Shōwa
- Takahito, Prince Mikasa - brother of Emperor Shōwa
- Yuriko, Princess Mikasa - wife of the Prince Mikasa
- Prince Tomohito of Mikasa - son of the Prince Mikasa
- Princess Yasuko of Mikasa - daughter of the Prince Mikasa
- Princess Masako of Mikasa - daughter of the Prince Mikasa
- Princess Akiko of Mikasa - daughter of Prince Tomohito
- Princess Yōko of Mikasa - daughter of Prince Tomohito
- Norihito, Prince Takamado - son of the Prince Mikasa
- Princess Tsuguko of Takamado - daughter of the Prince Takamado
- Princess Noriko of Takamado - daughter of the Prince Takamado
- Princess Ayako of Takamado - daughter of the Prince Takamado
- Yoshihito, Prince Katsura - son of Prince Mikasa
- Aiko, Princess Toshi - daughter of Emperor Naruhito

Imperial House of Yi (Korea)

- Imperial Prince Ui Min
- Prince Yi Geon
- Princess Yi Deokhye
- Prince Yi U
- Prince Yi Gu

Others

- Huisheng Aisin-Gioro, Qing Princess, Niece of Puyi
- Kuniko Asagi
- Tarō Asō, former Prime Minister of Japan
- Yoshihiko Funazaki, Author
- Toshiyuki Hosokawa
- Yasuko Ikenobo
- Marina Inoue
- Tetsuya Kakihara
- Akiko Kamei
- Hisaoki Kamei
- Michihiko Kano
- Akiko Kobayashi
- Kiyoshi Kodama
- Yoshiki Kuroda
- Yuki Kawauchi, Runner
- Yukio Mishima, Author
- Hayao Miyazaki, Director
- Keiko Nagaoka
- Hiroyuki Namba
- Shiono Nanami, Author
- Yoko Ono
- Yoshinobu Shimamura
- Yoshiki Tanaka, Author
- Satomi Ton
- Tokugawa Tsunenari
- Mona Yamamoto
- Akira Yoshimura, Author

== In fiction ==
In the novel Spring Snow by Yukio Mishima, set in the early 1910s, the characters Kiyoaki Matsugae and Shigekuni Honda attend the school.
