= Takahito, Prince Mikasa =

Japanese prince (1915–2016)

Takahito
- Prince Mikasa
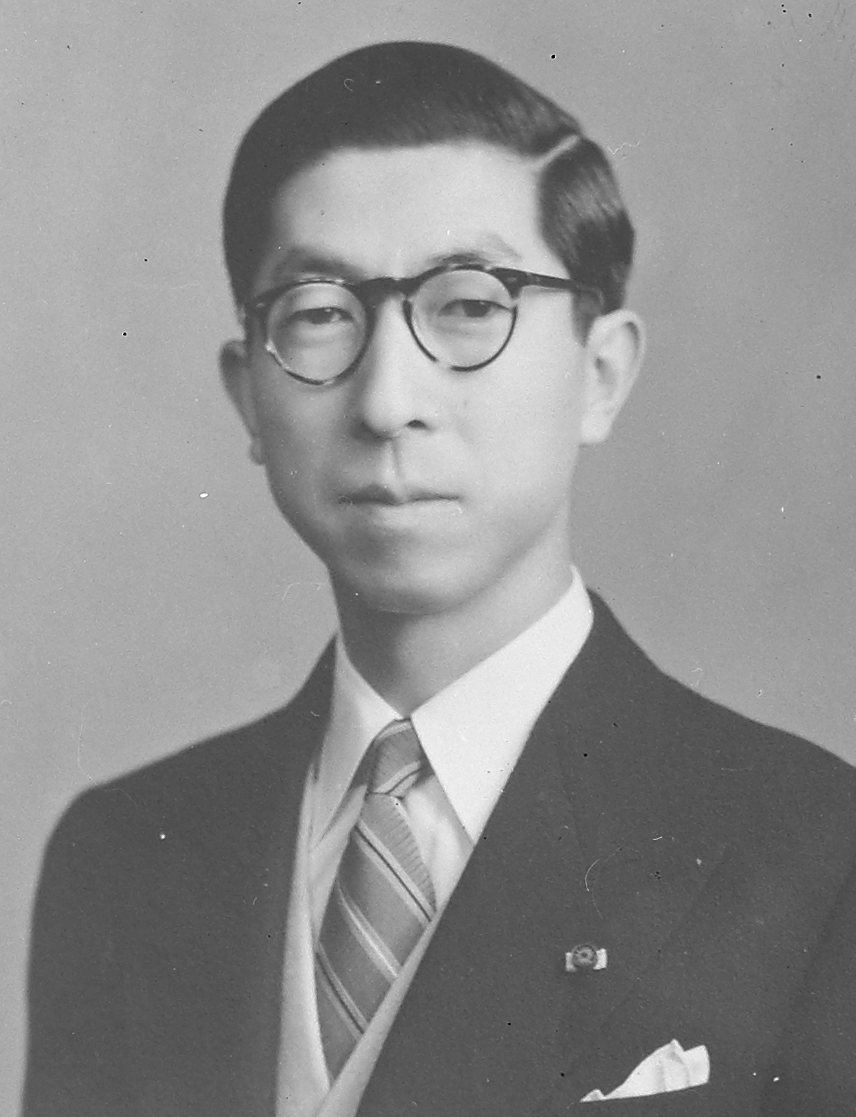
- Takahito in 1958
- Born: Takahito, Prince Sumi (澄宮崇仁親王); 2 December 1915; Tokyo Imperial Palace, Empire of Japan
- Died: 27 October 2016 (aged 100); Chūō, Tokyo, Japan
- Burial: 4 November 2016; Toshimagaoka Imperial Cemetery, Tokyo
- Spouse: Yuriko Takagi (m. 1941)
- Issue: Yasuko Konoe; Prince Tomohito of Mikasa; Yoshihito, Prince Katsura; Masako Sen; Norihito, Prince Takamado
- House: Mikasa-no-miya
- Dynasty: Imperial House of Japan
- Father: Emperor Taishō
- Mother: Empress Teimei
- Military career
- Allegiance: Empire of Japan
- Branch: Imperial Japanese Army
- Service years: 1932–1945
- Rank: Major
- Units: China Expeditionary Army; Imperial General Headquarters
- Conflicts: Second Sino-Japanese War; World War II

Takahito, Prince Mikasa (三笠宮崇仁親王, Mikasa-no-miya Takahito Shinnō; 2 December 1915 – 27 October 2016) was a Japanese prince, the youngest of the four sons of Emperor Taishō (Yoshihito) and Empress Teimei (Sadako). He was their last surviving child. His eldest brother was Emperor Shōwa (Hirohito). After serving as a junior cavalry officer in the Japanese Imperial Army during World War II, Takahito embarked upon a post-war career as a scholar and part-time lecturer in Middle Eastern studies and Semitic languages.

Prince Mikasa married Yuriko Takagi in 1941, and they had five children. Prince and Princess Mikasa outlived all three of their sons. With the death of his sister-in-law Kikuko, Princess Takamatsu, on 17 December 2004, Prince Mikasa became the oldest living member of the Imperial House of Japan. He remained active until a few months before his death at the age of 100. At the time of his death, Prince Mikasa was the oldest living royal.

== Early life ==
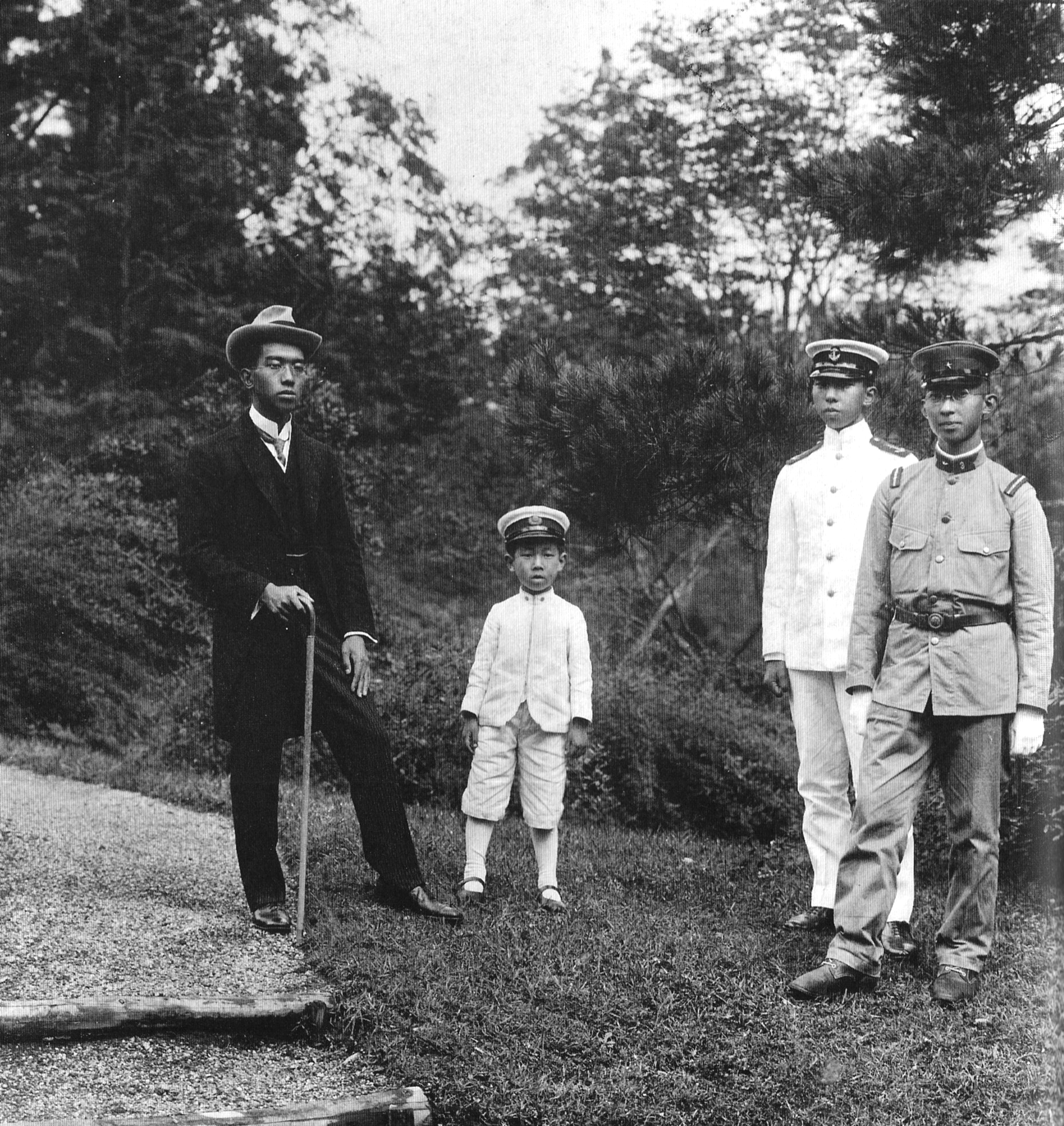
Emperor Taishō's four sons in 1921: Hirohito, Takahito, Nobuhito and Yasuhito

Prince Takahito was born at the Tokyo Imperial Palace on 2 December 1915 to Emperor Taishō and Empress Teimei. He was fourteen years younger than his eldest brother, Crown Prince Hirohito (the future Emperor Shōwa). His childhood appellation was Sumi-no-miya. Prince Takahito attended the boys' elementary and secondary departments of the Gakushūin (Peers' School) from 1922 to 1932. By the time he began his secondary schooling, his eldest brother had already ascended the Chrysanthemum Throne and his next two brothers, Prince Chichibu and Prince Takamatsu, had already embarked upon careers in the Japanese Imperial Army and the Japanese Imperial Navy respectively. Takahito enrolled in the Imperial Japanese Army Academy in 1932 and was commissioned as a sub-lieutenant and assigned to the Fifth Cavalry Regiment in June 1936. He subsequently graduated from the Army Staff College.

Upon attaining the age of majority in December 1935, Emperor Shōwa granted him the title Mikasa-no-miya (Prince Mikasa) and the authorization to form a new branch of the imperial family.

=== Military service ===
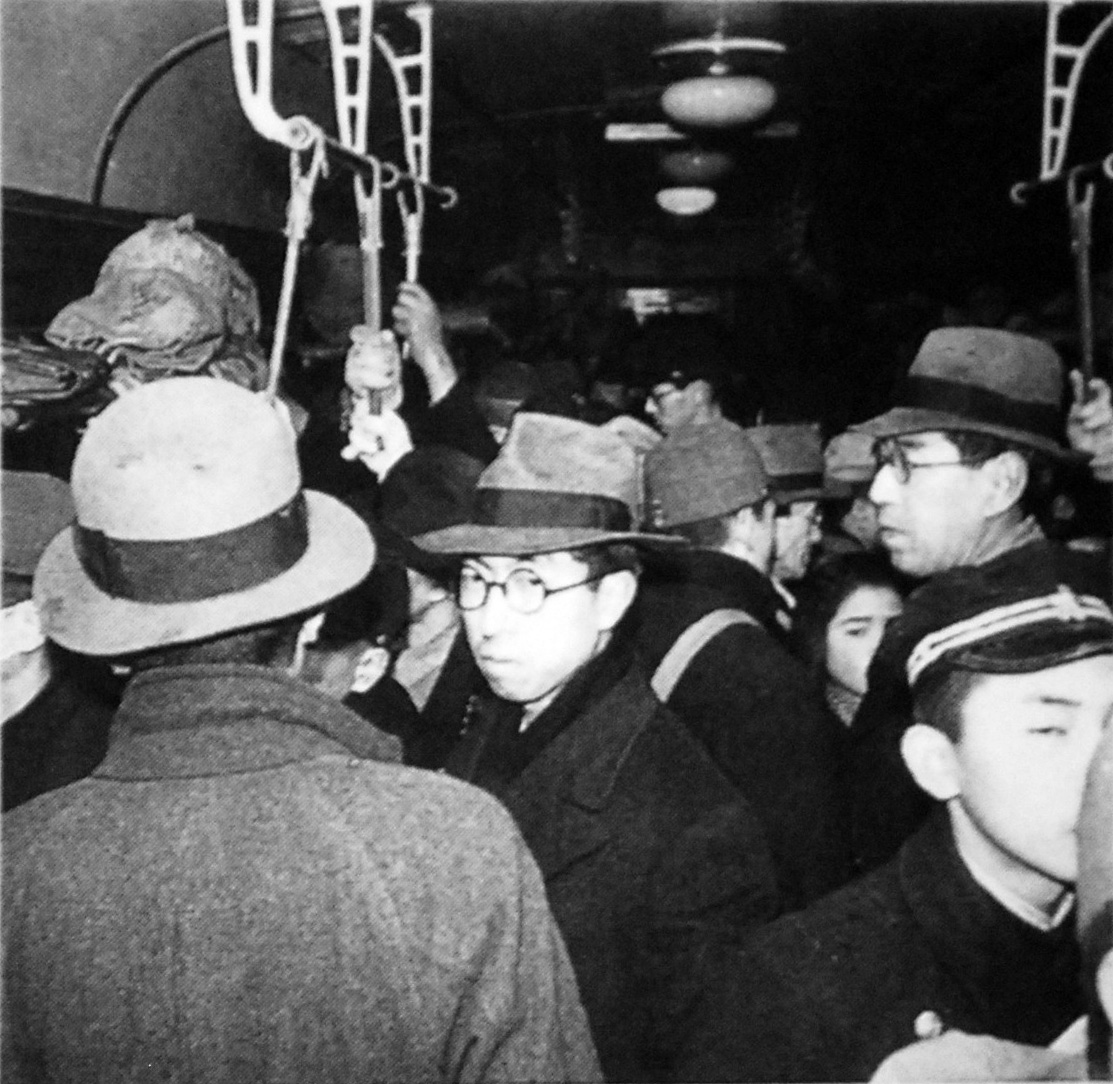
Prince Mikasa on the Yokosuka Line in 1946

Prince Mikasa was promoted to lieutenant in 1937 and to captain in 1939, serving in China under the name of "Wakasugi". During his army career, he was harshly critical of the Japanese military's conduct in China. In a 1994 interview, he criticized the Imperial Army's invasion of and atrocities in China, and recalled having been "strongly shocked" when an officer informed him that the best way to train new recruits was to use living Chinese POWs for bayonet practice. According to Daniel Barenblatt, Prince Mikasa and his cousin Prince Tsuneyoshi Takeda received a special screening by Shirō Ishii of a film showing airplanes loading germ bombs for bubonic plague dissemination over the Chinese city of Ningbo in 1940. He also was given a film of Japanese atrocities, possibly linked to the footage used in the American propaganda film, The Battle of China, and was so moved that he made his brother Emperor Hirohito watch the film.

In one of Prince Mikasa's memoirs, he wrote that he toured Unit 731's headquarters in China and was shown films showing Chinese prisoners "made to march on the plains of Manchuria for poison gas experiments on humans."

In 1994, a newspaper revealed that after Prince Mikasa's return to Tokyo, he had written a stinging indictment of the conduct of the Imperial Japanese Army in China, where the Prince had witnessed Japanese atrocities against Chinese civilians. The Imperial Army General Staff suppressed the document, but one copy survived and surfaced in 1994. After the war, it was reported that while an officer, Prince Mikasa had taken a strict stance against lax discipline and the cruel actions of Japanese soldiers serving in China.

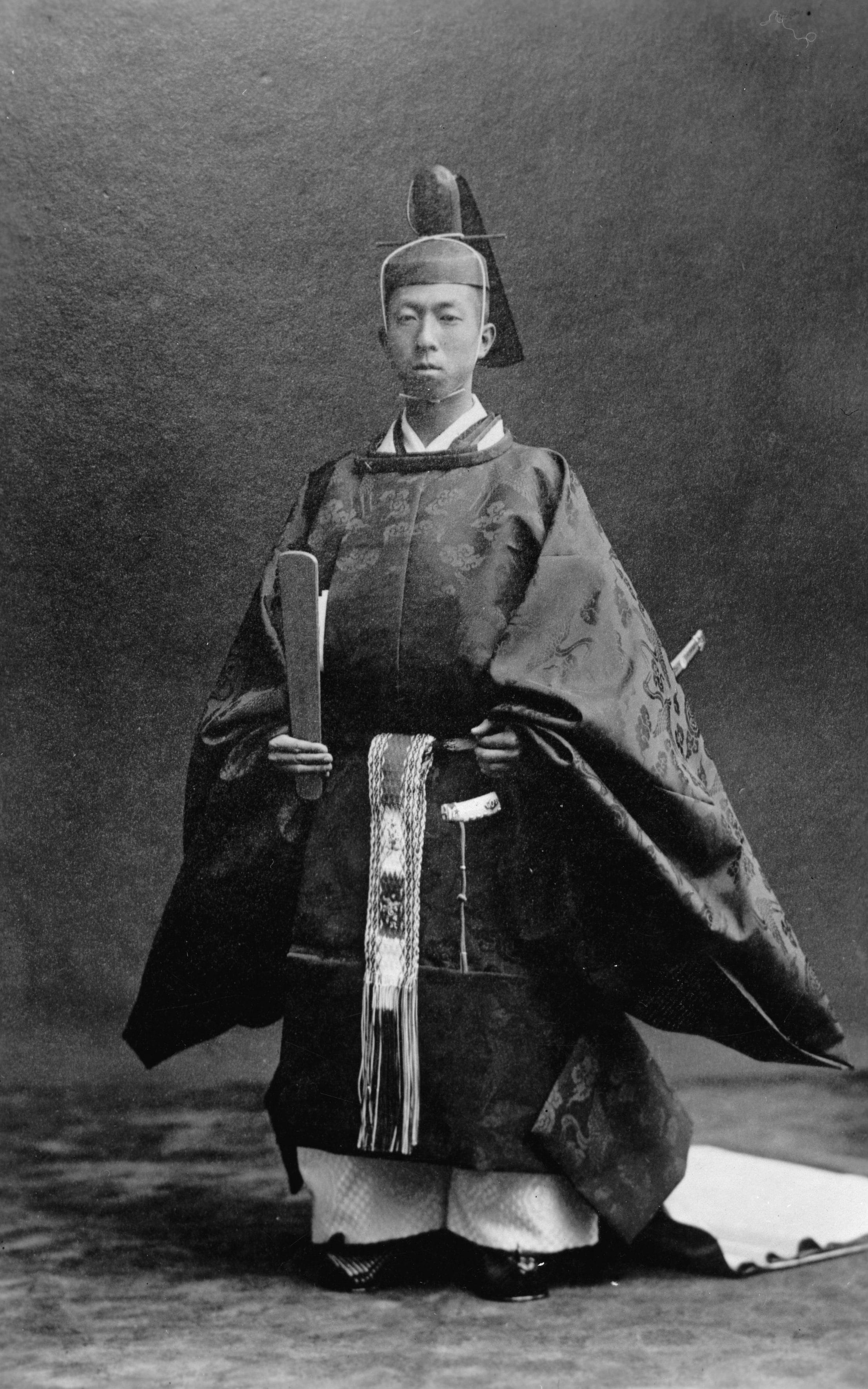
Takahito wearing the sokutai

In an interview with the Yomiuri Shimbun, Mikasa detailed the extent of Japanese military atrocities against the Chinese. He said, "I was really shocked when an officer told me that the best way to train new soldiers was to use living prisoners of war for bayonet practice because it gave them will power." "It was truly a horrible scene that can only be termed a massacre," he said. Out of a desperate desire to end the war, he wrote and delivered a speech that condemned Japanese troop aggression against the Chinese, elaborating that repeated rape, plunder and killing of civilians created strong anti-Japanese feelings in China, and that the Wang Jingwei regime in Nanjing was an attempt to cover up Japan's policy of aggression in China. He also disclosed that the Japanese served fruit contaminated with cholera germs to a team from the League of Nations that came to investigate Japan's invasion of China. They did not develop the disease. The army tried to destroy all copies of his speech, but one was discovered.

He also said he watched an army film that showed Japanese troops yelling and gassing Chinese prisoners who were tied to stakes. He stated that he did not talk about his written speech with his brother, Emperor Hirohito, but he said he once showed the emperor a Chinese-made film of Japanese atrocities.

Promoted to major in 1941, Prince Mikasa served as a staff officer in the Headquarters of the China Expeditionary Army at Nanjing, China from January 1943 to January 1944. His role was intended to bolster the legitimacy of the Wang Jingwei regime and to coordinate with Japanese Army staff towards a peace initiative, but his efforts were totally undermined by the Operation Ichi-Go campaign launched by the Imperial General Headquarters.

Prince Mikasa then served as a staff officer in the Army Section of the Imperial General Headquarters in Tokyo until Japan's surrender in August 1945.

== Marriage ==
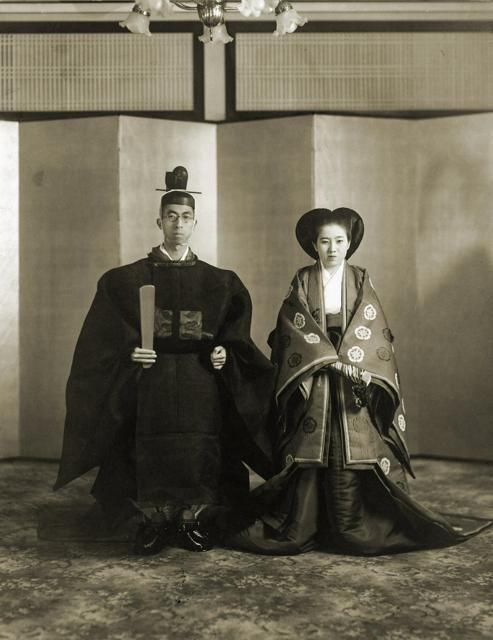
Takahito and Yuriko's wedding portrait

On 22 October 1941, Prince Mikasa married Yuriko Takagi, the second daughter of Viscount Masanari Takagi. Their wedding notably occurred less than two months before the Japanese attack on Pearl Harbor which led to the United States entering World War II. Prince and Princess Mikasa had five children. The couple's two daughters surrendered their imperial titles and left the imperial family upon marriage. All of their sons predeceased them. In addition to their five children, they had nine grandchildren and seven great-grandchildren as of 2022. Of their grandchildren, only three granddaughters remain in the imperial family as of 2024, with two other granddaughters surrendering their imperial status upon marriage.

=== Children ===
- Yasuko Konoe (近衛甯子, Konoe Yasuko), formerly Princess Yasuko of Mikasa (甯子内親王, Yasuko Naishinno), born 26 April 1944; married on 16 December 1966 to Tadateru Konoe, younger brother of former Prime Minister Morihiro Hosokawa and adopted grandson (and heir) of former Prime Minister Fumimaro Konoe. Her husband fulfilled Presidency of the Japanese Red Cross Society for over a decade; has a son, Tadahiro Konoe, who has three children.
- Prince Tomohito of Mikasa (寬仁親王, Tomohito Shinnō; 5 January 1946 – 6 June 2012); heir apparent; married on 7 November 1980 to Nobuko Asō (born 9 April 1955), third daughter of Takakichi Asō, chairman of Asō Cement Co., and his wife, Kazuko, the daughter of former Prime Minister Shigeru Yoshida; had two daughters, Princess Akiko and Princess Yōko.
- Yoshihito, Prince Katsura (桂宮宜仁親王, Katsura-no-miya Yoshihito Shinnō; 11 February 1948 – 8 June 2014); created Katsura-no-miya on 1 January 1988.
- Masako Sen (千容子, Sen Masako), formerly Princess Masako of Mikasa (容子内親王, Masako Naishinnō), born 23 October 1951; married on 14 October 1983 to Masayuki Sen, later Sōshitsu Sen XVI (born 7 June 1956), the elder son of Sōshitsu Sen XV, and currently the sixteenth hereditary grand master (iemoto) of the Urasenke Japanese tea ceremony School; and has two sons, Akifumi Kikuchi and Takafumi Sen, and a daughter, Makiko Sakata.
- Norihito, Prince Takamado (高円宮憲仁親王, Takamado-no-miya Norihito Shinnō; 29 December 1954 – 21 November 2002); created Takamado-no-miya on 1 December 1984; married on 6 December 1984 to Hisako Tottori (born 10 July 1953), eldest daughter of Shigejiro Tottori, former President of Mitsui & Co. in France; and had three daughters, Princess Tsuguko, Noriko Senge, and Ayako Moriya.

== Post-war career ==
After the defeat of Japan in World War II, many members of the imperial family, such as Princes Chichibu, Takamatsu and Higashikuni, pressed Emperor Hirohito to abdicate so that one of the Princes could serve as regent until Crown Prince Akihito came of age. On 27 February 1946, Prince Mikasa even stood up in the Privy Council and indirectly urged the Emperor to step down and accept responsibility for Japan's defeat. General of the Army Douglas MacArthur, the most senior-ranking United States military commander in Japan at the time, insisted that Emperor Hirohito retain the throne. According to Minister of Welfare Ashida's diary, "Everyone seemed to ponder Mikasa's words. Never have I seen His Majesty's face so pale."

After the war, Prince Mikasa enrolled in the Literature Faculty of the University of Tokyo and pursued advanced studies in archaeology, Middle Eastern studies, and Semitic languages. From 1954 until his death in 2016, he directed the Japanese Society for Middle East Studies. He was honorary president of the Japan Society of Orientology. The Prince held visiting and guest faculty appointments in Middle Eastern studies and archaeology at various universities in Japan and abroad, including: Tokyo National University of Fine Arts and Music, Aoyama Gakuin, Tokyo Woman's Christian University, the University of London, Hokkaido University and Shizuoka University. He made numerous radio and television appearances, speaking on cultural subjects, and was known as "the Imperial scholar". He was especially interested in Jewish studies, and believed "The truth incarnated in Judaism, a truth of being rather than of theory, is the central meaning of history. … History had brought him—Prince Mikasa—to the Jew, he said, and Judaism had brought him back to himself. For the Jew is not only the father of the West, he is the scion of the Orient. He is the holy bridge (a traditional and poignant Japanese symbol) between East and West. Through understanding Judaism, the Prince regained a sense of his dignity as a member of his people; he was again proud to be Japanese."

== Final years and death ==
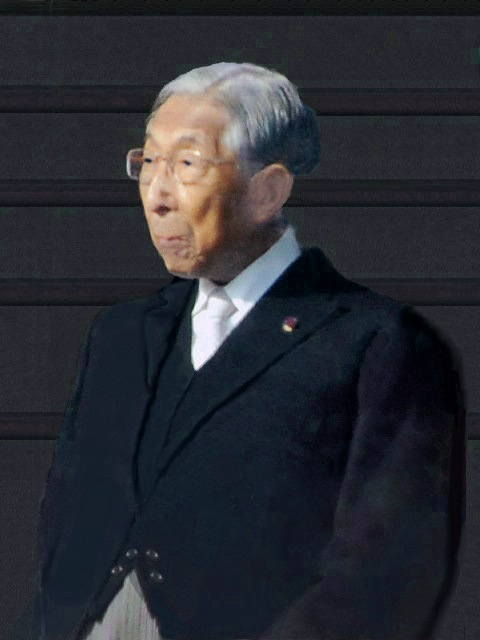
Takahito in 2012

Towards the end of his life, due to his advanced age, Prince Mikasa rarely made public appearances, and regularly used a wheelchair. He and Princess Mikasa lived together at a residence in the grounds of the Akasaka Estate in Motoakasaka, Minato, Tokyo. He underwent heart surgery in 2012, and made a full recovery. His routine included exercising for about 30 minutes each day with his wife at their Tokyo residence, and he often went outdoors for a roll in his wheelchair. About once a week, he would leave his home for a haircut, or to attend various events for other family members. In October 2014, he attended the Tokyo wedding of his granddaughter Princess Noriko, the second daughter of his youngest son Prince Takamado. Palace staff noted that he appeared vigorous until his last days, and that he would always be seen helping his wife to get about. He continued to read newspapers, and enjoyed watching sumo and music programs on television.

On 2 December 2015, Prince Mikasa became the first member of the imperial family to become a centenarian. (Note: A cousin, Higashifushimi Kunihide, was 103 at his death in 2014, but had left the imperial family in 1931 to establish a branch of the Higashifushimi-no-miya. Another cousin, Prince Naruhiko Higashikuni, lived to 102 but lost his imperial titles after World War II.) On his 100th birthday, he said, "Nothing will change just because I turn 100 years old. I'd like to spend my days pleasantly and peacefully while praying for the happiness of people around the world and thanking my wife, Yuriko, who has been supporting me for more than 70 years." At his residence in April 2016, he met the Japanese ambassador to Turkey and took a stroll at the Akasaka Detached Palace.

On 16 May 2016, Prince Mikasa was admitted to the intensive-care unit of St. Luke's International Hospital in Tokyo's Chuo Ward, having contracted acute pneumonia. He remained in hospital for the remaining months of his life. His heart weakened in June, and fluid accumulated in his lungs. Princess Yuriko frequently visited him along with other imperial family members, including the Emperor and Empress in June. During his last days, Prince Mikasa remained responsive to visitors. On 22 October, Prince Mikasa and his wife celebrated their 75th wedding anniversary in his hospital room. His condition eventually stabilised to the point where he began to receive rehabilitation in his bed, which included stretching his arms and legs. At 7:40 a.m. on 27 October, however, his heart gradually slowed, stopping at 8 a.m. Prince Mikasa was pronounced dead at 8:34 a.m., with his wife at his side. At his death, he had outlived all of his siblings and all three of his sons. Along with this, he was also the last surviving grandson of Emperor Meiji before his passing.

Prince Mikasa's funeral was held on 4 November 2016 at Toshimagaoka Imperial Cemetery. About 580 people including members of the imperial family, Prime Minister Shinzo Abe, U.S. Ambassador Caroline Kennedy, and former imperial family members, Sayako Kuroda (grandniece) and Noriko Senge (granddaughter) and their husbands, attended the funeral. Princess Mikasa hosted the ceremony as the chief mourner.

== Honours ==
=== National ===
- Grand Cordon of the Order of the Chrysanthemum

=== Foreign ===
- Brazil: Grand Cross of the Order of the Southern Cross
- Bulgaria: Commander of the Order of the Balkan Mountains
- Denmark: Knight of the Order of the Elephant
- Empire of Iran: Member 2nd Class of the Imperial Order of Pahlavi
- Empire of Iran: Recipient of the Commemorative Medal of the 2,500 year Celebration of the Persian Empire
- Italy: Knight Grand Cross of the Order of Merit of the Italian Republic
- Netherlands: Knight Grand Cross of the Order of the Crown
- Netherlands: Inauguration Medal 1980 (30 April 1980)
- Norway: Grand Cross of the Order of St. Olav
- Peru: Grand Cross of the Order of the Sun
- Sweden: Knight of the Royal Order of the Seraphim
- Turkey: Recipient of the Atatürk International Peace Prize

=== Honorary degree ===
- Ankara University

=== Honorary positions ===
- Honorary President of the Middle Eastern Culture Center in Japan
- Honorary President of the Japan – Turkey Society
- Honorary Vice-President of the Japanese Red Cross Society

== Issue ==
Name	Birth	Death	Marriage		Issue
Name	Birth	Death	Date	Spouse	Issue
Yasuko Konoe (Princess Yasuko of Mikasa)	26 April 1944 (age 82)		16 December 1966	Tadateru Konoe	Tadahiro Konoe
Prince Tomohito of Mikasa	5 January 1946	6 June 2012	7 November 1980	Nobuko Asō	Princess Akiko of Mikasa; Princess Yōko of Mikasa
Yoshihito, Prince Katsura	11 February 1948	8 June 2014	None		
Masako Sen (Princess Masako of Mikasa)	23 October 1951 (age 75)		14 October 1983	Sōshitsu Sen XVI	Akifumi Kikuchi; Makiko Sakata; Takafumi Sen
Norihito, Prince Takamado	29 December 1954	21 November 2002	6 December 1984	Hisako Tottori	Princess Tsuguko of Takamado; Noriko Senge (Princess Noriko of Takamado); Ayako Moriya (Princess Ayako of Takamado)

== Ancestry ==
Ancestors of Takahito, Prince Mikasa

8. Osahito, Emperor Kōmei (1831-1867)
4. Mutsuhito, Emperor Meiji (1852-1912)
9. Lady Yoshiko Nakayama (1836-1907)
2. Yoshihito, Emperor Taishō (1879-1926)
10. Yanagihara Mitsunaru (1818-1885)
5. Lady Yanagiwara Naruko (1859-1943)
11. Utano Hasegawa (1832-1891)
1. Takahito, Prince Mikasa
12. Regent Kujō Hisatada (1798-1871)
6. Prince Kujō Michitaka (1839-1906)
13. Lady Karahashi Meiko (1796-1881)
3. Sadako, Empress Teimei (1884-1951)
14. Noma Yorioki
7. Noma Ikuko
15. Yamokushi Kairi

=== Patrilineal descent ===
Patrilineal descent

Imperial House of Japan

1. Descent prior to Keitai is unclear to modern historians, but traditionally traced back patrilineally to Emperor Jimmu
2. Emperor Keitai, ca. 450–534
3. Emperor Kinmei, 509–571
4. Emperor Bidatsu, 538–585
5. Prince Oshisaka, ca. 556–???
6. Emperor Jomei, 593–641
7. Emperor Tenji, 626–671
8. Prince Shiki, ???–716
9. Emperor Kōnin, 709–786
10. Emperor Kanmu, 737–806
11. Emperor Saga, 786–842
12. Emperor Ninmyō, 810–850
13. Emperor Kōkō, 830–867
14. Emperor Uda, 867–931
15. Emperor Daigo, 885–930
16. Emperor Murakami, 926–967
17. Emperor En'yū, 959–991
18. Emperor Ichijō, 980–1011
19. Emperor Go-Suzaku, 1009–1045
20. Emperor Go-Sanjō, 1034–1073
21. Emperor Shirakawa, 1053–1129
22. Emperor Horikawa, 1079–1107
23. Emperor Toba, 1103–1156
24. Emperor Go-Shirakawa, 1127–1192
25. Emperor Takakura, 1161–1181
26. Emperor Go-Toba, 1180–1239
27. Emperor Tsuchimikado, 1196–1231
28. Emperor Go-Saga, 1220–1272
29. Emperor Go-Fukakusa, 1243–1304
30. Emperor Fushimi, 1265–1317
31. Emperor Go-Fushimi, 1288–1336
32. Emperor Kōgon, 1313–1364
33. Emperor Sukō, 1334–1398
34. Prince Yoshihito Fushimi, 1351–1416
35. Prince Sadafusa Fushimi, 1372–1456
36. Emperor Go-Hanazono, 1419–1471
37. Emperor Go-Tsuchimikado, 1442–1500
38. Emperor Go-Kashiwabara, 1464–1526
39. Emperor Go-Nara, 1495–1557
40. Emperor Ōgimachi, 1517–1593
41. Prince Masahito, 1552–1586
42. Emperor Go-Yōzei, 1572–1617
43. Emperor Go-Mizunoo, 1596–1680
44. Emperor Reigen, 1654–1732
45. Emperor Higashiyama, 1675–1710
46. Prince Naohito Kanin, 1704–1753
47. Prince Sukehito Kanin, 1733–1794
48. Emperor Kōkaku, 1771–1840
49. Emperor Ninkō, 1800–1846
50. Emperor Kōmei, 1831–1867
51. Emperor Meiji, 1852–1912
52. Emperor Taishō, 1879–1926
53. Takahito, Prince Mikasa
