= Noriko Senge =

Former Japanese princess (born 1988)

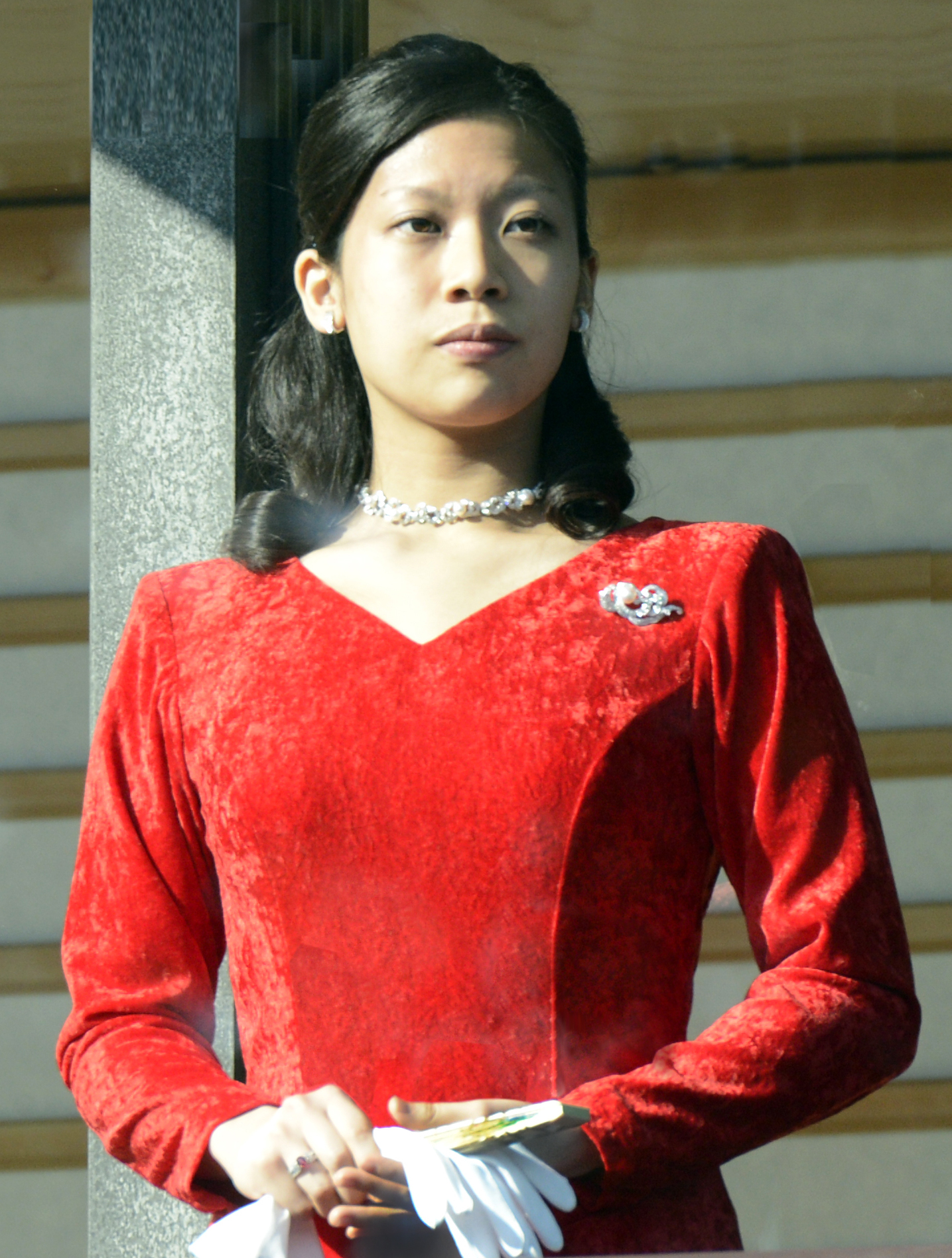
- Noriko in 2013
- Born: Princess Noriko of Takamado (典子女王); 22 July 1988 (age 38); Aiiku Hospital, Minami-Azabu, Tokyo, Japan
- Spouse: Kunimaro Senge (m. 2014)
- Parents: Norihito, Prince Takamado (father); Hisako Tottori (mother)
- Relatives: Imperial House of Japan

Noriko Senge (千家 典子, Senge Noriko; born 22 July 1988), formerly Princess Noriko of Takamado (典子女王, Noriko Joō), is a former member of the Imperial House of Japan and the second daughter of Norihito, Prince Takamado and Hisako, Princess Takamado. She married Kunimaro Senge, a commoner, on 5 October 2014. As a result, she gave up her imperial title and left the Japanese imperial family, as required by law.

== Biography ==
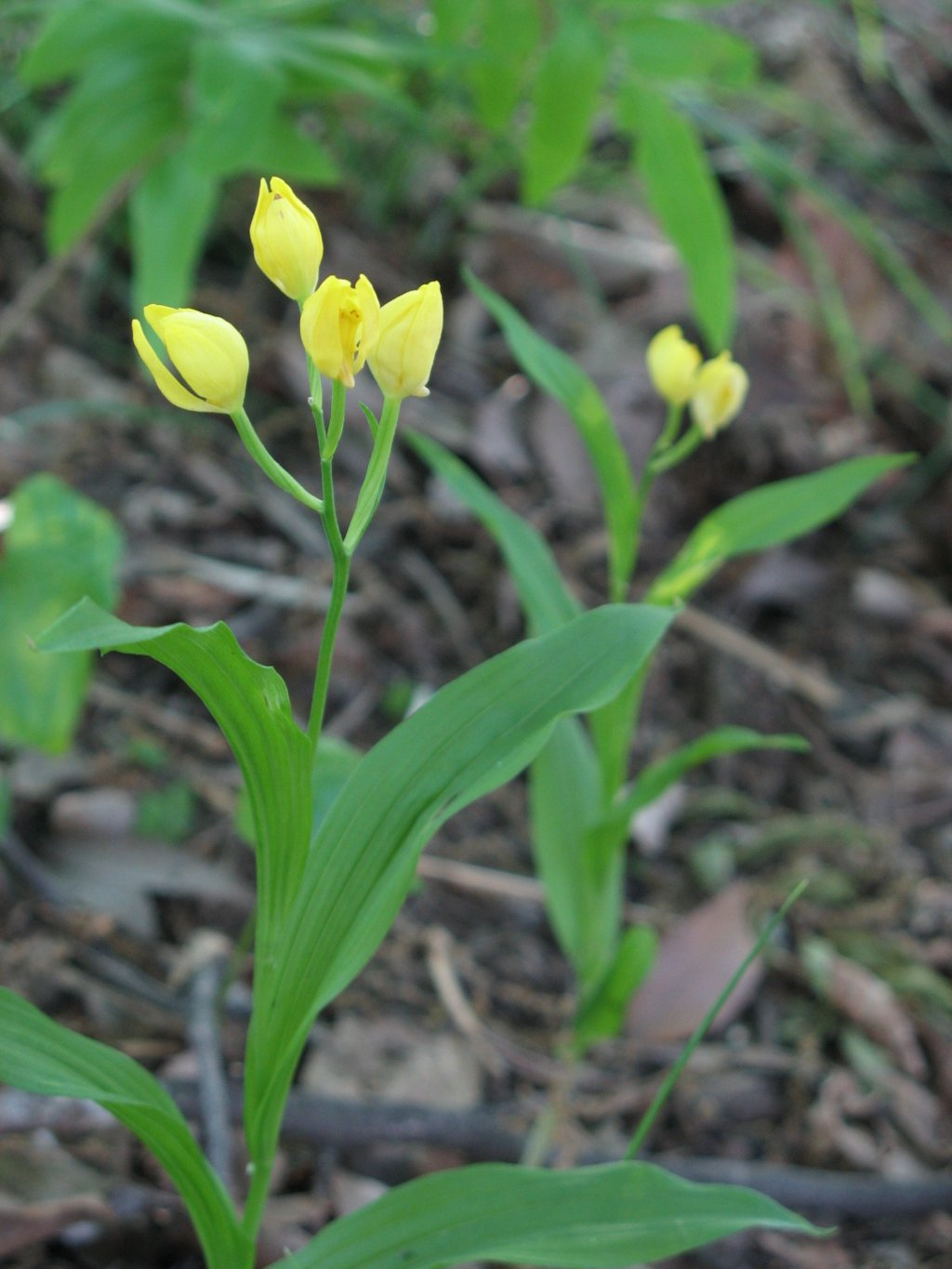
Orchids, designated imperial personal emblem of Noriko

Princess Noriko was born on 22 July 1988 at Aiiku Hospital in Minami-Azabu, Tokyo. After her birth, her father, Prince Takamado, chose her name. She went to Gakushuin Kindergarten. After that she attended the prestigious Gakushuin School for her primary, junior high, and high school education.

In April 2007, Princess Noriko enrolled in the Gakushuin University, Faculty of Letters, Department of Psychology, and expressed her intent to pursue studies in the field of clinical psychology.

In July 2008, she came of age and attended official ceremonies in Japan with the other members of the Imperial Family. She attended official functions at the palace and accompanied her mother to some other official events, as well as attending some on her own. On 20 March 2011, she graduated from Gakushuin University with the B.A. degree in Psychology.

=== Marriage ===
On 27 May 2014, Princess Noriko announced her engagement to Kunimaro Senge (千家国麿, Senge Kunimaro; born 2 September 1973), a kannushi for the Izumo-taisha shrine. The two married on 5 October at the shrine.

Senge Kunimaro is the eldest son of Senge Takamasa, the head priest of the Izumo Grand Shrine. The Senge family have been hereditary administrators of the shrine for generations. Though legally commoners today, the heads of the family held the title of baron in the Imperial Japanese peerage (kazoku) before its abolition in 1947. Senge Kunimaro is a second cousin (twice removed) of the present Emperor and a distant cousin twice over of Princess Noriko. He and Noriko are third cousins once removed by their shared descent from Prince Kujō Michitaka, who was the father of the Empress Teimei, Princess Noriko's great-grandmother and Senge Kunimaro's great-great-aunt. The couple are also fifth cousins through their shared descent from Marquis Nakayama Tadayasu, the maternal grandfather of the Meiji Emperor. By birth, Kunimaro is also related to other members of the imperial family. He is a sixth cousin once removed of his grandmother-in-law, Princess Mikasa, a third cousin twice removed of Princess Hitachi and a cousin of the late Princesses Takamatsu and Chichibu (a second cousin thrice removed and a fourth cousin thrice removed, respectively).

After the wedding, Princess Noriko lost her imperial status. This change in her status is mandated by the Imperial Household Act of 1947 that requires females of the Imperial Family to relinquish their title from birth, official membership in the Imperial Family, and allowance from the state upon marriage to a commoner. At 26 years of age, she became the seventh female member born into the Japanese Imperial Family to marry a commoner since the passage of the Imperial Household Law in 1947, and the first member of the family to lose her royal status since the marriage of Sayako, Princess Nori, Emperor Akihito's daughter, in 2005. The government decided to bestow a one-time ¥106.75 million allowance on the couple.

== Titles and styles ==
Styles of Princess Noriko of Takamado (before her marriage)
- Takamado no miya mon
- Reference style: Her Imperial Highness
- Spoken style: Your Imperial Highness

- 22 July 1988 – 5 October 2014: Her Imperial Highness Princess Noriko of Takamado
- 5 October 2014 – present: Mrs. Kunimaro Senge

== Ancestry ==
Ancestors of Noriko Senge

16. Mutsuhito, Emperor Meiji
8. Yoshihito, Emperor Taishō
17. Lady Naruko Yanagihara
4. Takahito, Prince Mikasa
18. Prince Kujō Michitaka
9. Lady Sadako Kujō
19. Noma Ikuko
2. Norihito, Prince Takamado
20. Masayoshi Takagi
10. Viscount Masanari Takagi
21. Saneko Matsudaira
5. The Hon. Yuriko Takagi
22. Tamemori Irie
11. Kuniko Irie
23. Nobuko Yanagihara
1.Princess Noriko of Takamado
12. Tamesaburo Tottori
6. Shigejiro Tottori
13. Hisashi Tottori
3. Hisako Tottori
14. Jiro Tomoda
7. Fumiko Tomoda
15. Moriko Tomoda
