= Yuriko, Princess Mikasa =

Japanese princess (1923–2024)

Yuriko
- Princess Mikasa
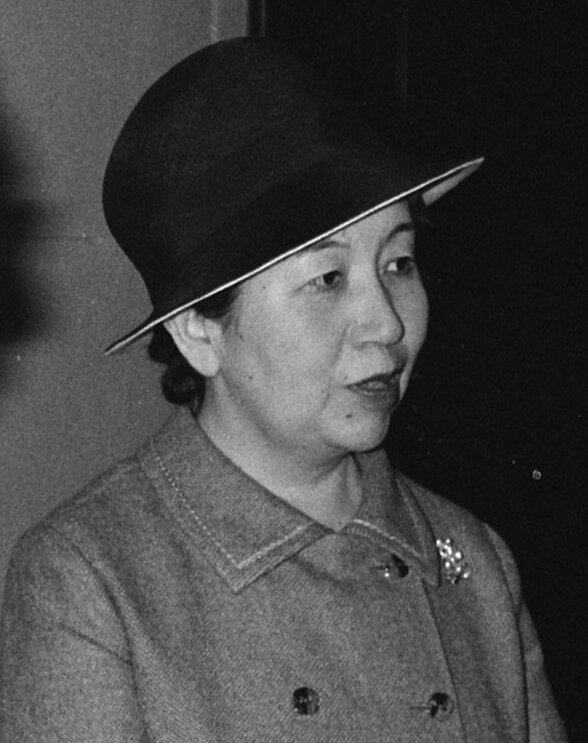
- Yuriko in 1980
- Born: Yuriko Takagi (高木百合子); 4 June 1923; Tokyo City, Empire of Japan
- Died: 15 November 2024 (aged 101); St. Luke's International Hospital, Chūō, Tokyo, Japan
- Burial: 26 November 2024; Toshimagaoka Imperial Cemetery, Tokyo
- Spouse: Takahito, Prince Mikasa (m. 1941; died 2016)
- Issue: Yasuko Konoe; Prince Tomohito of Mikasa; Yoshihito, Prince Katsura; Masako Sen; Norihito, Prince Takamado
- House: Imperial House of Japan (by marriage)
- Father: Masanari Takagi
- Mother: Kuniko Irie

Yuriko, Princess Mikasa (崇仁親王妃百合子, Takahito Shinnōhi Yuriko) (born Yuriko Takagi (高木百合子, Takagi Yuriko), 4 June 1923 – 15 November 2024) was a member of the Imperial House of Japan as the wife of Takahito, Prince Mikasa, the fourth son of Emperor Taishō and Empress Teimei. The Princess was the last surviving paternal great-aunt by marriage of Emperor Naruhito and, before her death, was the oldest member of the imperial family, and the final living member who was born in the Taishō era.

== Early life ==
Princess Mikasa was born as Yuriko Takagi on 4 June 1923 at Takagi's family house in Tokyo, as the second daughter of Viscount Masanari Takagi (1894–1948) and his wife, Kuniko Irie (1901–1988).

Her father was a member of the Takagi clan, formerly lords of the small feudal domain of Tan'nan; through her father, she was a great-great-granddaughter of Hotta Masayoshi, a prominent rōjū, or shōgunal minister, during the Bakumatsu period. Her mother was descended from the noble Yanagihara clan, and was a second cousin of Emperor Shōwa. The Emperor's grandmother, Lady Yanagiwara Naruko, was Kuniko's great-aunt.

Yuriko graduated from Gakushuin Women's Academy in 1941.

== Marriage ==
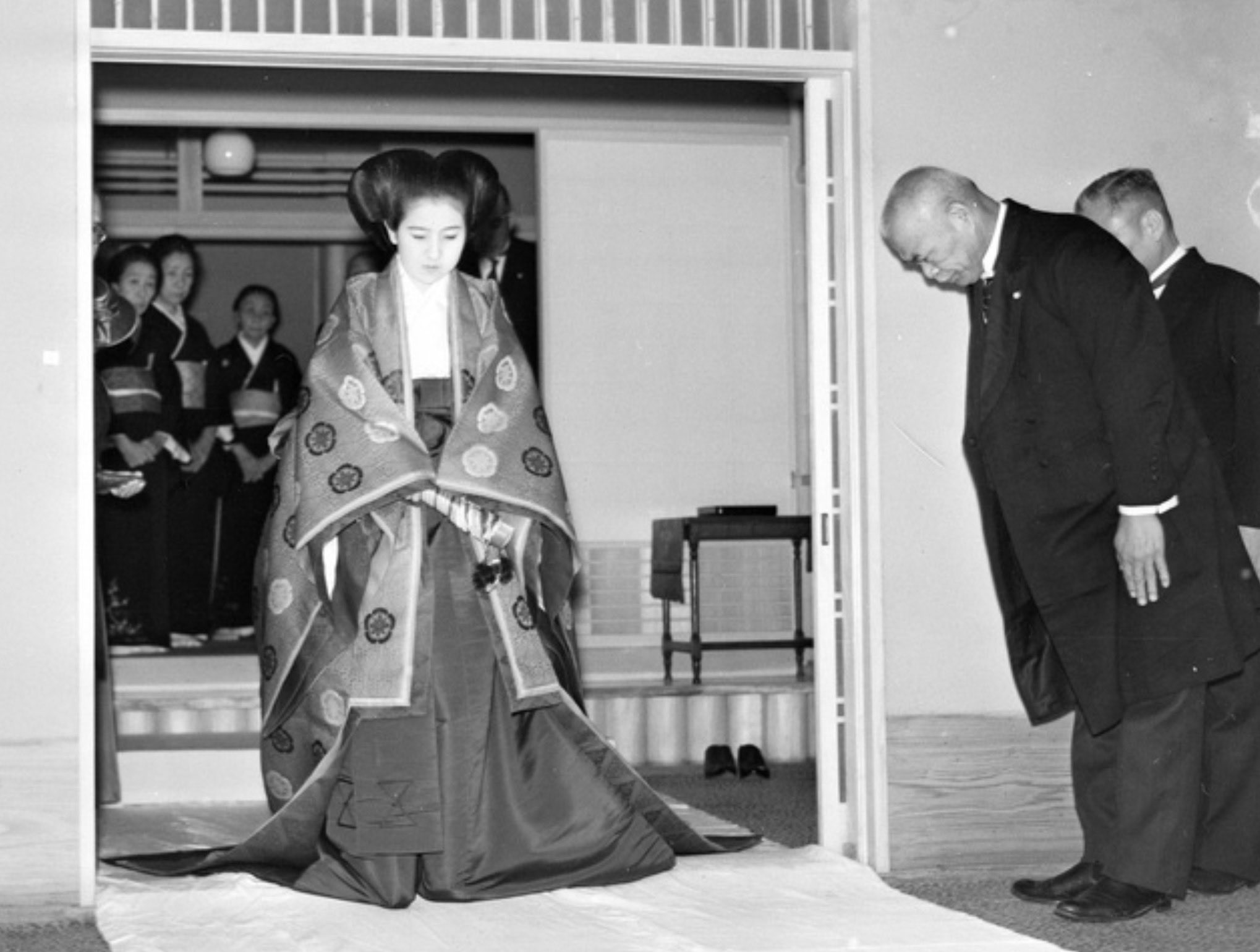
Yuriko leaving her home to marry Takahito, Prince Mikasa

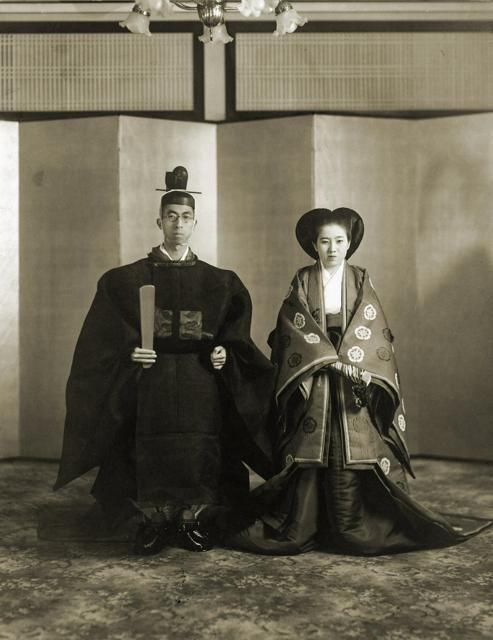
Yuriko and Takahito's wedding portrait

On 29 March 1941, Yuriko's engagement to her second cousin once removed, Takahito, Prince Mikasa, was announced. The engagement ceremony was held on 3 October 1941, and the wedding ceremony took place on 22 October 1941; this was less than two months before the Japanese attack on Pearl Harbor which led to the United States entering World War II. After her marriage, Yuriko was styled Her Imperial Highness The Princess Mikasa. Later on the couple and their first child were forced to live in a shelter after their residence was incinerated in the US fire bombings of Tokyo in 1945. Yuriko described the atmosphere during the final months of the war as "very frightening" with "heated arguments and tension, as if bullets were about to fly". She became involved with domestic duties as the family struggled financially in post-war years.

The Princess Mikasa frequently visited her husband, who was hospitalized during his final months. On 22 October 2016, they celebrated their 75th wedding anniversary in his hospital room. Prince Mikasa died five days later, with Princess Yuriko at his side. The Princess led her husband's funeral ceremony as the chief mourner.

The Prince and Princess had five children. The couple's two daughters, which are their only surviving children, left the imperial family upon marriage. All three sons predeceased them. In addition to their five children, they had nine grandchildren and seven great-grandchildren as of 2022. Of her grandchildren, only three granddaughters remain in the imperial family, with two other granddaughters losing their imperial family status upon marriage.

=== Children ===
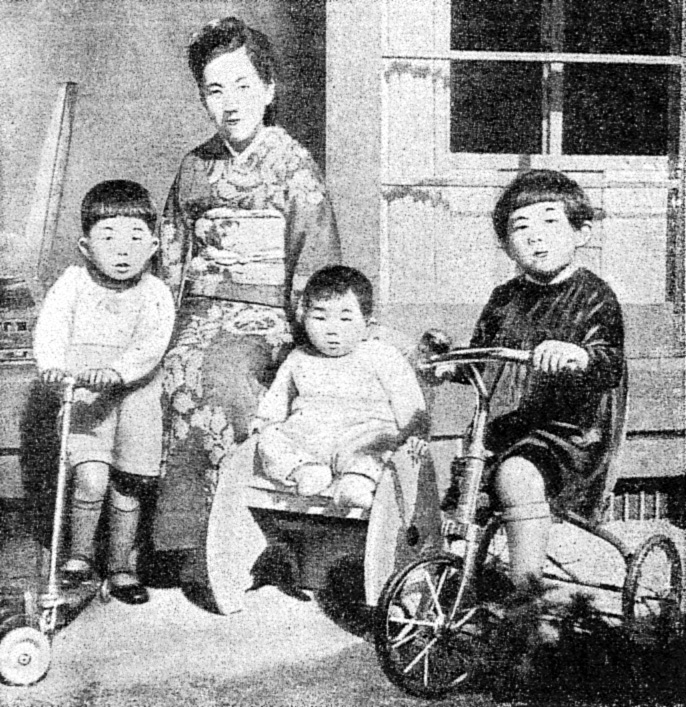
Yuriko and her three eldest children

- Yasuko Konoe (近衛甯子, Konoe Yasuko), formerly Princess Yasuko of Mikasa (甯子内親王, Yasuko Naishinno), born 26 April 1944; married on 16 December 1966 to Tadateru Konoe, younger brother of former Prime Minister Morihiro Hosokawa and adopted grandson (and heir) of former Prime Minister Fumimaro Konoe. Her husband was president of the Japanese Red Cross Society for over a decade; has a son, Tadahiro Konoe, who has three children.
- Prince Tomohito of Mikasa (寬仁親王, Tomohito Shinnō; 5 January 1946 – 6 June 2012); heir apparent; married on 7 November 1980 to Nobuko Asō (born 9 April 1955), third daughter of Takakichi Asō, chairman of Asō Cement Co., and his wife, Kazuko, the daughter of former Prime Minister Shigeru Yoshida; had two daughters, Princess Akiko and Princess Yōko.
- Yoshihito, Prince Katsura (桂宮宜仁親王, Katsura-no-miya Yoshihito Shinnō; 11 February 1948 – 8 June 2014); created Katsura-no-miya on 1 January 1988.
- Masako Sen (千容子, Sen Masako), formerly Princess Masako of Mikasa (容子内親王, Masako Naishinnō), born 23 October 1951; married on 14 October 1983 to Masayuki Sen, later Sōshitsu Sen XVI (born 7 June 1956), the elder son of Sōshitsu Sen XV, and currently the sixteenth hereditary grand master (iemoto) of the Urasenke Japanese tea ceremony School; and has two sons, Akifumi Kikuchi and Takafumi Sen, and a daughter, Makiko Sakata.
- Norihito, Prince Takamado (高円宮憲仁親王, Takamado-no-miya Norihito Shinnō; 29 December 1954 – 21 November 2002); created Takamado-no-miya on 1 December 1984; married on 6 December 1984 to Hisako Tottori (born 10 July 1953), eldest daughter of Shigejiro Tottori, former President of Mitsui & Co. in France; and had three daughters, Princess Tsuguko, Noriko Senge, and Ayako Moriya.

== Public service ==
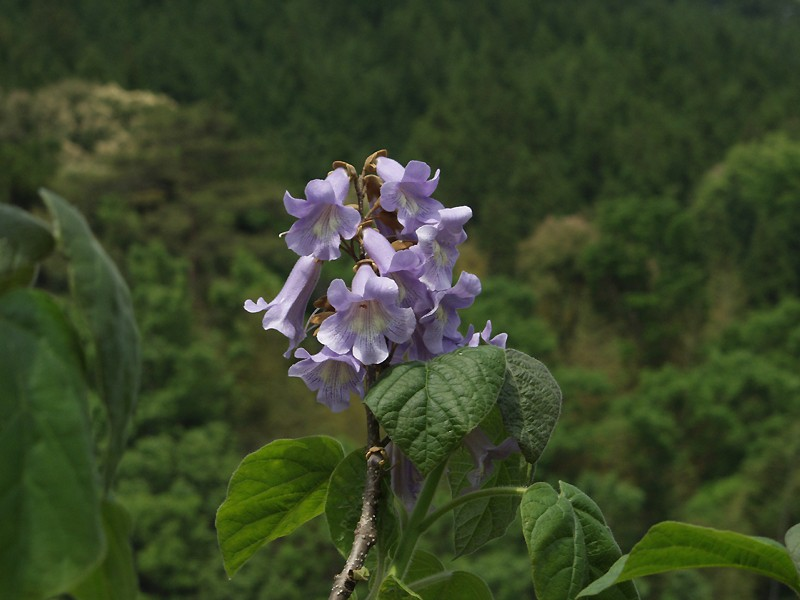
Princess tree, Paulownia tomentosa, designated imperial personal emblem of Yuriko

Princess Mikasa was the honorary president of various charitable organizations, especially those concerned with the preservation of traditional Japanese culture. She also played an active role in the Japanese Red Cross Society.

In 1948, the Princess became President of the Imperial Gift Foundation Boshi-Aiiku-kai, a position that she resigned from in September 2010. She had attended several formal occasions in Tokyo as well as other parts of Japan associated with charities concerned with mother and child health issues.

== Declining health and death ==
The princess had used a pacemaker since 1999. She underwent surgery for colon cancer in 2007. She was notably absent from the 2019 enthronement of Emperor Naruhito.

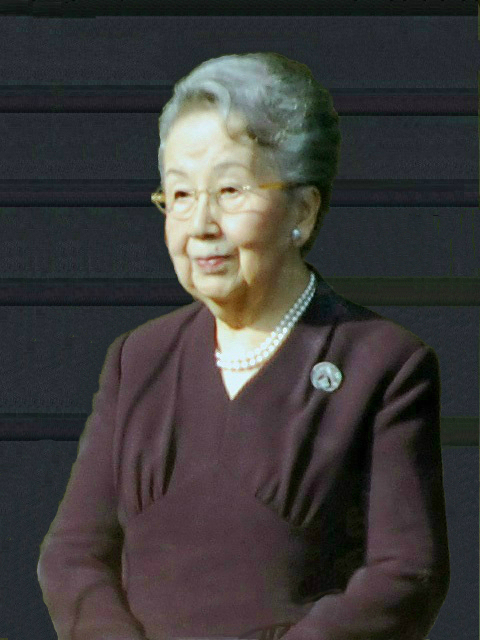
Yuriko in 2012

In September 2020, the 97-year-old was hospitalized with symptoms of heart failure and pneumonia, and was released after two weeks. She was admitted to St. Luke's International Hospital in March 2021 due to arrhythmia. It was also announced that her condition was not critical and she was discharged within a few days as her symptoms subsided. In July 2022, the princess was reported to have tested positive for COVID-19 and been hospitalized at St. Luke's International Hospital. She turned 100 on 4 June 2023.

In early March 2024, the princess was hospitalised at St. Luke's International Hospital due to a mild cerebral infarction and stroke; on 11 March, she was transferred from the intensive care unit to the general ward, as a sign that she was recovering, even if she was unable to eat, but started drinking water. On 18 March, it was announced by the Imperial Household Agency that she experienced symptoms of heart failure and cerebral infarction again, and it was difficult for her to move her right arm and leg: thus, she continued to be treated at St. Luke's International Hospital. On 25 March, it was announced that her symptoms of heart failure and cerebral infarction significantly improved (to a level close to when she was first transferred to the general ward of the hospital) and she would begin to do rehabilitation. She celebrated her 101st birthday on 4 June in the hospital, and was visited by her daughter-in-law Hisako, Princess Takamado and by her granddaughters Princess Akiko, Princess Yōko, and Princess Tsuguko. On 16 August, Yuriko was brought back to the intensive care of the hospital after being diagnosed with pneumonia; on 9 September, she returned to the general ward from the intensive care unit as her conditions improved.

An examination conducted on 7 November 2024 revealed declining overall body function, including heart and kidneys. She was doing rehabilitation, such as sitting in a wheelchair, since her admittance into the hospital in March. On 9 November, following the announcement of her declining health, she was visited by several of her immediate relatives. On 11 November, the Imperial Household Agency announced that the health of Princess Yuriko was still deteriorating. Emperor Naruhito and Empress Masako were informed of her condition, to which they expressed concern. During the same day, it was reported by the Imperial Household Agency that her consciousness was "in a reduced state", and more members of the imperial family came to visit her. On 14 November, the Imperial Household Agency's grand steward, Yasuhiko Nishimura, reported that Yuriko was losing consciousness.

On 15 November 2024, at 6:32 am (JST), Princess Mikasa died at St. Luke's International Hospital in Tokyo, aged 101. She was surrounded by her granddaughters Akiko, Yōko, and Tsuguko, as well as her daughter-in-law Princess Hisako. The Imperial Household Agency posted a statement on Instagram to announce her death, and stated that her official cause of death was "old age". Subsequently Japanese news outlets started to state her death was due to pneumonia. Yuriko's body was later taken back to Tokyo.

The imperial family entered into a mourning period due to her death. Emperor Naruhito also canceled official duties. On 16 November, her private rites were held at the Mikasa estate with all members of the imperial family in attendance. Emperor Naruhito, Empress Masako, Emperor Emeritus Akihito and Empress Emerita Michiko, who all usually do not attend farewell services, did not attend the wake, but did visit her residence to pay condolences on 24 November shortly before the wake. Her wake at her Minato Ward residence began on 24 November and concluded on 25 November, with members of the Japanese imperial family, including Crown Prince Fumihito, Crown Princess Kiko, Princess Aiko, Japanese Prime Minister Shigeru Ishiba and his cabinet in attendance. Yuriko's funeral was held at Toshimagaoka Cemetery in Tokyo's Bunkyo Ward on 26 November 2024, with 481 people in attendance. Her granddaughter Princess Akiko served as the chief mourner for both her wake and her funeral. Her body was cremated at Ochiai Funeral Hall, and her ashes were interred next to those of her husband's. The government revealed that her funeral cost ¥325 million. The national treasury is also set to return about ¥10.16 million, after half of her allowance was paid in October. "Imperial Court Expenses," which are public funds, paid for her March to November hospitalization.

== Honours ==
Mon of the Mikasa branch of the Imperial Family

=== National ===
- Grand Cordon of the Order of the Precious Crown
- Dame of the Decoration of the Red Cross
- Recipient of the Red Cross Medal

=== Foreign ===
- Empire of Iran: Member 2nd Class of the Order of the Pleiades
- Empire of Iran: Commemorative Medal of the 2500th Anniversary of the founding of the Persian Empire (14 October 1971)
- Netherlands: Inauguration Medal 1980 (30 April 1980)
- Netherlands: Knight Grand Cross of the Order of the Crown
- Ethiopian Empire: Order of the Queen of Sheba

=== Honorary positions ===
- Reserve Member of the Imperial House Council
- Honorary Vice-President of the Japanese Red Cross Society

== Issue ==
Name	Birth	Death	Marriage		Issue
Name	Birth	Death	Date	Spouse	Issue
Yasuko Konoe (Princess Yasuko of Mikasa)	26 April 1944 (age 82)		16 December 1966	Tadateru Konoe	Tadahiro Konoe
Prince Tomohito of Mikasa	5 January 1946	6 June 2012	7 November 1980	Nobuko Asō	Princess Akiko of Mikasa; Princess Yōko of Mikasa
Yoshihito, Prince Katsura	11 February 1948	8 June 2014	None		
Masako Sen (Princess Masako of Mikasa)	23 October 1951 (age 75)		14 October 1983	Sōshitsu Sen XVI	Akifumi Kikuchi; Makiko Sakata; Takafumi Sen
Norihito, Prince Takamado	29 December 1954	21 November 2002	6 December 1984	Hisako Tottori	Princess Tsuguko of Takamado; Noriko Senge (Princess Noriko of Takamado); Ayako Moriya (Princess Ayako of Takamado)
