= Yasuko Konoe =

Former Japanese princess (born 1944)

- Born: Princess Yasuko of Mikasa (甯子内親王); 26 April 1944 (age 82); Numazu Imperial Villa, Numazu, Empire of Japan
- Spouse: Tadateru Konoe (m. 1966; died 2026)
- Children: Tadahiro Konoe
- Parents: Takahito, Prince Mikasa (father); Yuriko Takagi (mother)
- Relatives: Imperial House of Japan

Yasuko Konoe (近衛 甯子, Konoe Yasuko; born 26 April 1944), formerly Princess Yasuko of Mikasa (甯子内親王, Yasuko Naishinnō), is the first child of Takahito, Prince Mikasa, and Yuriko, Princess Mikasa. She married Tadateru Konoe on 16 December 1966. As a result, she gave up her imperial title and left the Japanese imperial family, as required by law.

== Education ==
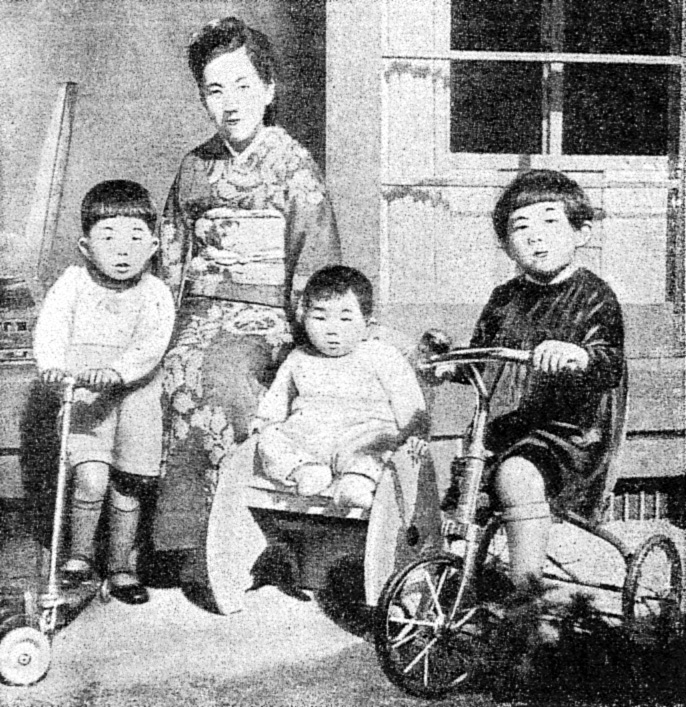
Princess Yasuko (far right) with (from left to right) her brother Prince Tomohito, her mother Princess Mikasa, and her brother Prince Yoshihito, c. 1950

Yasuko was born at Numazu Imperial Villa, Numazu, In her childhood, Konoe attended Gakushuin Elementary School and then Gakushuin Women's Secondary School. She later completed her studies by graduating from the Department of Japanese Language and Literature, Faculty of Letters, Gakushuin University.

== Marriage and family ==
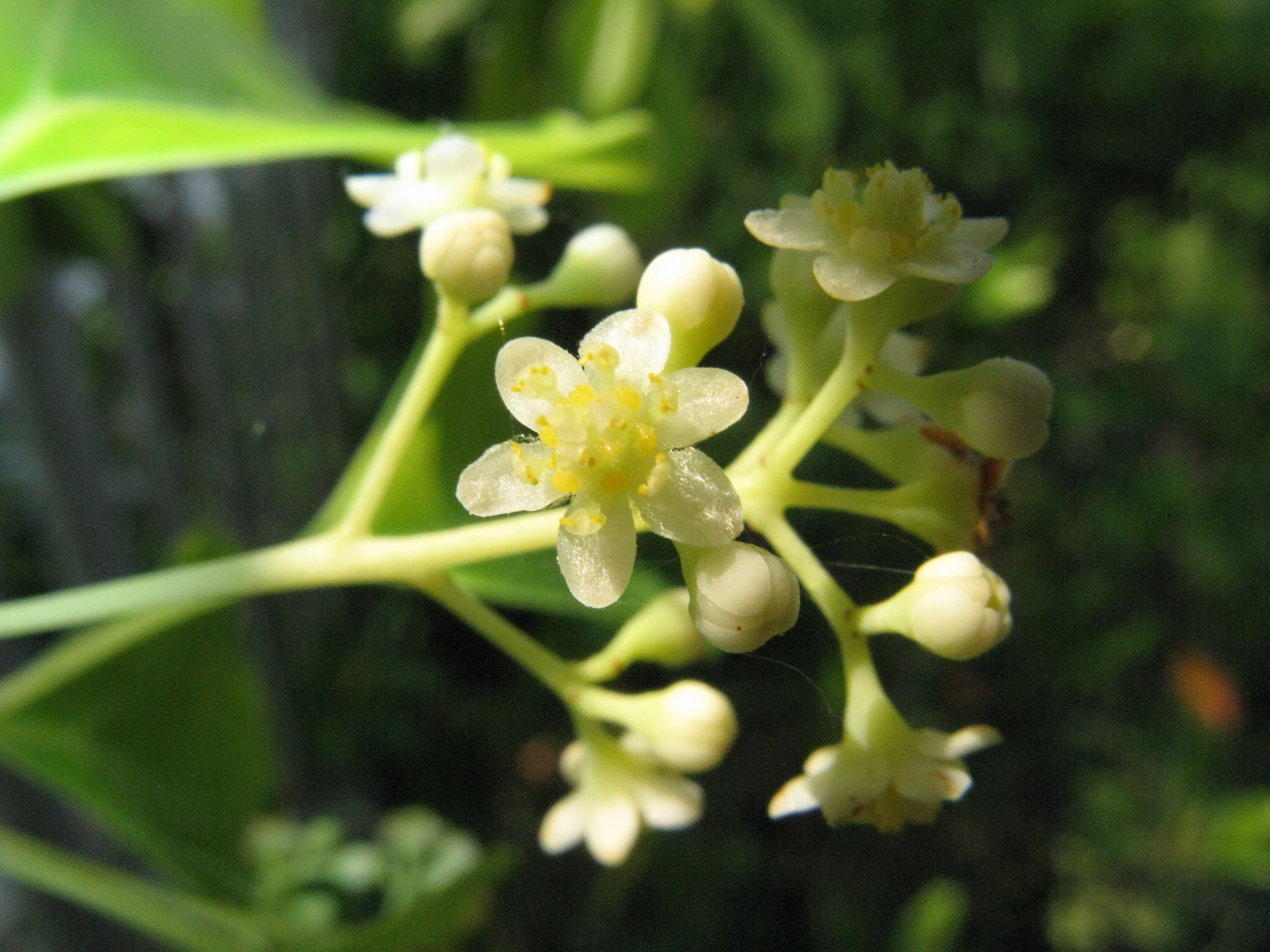
Camphor laurel, Camphora officinarum, designated imperial personal emblem of Yasuko

Princess Yasuko married Tadateru Konoe on 16 December 1966. Upon her marriage, she left the Imperial House of Japan and took the surname of her husband. Tadateru Konoe is the younger brother of former Prime Minister Morihiro Hosokawa and adopted grandson (and heir) of former Prime Minister Fumimaro Konoe. He is currently President of the Japanese Red Cross Society. They have a son named, Tadahiro (born 18 July 1970). Through Tadahiro and his wife, Keiko Kuni (m. 10 April 2004), Konoe has three grandchildren: two boys and one girl.

== Titles and styles ==
Styles of Princess Yasuko (before her marriage)
- Mikasa-no-miya mon
- Reference style: Her Imperial Highness
- Spoken style: Your Imperial Highness

- 26 April 1944 – 16 December 1966: Her Imperial Highness Princess Yasuko
- 16 December 1966 – present: Mrs. Tadateru Konoe

== Honours ==
=== National honours ===
- Grand Cordon of the Order of the Precious Crown

== Ancestry ==
Ancestors of Yasuko Konoe

8. Mutsuhito, Emperor Meiji
4. Yoshihito, Emperor Taishō
9. Lady Naruko Yanagihara
2. Takahito, Prince Mikasa
10. Prince Michitaka Kujō
5. Lady Sadako Kujō
11. Ikuko Noma
1. Princess Yasuko
12. Masayoshi Takagi
6. Masanari Takagi
13. Saneko Matsudaira
3. The Hon. Yuriko Takagi
14. Tamemori Irie
7. Kuniko Irie
15. Nobuko Yanagihara
