= Empress Teimei =

Empress of Japan from 1912 to 1926

Empress Teimei 貞明皇后
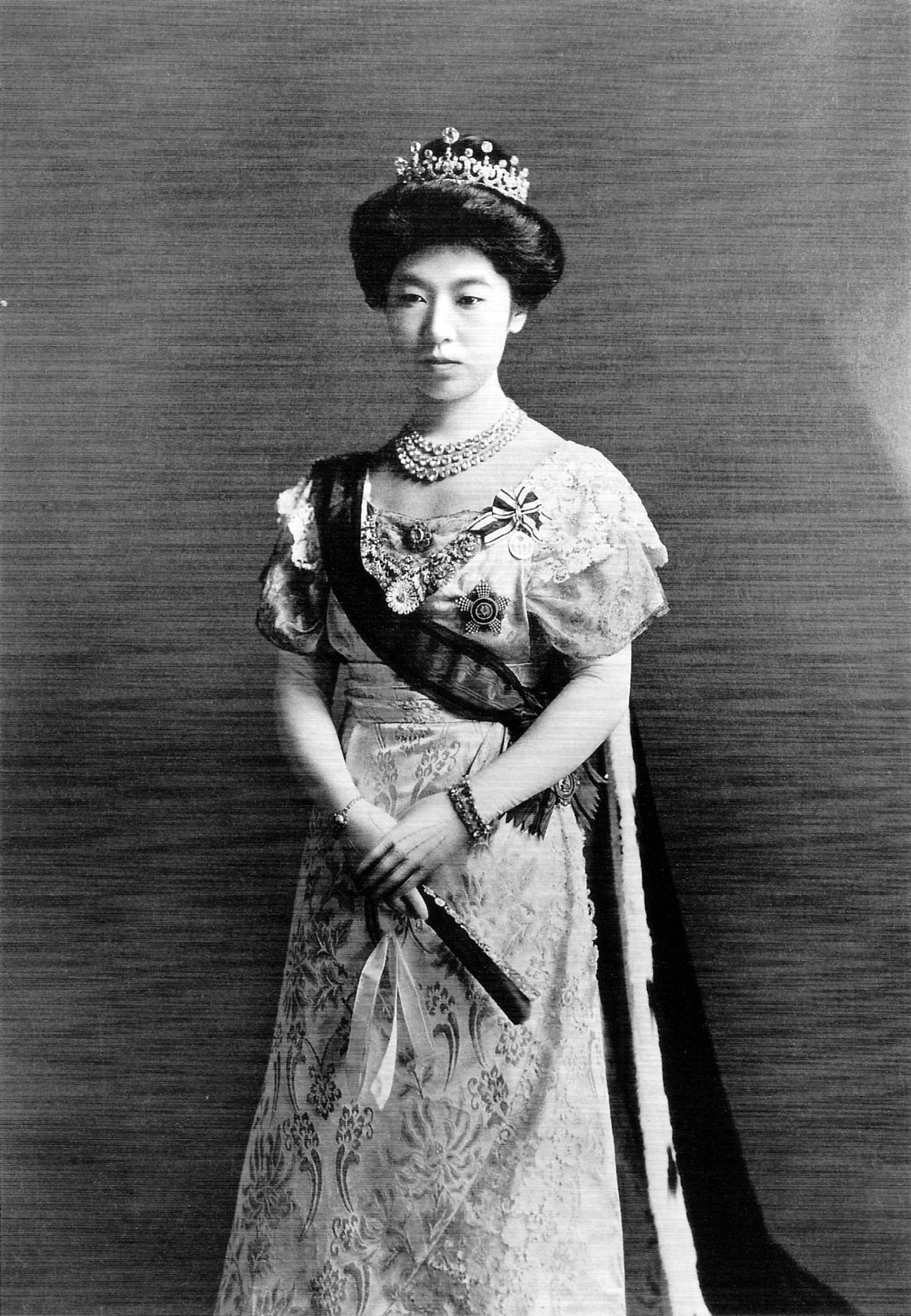
- Formal portrait, 1912

Empress consort of Japan
- Tenure: 30 July 1912 – 25 December 1926
- Enthronement: 10 November 1915

Empress dowager of Japan
- Tenure: 25 December 1926 – 17 May 1951
- Born: Sadako Kujō (九条節子); 25 June 1884; Nishikichō, Tokyo Prefecture, Japan
- Died: 17 May 1951 (aged 66); Ōmiya Palace, Minato, Tokyo, Japan
- Burial: 22 June 1951; Musashi Imperial Graveyard
- Spouse: Yoshihito, Emperor Taishō (m. 1900; died 1926)
- Issue: Hirohito, Emperor Shōwa; Yasuhito, Prince Chichibu; Nobuhito, Prince Takamatsu; Takahito, Prince Mikasa
Posthumous name
- Empress Teimei (貞明皇后)
- House: Fujiwara clan (by birth); Imperial House of Japan (by marriage)
- Father: Kujō Michitaka
- Mother: Ikuko Noma (concubine)
- Religion: Shinto and Nichiren Shōshū

Sadako Kujō (九条節子, Kujō Sadako; 25 June 1884 – 17 May 1951), posthumously honoured as Empress Teimei (貞明皇后, Teimei Kōgō), was the wife of Emperor Taishō and the mother of Emperor Shōwa. Her posthumous name, Teimei, means "enlightened constancy". She was also the paternal grandmother of Emperor Emeritus Akihito, and the paternal great-grandmother of Emperor Naruhito.

== Biography ==
Sadako Kujō was born on 25 June 1884 in Tokyo, as the fourth daughter of Duke Michitaka Kujō, head of Kujō branch of the Fujiwara clan. Her mother was Ikuko Noma (Concubinage).

She married then-Crown Prince Yoshihito (the future Emperor Taishō) on 10 May 1900, at the age of 15. The couple lived in the newly constructed Akasaka Palace in Tokyo, outside of the main Tokyo Imperial Palace complex. When she gave birth to a son, Hirohito, Prince Michi (the future Emperor Shōwa) in 1901, she was the first official wife of a Crown Prince or Emperor to have given birth to the official heir to the throne since 1750.

She became empress consort when her husband ascended to the throne on 30 July 1912 following the death of her father-in-law, Emperor Meiji. Given her husband's weak physical and mental condition, she exerted a strong influence on imperial life, and was an active patron of Japanese Red Cross Society. The relations between the Emperor and Empress of Taishō period were very good, as evidenced by Emperor Taishō's lack of interest in taking concubines, thus breaking with hundreds of years of imperial tradition, and by her giving birth to four sons.

After the death of Emperor Taishō on 25 December 1926, her title became that of Dowager Empress (皇太后, Kōtaigō). She openly objected to Japan's involvement in World War II, which might have caused conflict with her eldest son, emperor Hirohito. From 1943, she also worked behind the scenes with her third son Nobuhito, Prince Takamatsu to bring about the downfall of Prime Minister Hideki Tōjō.

She was a Buddhist adherent who had faith in Nichiren Shoshu and prayed with the Shinto ritual ceremonies of the Tokyo Imperial Palace.

She died on 17 May 1951 at Omiya Palace in Tokyo, aged 66, and was buried near her husband, Emperor Taishō, in the Tama no higashi no misasagi (多摩東陵) at the Musashi Imperial Graveyard in Tokyo.

== Honours ==
=== National ===
- Grand Cordon of the Order of Meiji
- Grand Cordon of the Order of the Precious Crown

=== Foreign ===
- Spain: The 1,060th Dame of the Royal Order of Queen Maria Luisa

== Issue ==
Name	Birth	Death	Marriage		Their children
Name	Birth	Death	Date	Spouse	Their children
Hirohito, Emperor Shōwa (Hirohito, Prince Michi)	29 April 1901	7 January 1989	26 January 1924	Princess Nagako of Kuni	Shigeko Higashikuni (Shigeko, Princess Teru); Sachiko, Princess Hisa; Kazuko Takatsukasa (Kazuko, Princess Taka); Atsuko Ikeda (Atsuko, Princess Yori); Emperor Emeritus Akihito (Akihito, Prince Tsugu); Masahito, Prince Hitachi (Masahito, Prince Yoshi); Takako Shimazu (Takako, Princess Suga)
Yasuhito, Prince Chichibu (Yasuhito, Prince Atsu)	25 June 1902	4 January 1953	28 September 1928	Setsuko Matsudaira	none
Nobuhito, Prince Takamatsu (Nobuhito, Prince Teru)	3 January 1905	3 February 1987	4 February 1930	Kikuko Tokugawa	none
Takahito, Prince Mikasa (Takahito, Prince Sumi)	2 December 1915	27 October 2016	22 October 1941	Yuriko Takagi	Yasuko Konoe (Princess Yasuko of Mikasa); Prince Tomohito of Mikasa; Yoshihito, Prince Katsura; Masako Sen (Princess Masako of Mikasa); Norihito, Prince Takamado

== Ancestry ==
Ancestors of Empress Teimei

8. Nijō Harutaka (1754–1826)
4. Kujō Hisatada (1798–1871)
9. Higuchi Nobuko (1751–1845)
2. Prince Kujō Michitaka (1839–1906)
10. Shōbai
5. Karahashi Meiko (1796–1881)
1. Empress Teimei
6. Noma Yorioki
3. Noma Ikuko
7. Yamokushi Kairi

== Gallery ==
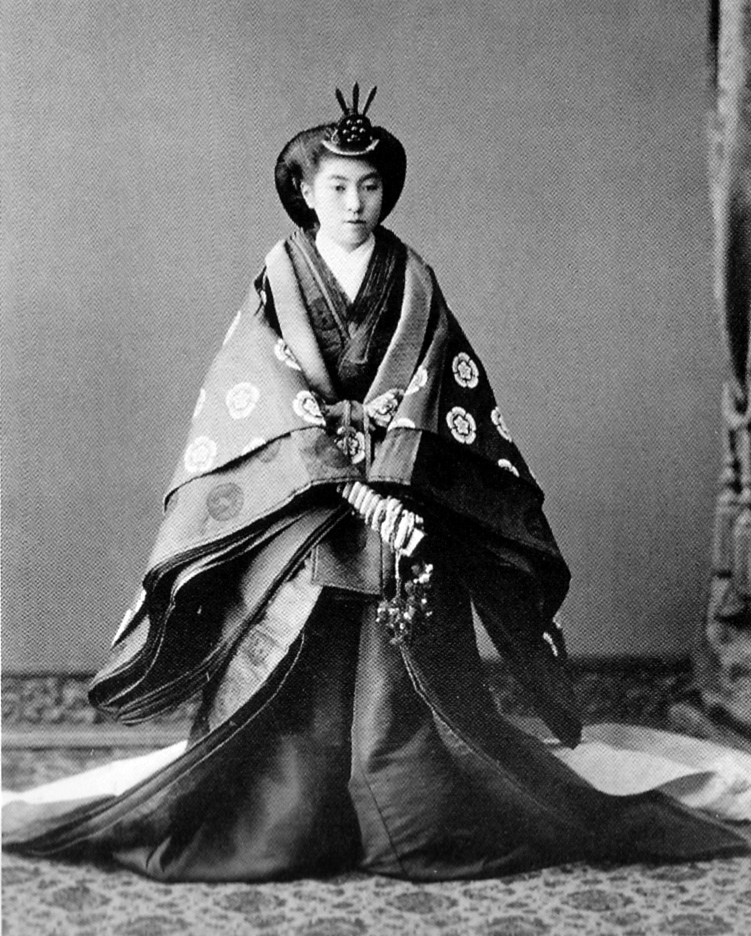
Crown Princess Sadako on her wedding day in 1900

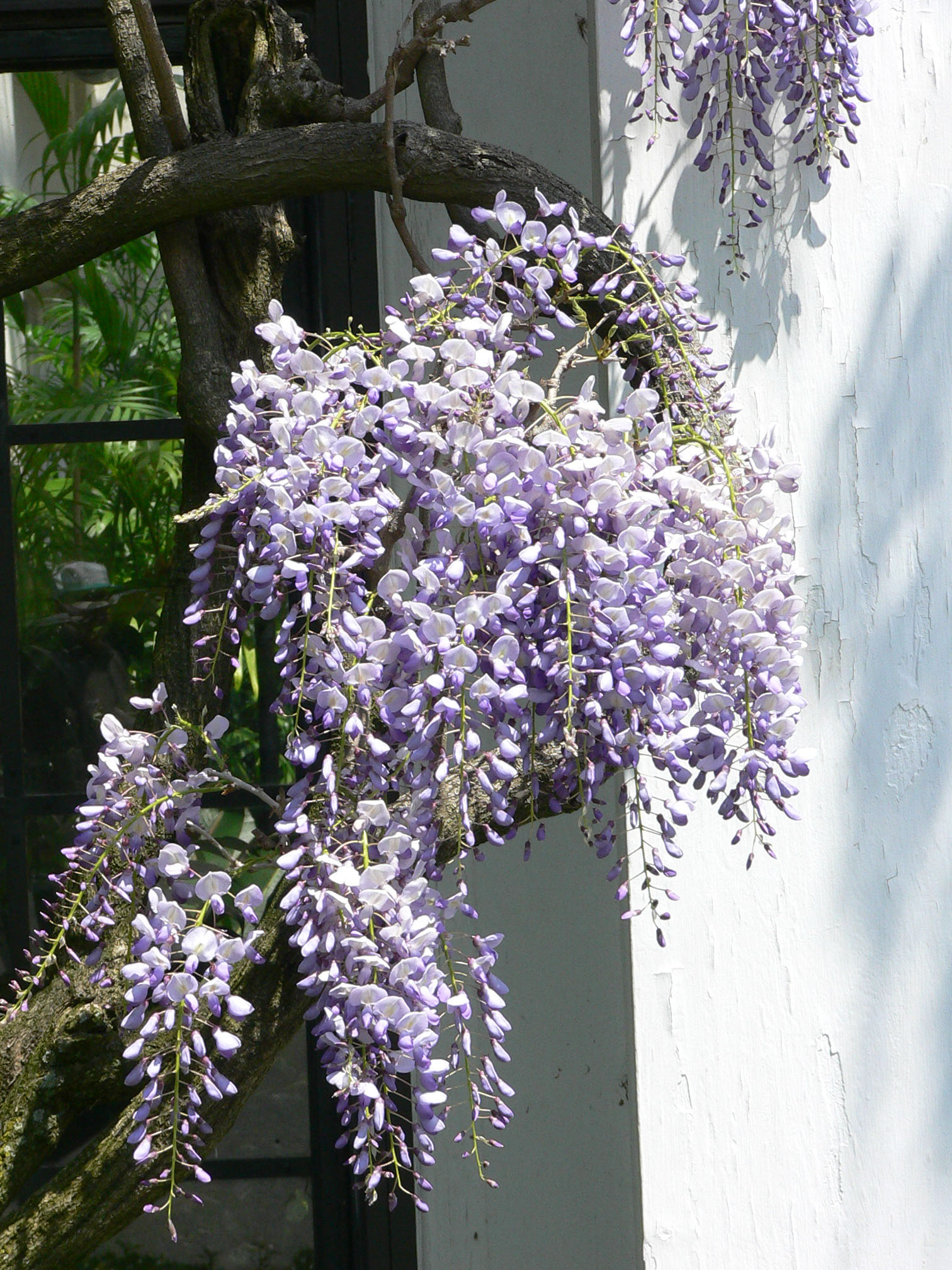
Japanese wisteria, Wisteria floribunda, designated imperial personal emblem of Sadako

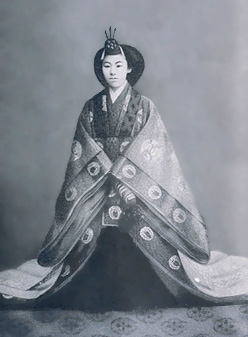
The newly enthroned Empress Sadako in jūnihitoe, 1912

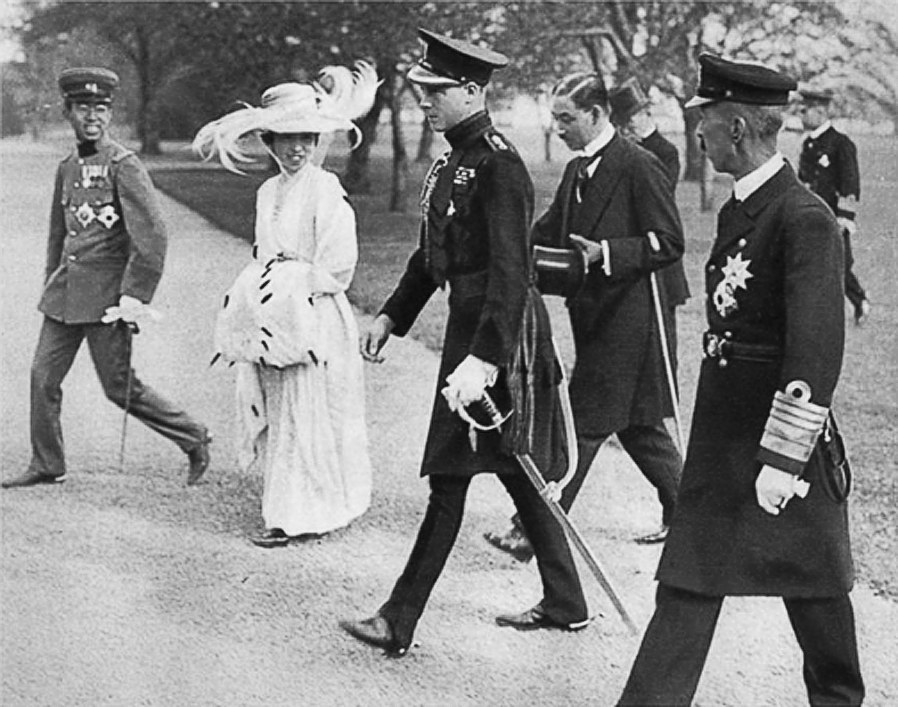
Empress Sadako participating cherry blossom viewing party with her eldest son, Crown Prince Hirohito and Edward, Prince of Wales at Shinjuku Gyo-en in 1922

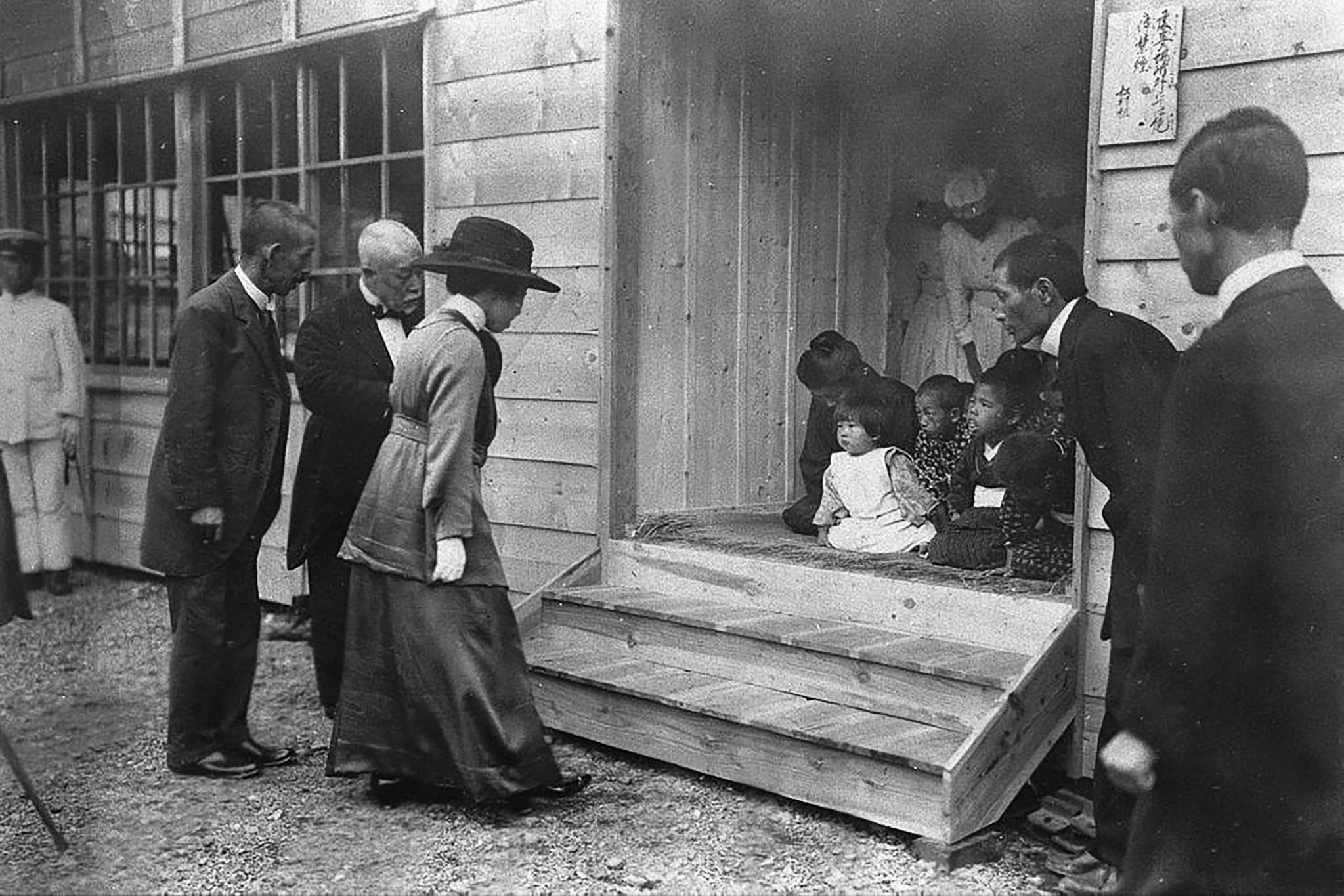
Empress Sadako visiting survivors after the 1923 Great Kantō earthquake

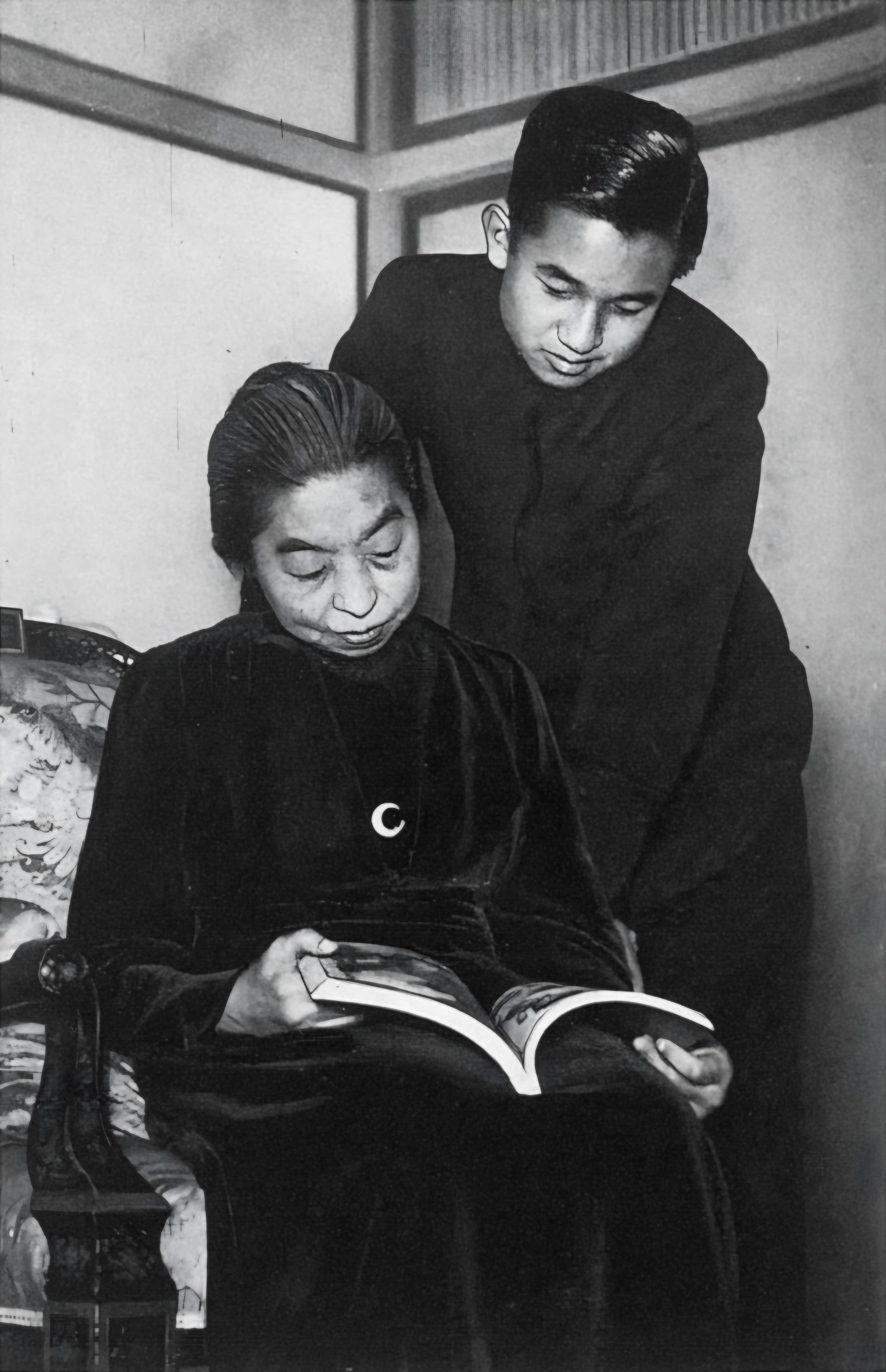
Empress Dowager Sadako with her grandson, Crown Prince Akihito in 1949

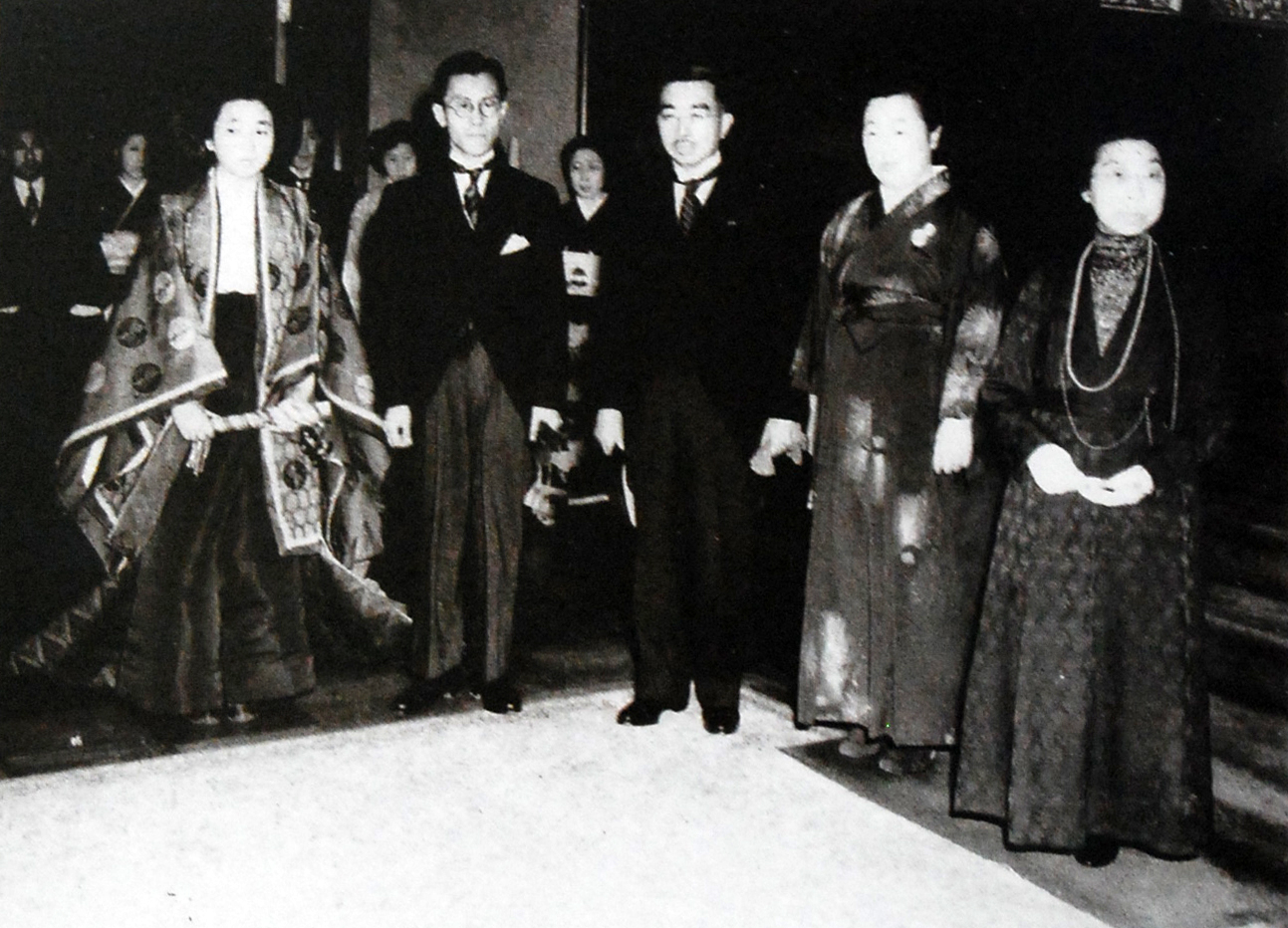
From left to right: Kazuko, Princess Taka (granddaughter), Toshimichi Takatsukasa (grandson-in-law), Emperor Hirohito (eldest son), Empress Nagako (daughter-in-law) and Empress Dowager Sadako in May 1950

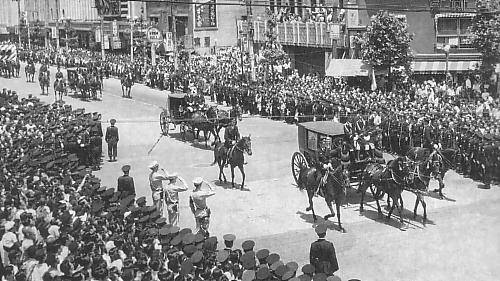
State funeral of Empress Teimei, 22 June 1951

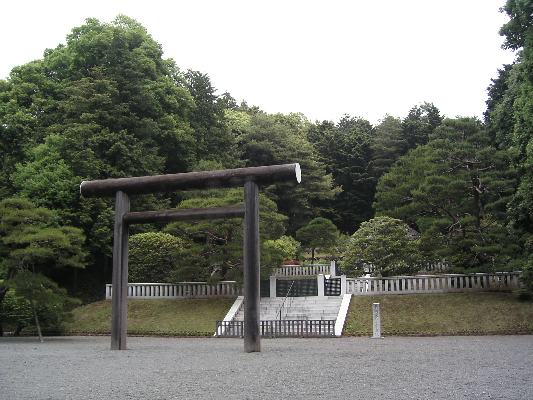
Empress Teimei's mausoleum in the Musashi Imperial Graveyard

== See also ==
- Empress of Japan
- Ōmiya Palace

== Notes ==
Empress Teimei Imperial House of Japan Born: 25 June 1884 Died: 17 May 1951
Japanese royalty
Preceded by Ichijō Masako	Empress consort of Japan; 1912–1926	Succeeded by Princess Nagako
Preceded by Ichijō Masako	Empress dowager of Japan; 1926–1951	Succeeded by Princess Nagako
