= Ōmiya Palace =

- 大宮御所

General information
- Type: Palace
- Location: Japan

Design and construction
- Known for: Residence of the Empress Dowager of Japan

Ōmiya Palace (大宮御所, Ōmiya-gosho) refers to a residence of the Empress Dowager of Japan. Literally, Ōmiya means Large Palace, but it is also a courtesy title of the Empress Dowager. Thus, the name Ōmiya Palace does not refer to any specific place, such as Ōmiya-ku, Saitama. In the modern history, there are three palaces called Ōmiya Palace:

- Kyoto Ōmiya Palace (京都大宮御所, Kyōto Ōmiya-gosho), or simply Ōmiya Palace, in Kyoto was built in 1867 as the residence of Empress Eishō, the spouse of Emperor Kōmei. The palace is now used as a lodging for the imperial family and state guests.
- Ōmiya Palace (大宮御所, Ōmiya-gosho) in Akasaka, Minato, Tokyo was the residence of Empress Teimei, the spouse of Emperor Taishō. After her death at the palace in 1951, the site of the palace was converted to the Crown Prince's residence Tōgū Palace which is now used by Emperor Naruhito and his family.
- Fukiage Ōmiya Palace (吹上大宮御所, Fukiage Ōmiya-gosho) in the Kōkyo in Tokyo was originally the residence of Emperor Shōwa and Empress Kōjun and was called Fukiage Palace. After the Emperor's death in 1989, the palace was renamed Fukiage Ōmiya Palace where the Empress Dowager lived until her death in 2000.

== See also ==
- List of palaces
- Imperial House of Japan
- Japanese empresses
