= Tadateru Konoe =

Japanese humanitarian (1939–2026)

- 近衛 忠煇
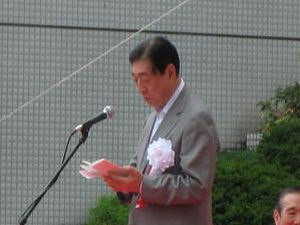
- Konoe in 2008

President of the International Federation of Red Cross and Red Crescent Societies
- In office 22 November 2009 – 6 November 2017
- Preceded by: Juan Manuel Suárez Del Toro Rivero
- Succeeded by: Francesco Rocca

President of the Japanese Red Cross
- In office April 2005 – 28 June 2019
- Preceded by: Shōichi Fujimori
- Succeeded by: Yoshiharu Otsuka

Personal details
- Born: Moriteru Hosokawa; 8 May 1939 Tokyo, Japan
- Died: 23 May 2026 (aged 87)
- Spouse: Princess Yasuko of Mikasa (m. 1966)
- Children: Tadahiro Konoe
- Relatives: Morihiro Hosokawa (brother）
- Education: Gakushuin University; Toyo Eiwa University

Tadateru Konoe (近衛 忠煇, Konoe Tadateru; 8 May 1939 – 23 May 2026) was a Japanese humanitarian who was president of the International Federation of Red Cross and Red Crescent Societies (IFRC).

Konoe was the 32nd Head of the Konoe family. President of the Japanese Red Cross Society from 2005, he dedicated his entire professional career to domestic and international Red Cross Red Crescent activities. In 2009 and again in 2013, Konoe was elected President of the IFRC, serving until he was replaced by Francesco Rocca on 6 November 2017.

== Background ==
Tadateru Konoe was born with the name Moriteru Hosokawa (細川 護煇, Hosokawa Moriteru) and his paternal ancestry can be traced back to the Japanese Imperial Family since the Hosokawa clan is a branch of Seiwa Genji, a branch of the Minamoto clan. His mother, Yoshiko (温子), was the second daughter of Fumimaro Konoe. As his maternal uncle Fumitaka Konoe (近衛文隆, Konoe Fumitaka) died childless in the Soviet Union in 1956 as a prisoner of war, Tadateru became the heir of his maternal grandfather and used his family name Konoe (近衛) instead.

The Konoe family is the most senior branch of the Fujiwara clan, a powerful noble family throughout Japanese history. The clan traces its ancestry to Fujiwara no Kamatari.

On 16 December 1966, he married Princess Yasuko of Mikasa, a first cousin of Emperor Akihito. They have a son named Tadahiro and three grandchildren. Konoe and his wife were fourth cousins once removed as both are descendants of Nabeshima Narinao (1780–1839), the 9th lord of Saga Domain; as both are descendants of the Imperial House of Japan both paternal and maternal lines, they were also more distantly related multiple times over.

Konoe was also a second cousin once removed of the Emperor Akihito, as both of them are descended from Prince Kuni Asahiko of the Kuni-no-miya imperial branch house.

Konoe died on 23 May 2026, at the age of 87.

== Academic career ==
Konoe was graduated in 1962 from Gakushuin University in Tokyo Japan. He received a B.A. degree in Political Science, after which he attended the London School of Economics in 1964 where he majored in International Relations. In 1994, he was lecturer on Micro study on International Relief Organizations at the Graduate School of Toyo Eiwa University, in Tokyo, Japan, and he was a lecturer, panelist, commentator, and speaker at various academic and other forums on topics including humanitarian aid, IHL, disasters, development, and bio-ethics.

== Japanese Red Cross Society ==
President of Japanese Red Cross Society since 2005, Tadateru Konoe has dedicated his entire professional career to domestic and international Red Cross Red Crescent activities.

Before being elected president, Mr. Konoe served his National Society for 14 years as vice president (1991-2005) and as chairman for Japanese Red Cross Academy, which offered post-graduate courses for nurses. He also held the positions of director general of the International Department (1988-1991), director general of the social department (1988), international department deputy director general (1985-1988), and international director (1976-1981) for the Japanese Red Cross Society.

== International Federation of Red Cross and Red Crescent Societies (IFRC) ==
Konoe held several posts in the IFRC. He was a member of the Standing Commission of the Red Cross Red Crescent (1995–2003) and its vice chairman (1999), member of the IFRC finance commission (1985–1993), as well as officer (1972–1975) and director (1981–1985) of the IFRC disaster preparedness bureau where he started in 1972.

== Red Cross Red Crescent Relief Missions ==
Between 1970 and 2008, Konoe was involved with over 30 Red Cross Red Crescent relief missions around the world. During his career, he was also a board member in various associations and organizations, in addition to his work with the International Red Cross and Red Crescent Movement.

== Ancestry ==
Ancestors of Tadateru Konoe

16. Hosokawa Narimori, 10th Lord of Kumamoto (1804-1860)
8. Marquess Hosokawa Morihisa (1839-1893)
17. Asano Hachi (1806-1875)
4. Marquess Hosokawa Moritatsu (1883-1970)
18. Nabeshima Naomasa, 10th Lord of Saga (1815-1871)
9. Nabeshima Hiroko (1851-1919)
19. Tokugawa Fude-hime (1830-1886)
2. Hosokawa Morisada (1912-2005)
20. Marquess Ikeda Akimasa, 10th Lord of Okayama (1836-1903)
10. Marquess Ikeda Norimasa (1866-1909)
21. Toda Akiko (1838-1906)
5. Lady Ikeda Hiroko (1889-1967)
22. Prince Kuni Asahiko (1824-1891)
11. Princess Akiko of Kuni (1870-1920)
23. Izumitei Shizue
1. Konoe Tadateru
24. Prince Konoe Tadafusa (1838–1873)
12. Prince Konoe Atsumaro (1863-1904)
25. Shimazu Mitsuko
6. Prince Fumimaro Konoe (1891-1945)
26. Maeda Yoshiyasu, 14th Lord of Kaga (1830-1874)
13. Maeda Sawako (1869-1891)
27. Kyutoku Hiroko (Maeda Teishu) (1830-1905)
3. Lady Konoe Yoshiko (1918-1940)
28. Viscount Hosokawa Yukizane, 11th Lord of Udo (1842-1902)
14. Viscount Mōri Takanori (1867-1939)
29. Matsudaira Satoko
7. Hon. Mōri Chiyoko (1896-1980)
30. Ii Naomina
15. Hon. Ii Takako (1873-1938)
31. NN
