= Masako Sen =

Former Japanese princess (born 1951)

- Born: Princess Masako of Mikasa (容子内親王); 23 October 1951 (age 74); Kamiōsaki, Shinagawa, Tokyo, Japan
- Spouse: Sōshitsu Sen XVI (m. 1983)
- Children: 3
- Parents: Takahito, Prince Mikasa (father); Yuriko Takagi (mother)
- Relatives: Imperial House of Japan

Masako Sen (千 容子, Sen Masako; born 23 October 1951), formerly Princess Masako of Mikasa (容子内親王, Masako Naishinnō), is a former member of the Imperial House of Japan. She is the fourth child and second daughter of Takahito, Prince Mikasa and Yuriko, Princess Mikasa. She is the wife of the 16th-generation Soshitsu Sen.

== Education ==
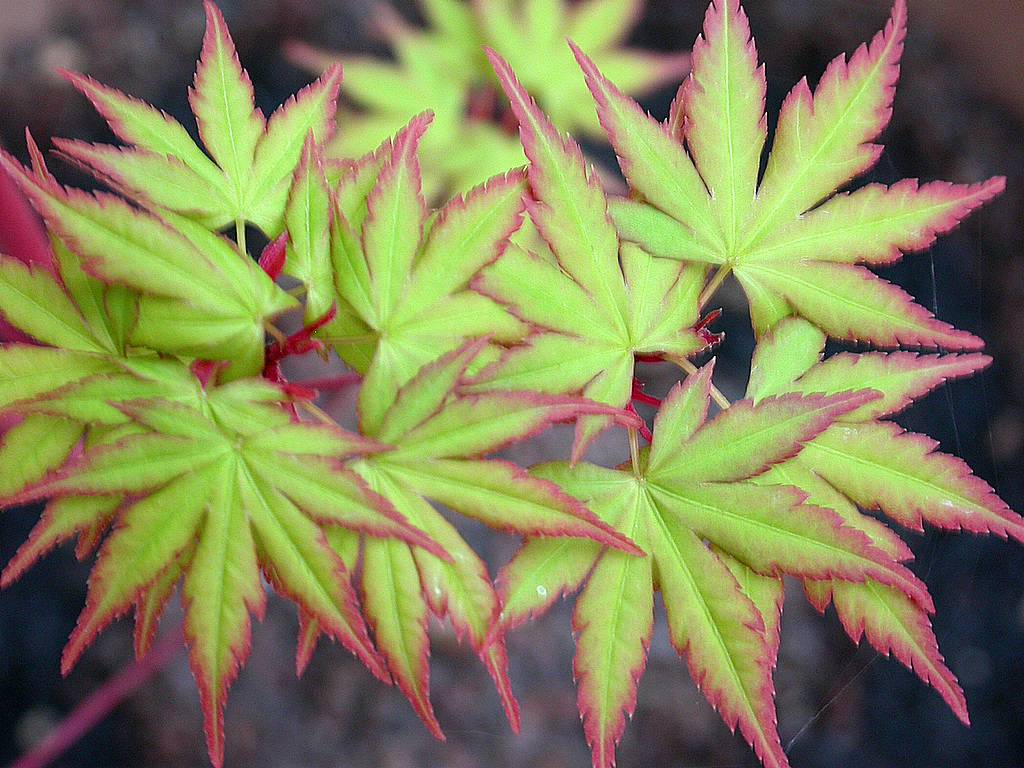
Maple (Acer) leaves, designated imperial personal emblem of Masako

For her early education as a child, Princess Masako attended Gakushuin Elementary School and then Gakushuin Women's Secondary School. She later enrolled in the Department of Japanese Language and Literature, Faculty of Letters, Gakushuin University. After completing three years, she was sent to a boarding school in Switzerland and moved to Paris for studying in the University of Sorbonne.

== Marriage and family ==
Princess Masako married Masayuki Sen (b. 1956), the elder son of Sōshitsu Sen XV, on 14 October 1983. Upon her marriage, she gave up her imperial title and left the Japanese Imperial Family as required by Imperial Law, and took the surname of her husband. He succeeded his father and thus became Sōshitsu Sen XVI, the sixteenth hereditary grand master (Iemoto) of the Urasenke Japanese Tea Ceremony School, in December 2002.

The couple have two sons and one daughter:

- Akifumi Kikuchi (10 November 1984 – 20 August 2024), had his surname officially changed from "Sen" to "Kikuchi" in 2014
- Makiko Sakata (born 11 July 1987), married in 2017 to Munehiro Sakata
- Takafumi Sen (born 6 July 1990)

== Official activities ==
Masako Sen has been active in the Soroptimist International (SI) organization in Japan. She was President of the SI Kyoto Club in 2006, and again, in 2016. In 2012, she was elected as the 14th Governor of Japan's Soroptimist International of the Americas (SIA) Chuo Region. In March, 2018, she was elected as Chair of the Soroptimist Japan Foundation.

== Titles and styles ==
Styles of Princess Masako of Mikasa (before her marriage)
- Mikasa-no-miya mon
- Reference style: Her Imperial Highness
- Spoken style: Your Imperial Highness

- 23 October 1951 – 14 October 1983: Her Imperial Highness Princess Masako
- 14 October 1983 – present: Mrs. Soshitsu Sen

== Honours ==
=== National honours ===
- Grand Cordon of the Order of the Precious Crown

== Ancestry ==
Ancestors of Masako Sen

16. Osahito, Emperor Kōmei
8. Mutsuhito, Emperor Meiji
17. Yoshiko Nakayama
4. Yoshihito, Emperor Taishō
18. Lord Mitsunaru Yanagiwara
9. Lady Naruko Yanagihara
19. Lady Utano Hasegawa
2. Takahito, Prince Mikasa
20. Hisatada Kujō
10. Prince Michitaka Kujō
21. Lady Tsuneko Karahashi
5. Lady Sadako Kujō
22. Yorioki Noma
11. Ikuko Noma
1. Princess Masako of Mikasa
24. Mamoru Takagi
12. Masayoshi Takagi
6. Masanari Takagi
26. Terutoshi Matsudaira
13. Saneko Matsudaira
27. Kazu Hotta
3. The Hon. Yuriko Takagi
28. Tametada Reizei
14. Tamemori Irie
29. Lady Ryōko Yanagihara
7. Kuniko Irie
30. Count Sakimitsu Yanagihara
15. Nobuko Yanagihara
31. Lady Hatsune Date
