= Gakushuin University =

Private university in Tokyo, Japan

Coordinates: 35°43′06″N 139°42′32″E

- 学習院大学
- Former names: Gakushūjo (学習所); pre-war English translation: Peers School
- Type: Private
- Established: 1847 in Kyoto and moved to Tokyo in 1877; reformed in 1949 as a private university
- President: Ichiro Arakawa
- Administrative staff: 279 (full time only)
- Students: approx. 8,600
- Undergraduates: approx. 8,000
- Postgraduates: under 600
- Other students: international students: about 120
- Location: Toshima, Tokyo, Japan
- Website: www.univ.gakushuin.ac.jp

Gakushūin University (学習院大学, Gakushūin Daigaku) is a private university in Mejiro, Toshima, Tokyo.

The Gakushūin ('Peers' School') was founded in 1847, and Gakushūin University was established in 1949. During the Meiji period, Gakushūin was reorganized to educate the children of the Japanese nobility, but at that time the institution had only primary and secondary education departments. The university was established after World War II as the tertiary component of the reorganised and privatised Gakushūin School Corporation.

The university is still noted for its royal connections, with most of the members of the present Imperial Family among its alumni.

== Faculties ==
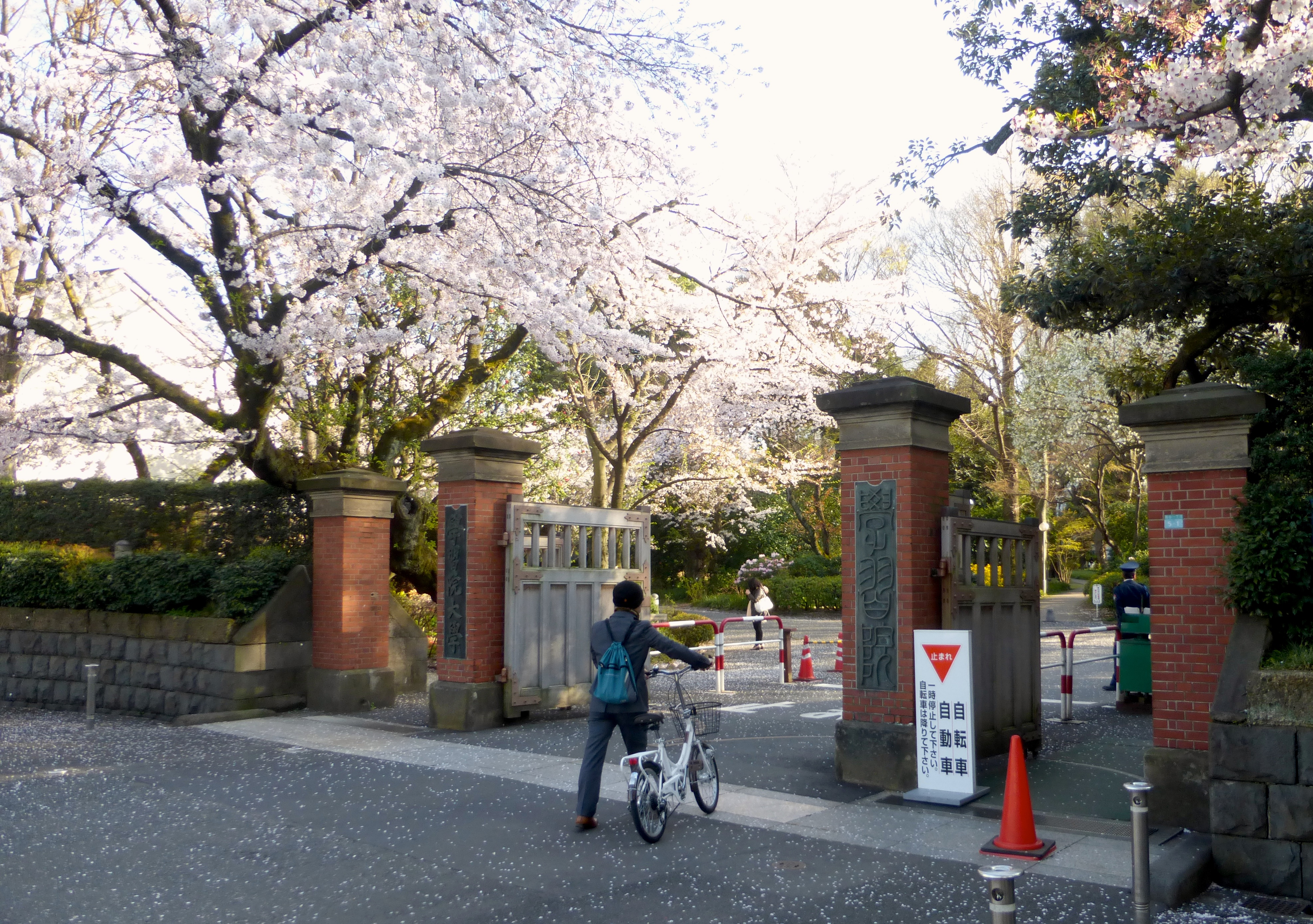
Main gates, April 2015

- Faculty of Law
- Faculty of Economics
- Faculty of International Social Sciences
- Faculty of Letters
- Faculty of Science
- Graduate School of Law
- Graduate School of Political Science
- Graduate School of Economics
- Graduate School of Business Administration
- Graduate School of Humanities
- Graduate School of Science and Technology
- Law School

The university provides a range of Japanese-language classes for foreign students. Although designed for Japanese students, approximately 60 classes are held in English, mainly in the Faculty of International Social Sciences. Each year the university admits approximately 80 foreign students (including short-term exchange students) of high academic and social standing to study in each faculty and graduate school.

== Academic rankings ==
University rankings
Global

Regional
QS Asia (Asia version)	General	161

National
- * The data of NBP is in 2009 rankings because of availability.

Program rankings
Social Sciences & Humanities

LAW

=== General rankings ===
The university was ranked 72nd in 2010 (63rd in 2009, 78th in 2008) in the Truly Strong Universities ranking issued by Toyo Keizai.

QS World University Rankings ranked Gakushuin University as 161st in Asia in 2010.

=== Research performance ===
Japanese national universities generally have higher standards of research than private universities. However, Gakushuin is one of the few private universities which competes with the top national universities. According to Quacquarelli Symonds, Gakushuin is the 6th-best research university in Japan and the 9th-best in Asia in terms of citations per paper.

Gakushuin is the highest-ranked Japanese university in the Nature Index measurement of research output quality.

=== Graduate school rankings ===
Gakushuin Law School was 24th in 2009 and 25th in 2010 in Japan on the basis of the number of its successful candidates for bar examination.

=== Alumni rankings ===
According to Yomiuri Weekly's 2008 rankings, alumni of Gakushuin have the 3rd best graduate prospectives among Japanese universities. Gakushuin was top in the rankings of the Finance and Tourism industries.

École des Mines de Paris ranked Gakushuin University as 92nd in the world in 2010 in terms of the number of alumni listed among CEOs in the 500 largest worldwide companies.

=== Popularity and selectivity ===
Gakushuin had 7.58 applicants per place (13,765/1,815) in the 2011 undergraduate admissions. Its entrance exams are also selective.

== Notable alumni ==
=== Imperial House of Japan ===
- Emperor Akihito - 125th Emperor of Japan
- Emperor Naruhito - 126th Emperor of Japan, eldest son and heir of Emperor Akihito
- Fumihito, Prince Akishino - younger son of Emperor Akihito
- Kiko, Princess Akishino - wife of the Prince Akishino
- Sayako, Princess Nori - daughter of Emperor Akihito
- Masahito, Prince Hitachi - brother of Emperor Akihito
- Atsuko, Princess Yori - sister of Emperor Akihito
- Prince Tomohito of Mikasa - son of the Prince Mikasa
- Princess Akiko of Mikasa - daughter of Prince Tomohito
- Princess Yōko of Mikasa - daughter of Prince Tomohito
- Yoshihito, Prince Katsura - son of the Prince Mikasa
- Norihito, Prince Takamado - son of the Prince Mikasa
- Princess Noriko of Takamado - daughter of the Prince Takamado
- Princess Yasuko of Mikasa - daughter of the Prince Mikasa
- Princess Masako of Mikasa - daughter of the Prince Mikasa
- Aiko, Princess Toshi - daughter of Emperor Naruhito

House of Yi

- Lieutenant General Prince Imperial Ui Min
- Prince Yi Geon of Korea
- Prince Yi Gu of Korea
- Prince Yi Kang of Korea
- Prince Yi U of Korea
- Princess Deokhye of Korea

=== Politics ===
- Tarō Asō, former Prime Minister of Japan and current Vice President of LDP
- Michihiko Kano, former Minister of Agriculture
- Yoshinobu Shimamura, former Minister and Diet Representative
- Hisaoki Kamei, Diet Representative
- Akiko Kamei, Diet Representative
- Keiko Nagaoka, Diet Representative
- Yasuko Ikenobo, former Diet Representative

=== Arts and entertainment ===
- Hayao Miyazaki, director, animator, and mangaka
- Yoko Ono, singer and songwriter
- Yukio Ozaki, Japanese-born American ceramicist
- Yukio Mishima, novelist
- Shiono Nanami, novelist
- Marina Inoue, voice actress
- Tetsuya Kakihara, voice actor
- Hiroyuki Namba, musician
- Akiko Kobayashi, singer
- Akira Yoshimura, author
- Yoshiki Tanaka, author
- Yoshihiko Funazaki, author
- Kuniko Asagi, TV presenter
- Mona Yamamoto, TV announcer
- Satomi Ton, author
- Toshiyuki Hosokawa, actor
- Kiyoshi Kodama, TV personality
- Yūka Sugai, singer, former member of Sakurazaka46
- Shunta Sono, idol, member of M!LK

=== Others ===
- Ryosuke Mizumachi, basketball player
- Yoshiki Kuroda, urban designer
- Tokugawa Tsunenari, head of Tokugawa clan
- Yuki Kawauchi, runner
