= Kuniko Asagi =

Japanese actress and television presenter

Kuniko Asagi (麻木 久仁子, Asagi Kuniko; born on November 12, 1962) is a Japanese actress and television presenter. Her real name is Kuniko Tanaka (田中 久仁子, Tanaka Kuniko).

== Early career ==
She attended Kokubunji High School in Tokyo, and Gakushuin University. Her resume includes Tokyo Disney Resort advertising, shown widely when the park opened.

== Personal life ==
Her parents divorced. She was married to Akihiko Matsumoto, a television music composer, and they have a daughter. In 2018 she released a cookbook of recipes she developed during breast cancer treatment and her subsequent study at a school of medicine.

== TV programs ==
- Waratte Iitomo
- Mecha-Mecha Iketeru!
