= Masanari Takagi =

Japanese entomologist

- 高木 正得
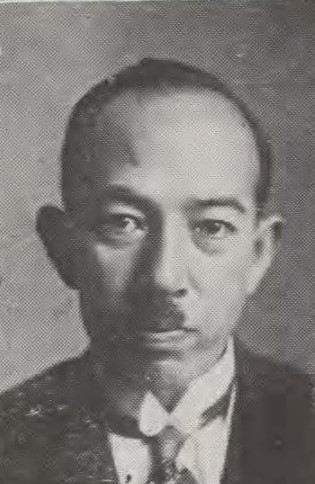
- Takagi in 1937
- Born: 20 January 1894
- Disappeared: 8 July 1948
- Died: between 8 July and 1 November 1948 (aged 54); Mount Kumotori
- Body discovered: 1 November 1948 (aged 54)
- Education: University of Tokyo
- Occupation: Member of the House of Peers
- Years active: 7 April 1932 – 2 May 1947
- Children: 4, including Yuriko, Princess Mikasa

Viscount Masanari Takagi was a Japanese entomologist, nobleman, and, in his capacity as a viscount, a politician in the House of Peers. He was the father of Yuriko, Princess Mikasa, wife of Takahito, Prince Mikasa, the youngest brother of Emperor Hirohito.

== Life ==
He was born as the heir to Masayoshi Takagi, the last lord of Tannan Domain in what is now Osaka prefecture. He inherited his father's titles upon his death in February 1920. He graduated from the University of Tokyo with a BSc in zoology in 1922. He remained at the university for his postgraduate study in entomology, particularly interested in butterflies and longhorn beetles.

He was devastated when he lost much of his collection of insect specimens and his books amidst an air raid during the Second World War. The abolition of the peerage system that followed meant he lost the privilege needed to rebuild his collection. He disappeared suddenly with potassium cyanide capsules he was keeping to collect insects on 8 July 1948. His suicide note read, 'it is utterly futile to try to find me, so pray do not try to do so; I shall just merge with nature and become part of it again'. His body was found on 1 November in the same year. The location was Mount Kumotori in Okutama, to which he had often gone to collect insects.
