= Japanese Red Cross Society =

Japanese affiliate of the International Red Cross

Japanese Red Cross 日本赤十字社 Nippon Sekijūjisha
- Abbreviation: JRCS
- Formation: May 1, 1877
- Type: Non-governmental organization
- Purpose: Humanitarian
- Headquarters: Tokyo, Japan
- Location: 1-1-3, Shiba Daimon, Minato-ku, Tokyo, Japan
- Region served: Japan
- Members: International Red Cross and Red Crescent Movement
- Official language: Japanese and English
- Honorary President: Empress Masako of Japan
- Executive President: Atsushi Seike
- Website: jrc.or.jp

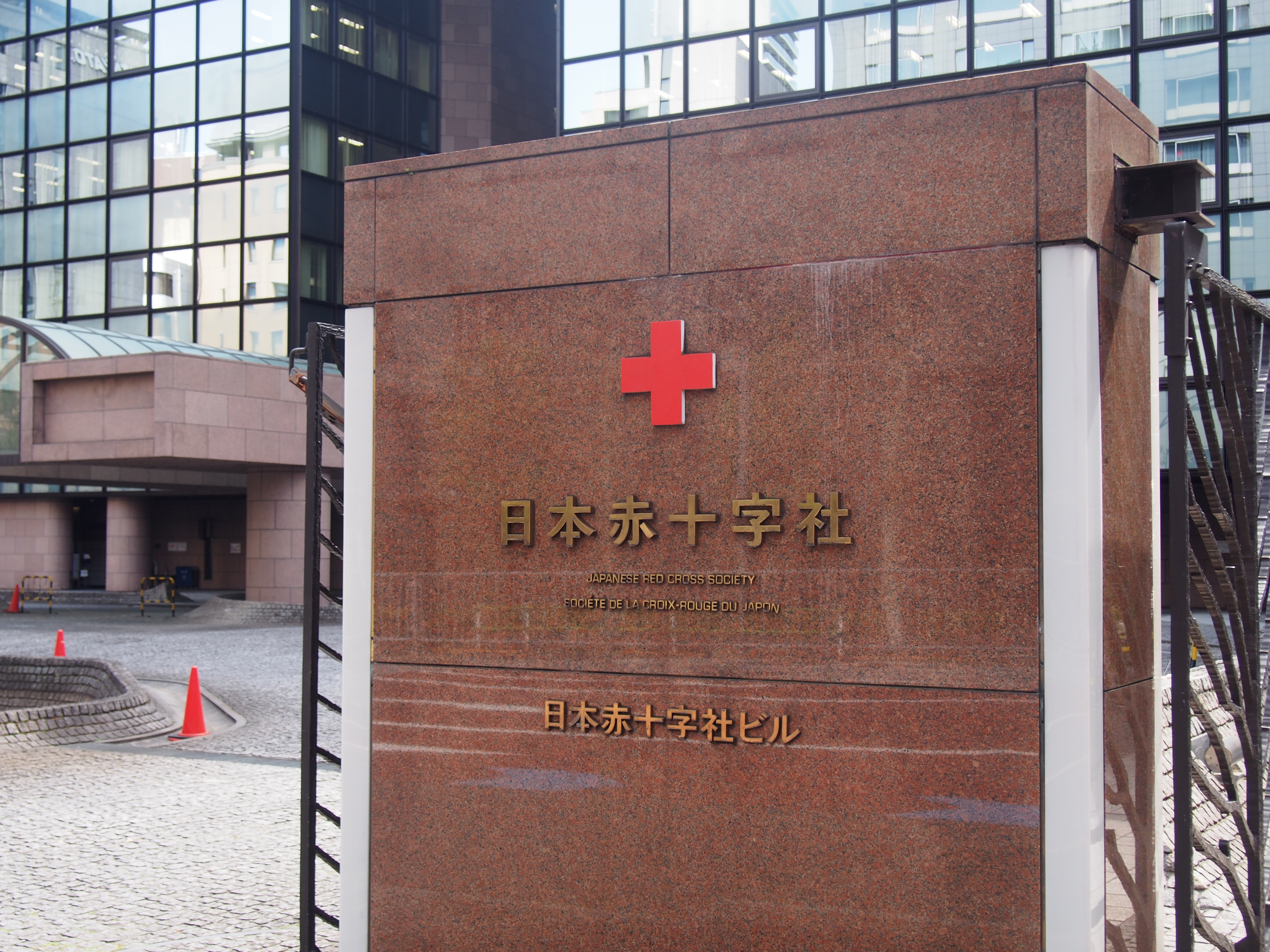
Headquarters of Japanese Red Cross Society (Minato, Tokyo)

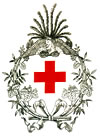
Symbol similar to the one seen on the Society’s membership medals

The Japanese Red Cross Society (日本赤十字社, Nippon Sekijūjisha) is the Japanese affiliate of the International Red Cross.

The Imperial Family of Japan has traditionally supported the society, with the Empress as Honorary President and other imperial family members as vice presidents. Its headquarters is located in Tokyo, and local chapters are set up in all 47 prefectures. 9,610,000 individual and 120,000 corporate members belong to the society, which operates 92 Red Cross hospitals and 79 blood centers all over the country. The Japanese Red Cross Society conducts relief activities when major disasters take place. Large earthquakes that frequently occur in Japan (such as the 1923 Great Kantō earthquake, the 1995 Great Hanshin earthquake, and the 2011 Tōhoku earthquake and tsunami) are an area of work for the society.

== History ==
Flag of the Red Cross

Hakuai Sha - used by the organization until 1887

Count Sano Tsunetami founded the Philanthropic Society (博愛社, Hakuaisha), a relief organization for the injured of the Satsuma Rebellion of 1877; a modified version of the Japanese flag was used by the organization until 1887. Its name was changed to the Japanese Red Cross Society on 2 September 1887 following Japan's admission to the International Committee of the Red Cross. Later that year, the society engaged in its first disaster relief after the eruption of Mount Bandai.

From the beginning, the Japanese Imperial family, especially Empress Shōken, provided active support for Red Cross activities. The attendance of the imperial family made membership in the society socially attractive to members of the Kazoku aristocracy and leading members of society. By the start of the Russo-Japanese War (1904–1905), the Japanese Red Cross Society was the largest in the world, with over a million members. The Society played an outstanding role with regard to the many Russian prisoners of war, gaining Japan a considerable amount of good public relations in the western press. This image was cultivated by the hosting of volunteer nurses and medical staff from the United States, France, Germany, and Great Britain. A report from Anita Newcomb McGee on conditions in Japan was instrumental in obtaining government assistance in the revitalization of the American Red Cross.

After the 1906 San Francisco earthquake, the Japanese Red Cross Society collected $146,000 for the American relief effort, marking the first overseas operation by the society.

In September 1914, during World War I, at the request of the Imperial Japanese Army, the Red Cross put together three squads, each composed of one surgeon and twenty nurses, who were dispatched to Europe on a five-month assignment. The teams left Japan between October and December 1914 and were assigned to Petrograd, Paris, and Southampton. The arrival of these nurses received wide press coverage, and their host countries subsequently asked for these teams to extend their assignment to fifteen months. Meanwhile, within Japan, German prisoners of war, who had been captured at the Battle of Tsingtao, were treated fairly well with the help of the Red Cross.

In 1934, the Japanese Red Cross Society hosted the 15th International Conference of the Red Cross in Tokyo.

During the Second Sino-Japanese War (1937–1945), the Japanese Red Cross Society played a vital role in assisting Japanese civilians and wounded soldiers. However, as the Imperial Japanese Army tended to ignore the Geneva Convention, government and military restrictions hampered the ability of the Japanese Red Cross Society to assist the hundreds of thousands of European military and civilians interned in prison camps in the Japanese-occupied areas of Southeast Asia.

After World War II, the Japanese Red Cross Society was reformed under American advisers. On 14 August 1952, it was given legal status as a special non-profit corporation.

== See also ==
- International Red Cross and Red Crescent Movement
- List of Red Cross and Red Crescent Societies
