= Princess Yōko of Mikasa =

Japanese princess (born 1983)

Princess Yōko
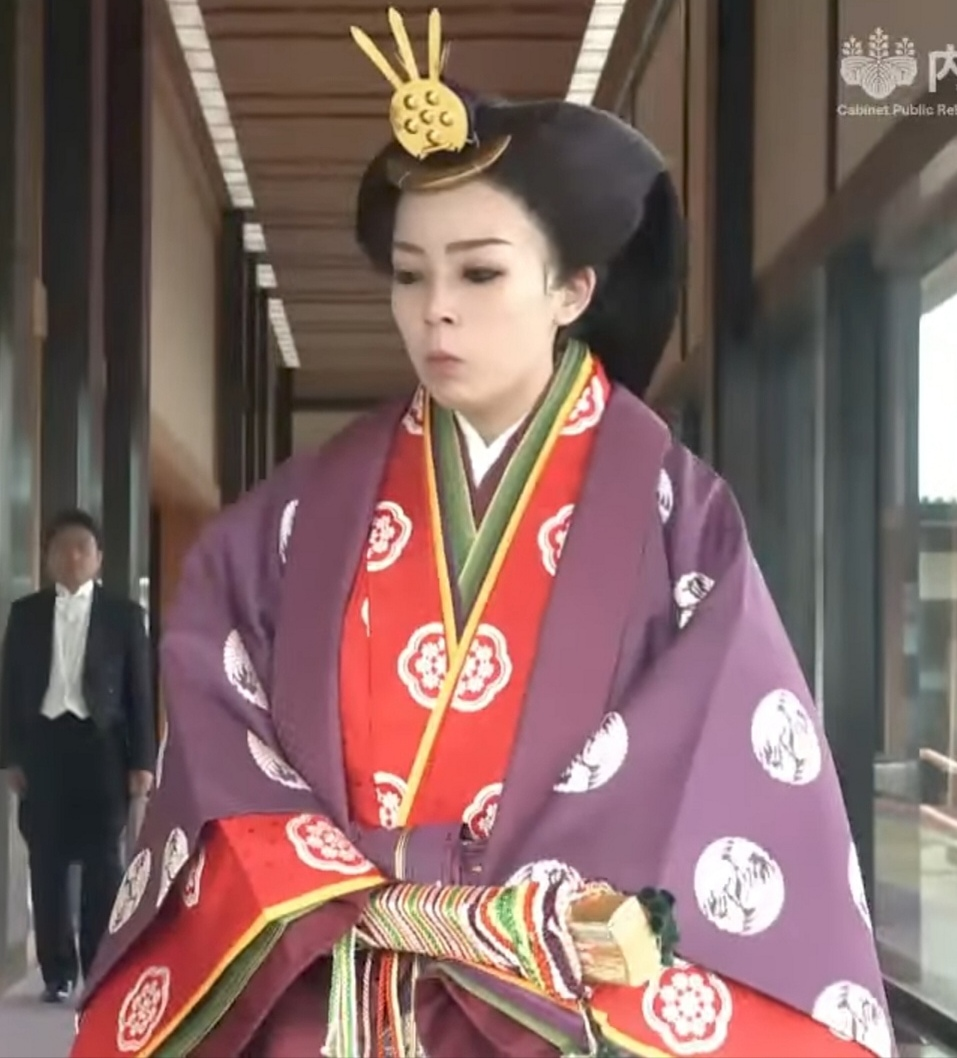
- Yōko in 2019
- Born: 25 October 1983 (age 42); Japanese Red Cross Medical Center, Hiroo, Shibuya, Tokyo, Japan
- House: Imperial House of Japan
- Father: Prince Tomohito of Mikasa
- Mother: Nobuko Asō

Princess Yōko of Mikasa (瑶子女王, Yōko Joō; born 25 October 1983) is a member of the Imperial House of Japan, paternal second cousin of Emperor Naruhito and the second daughter of Prince Tomohito of Mikasa and Princess Tomohito of Mikasa (Nobuko). She is also the niece of Japan's 92nd prime minister Tarō Asō (who is the older brother of her mother), great-niece of author and literary critic Ken'ichi Yoshida, and great-granddaughter of Japan's 45th prime minister Shigeru Yoshida.

== Biography ==
=== Early life and education ===
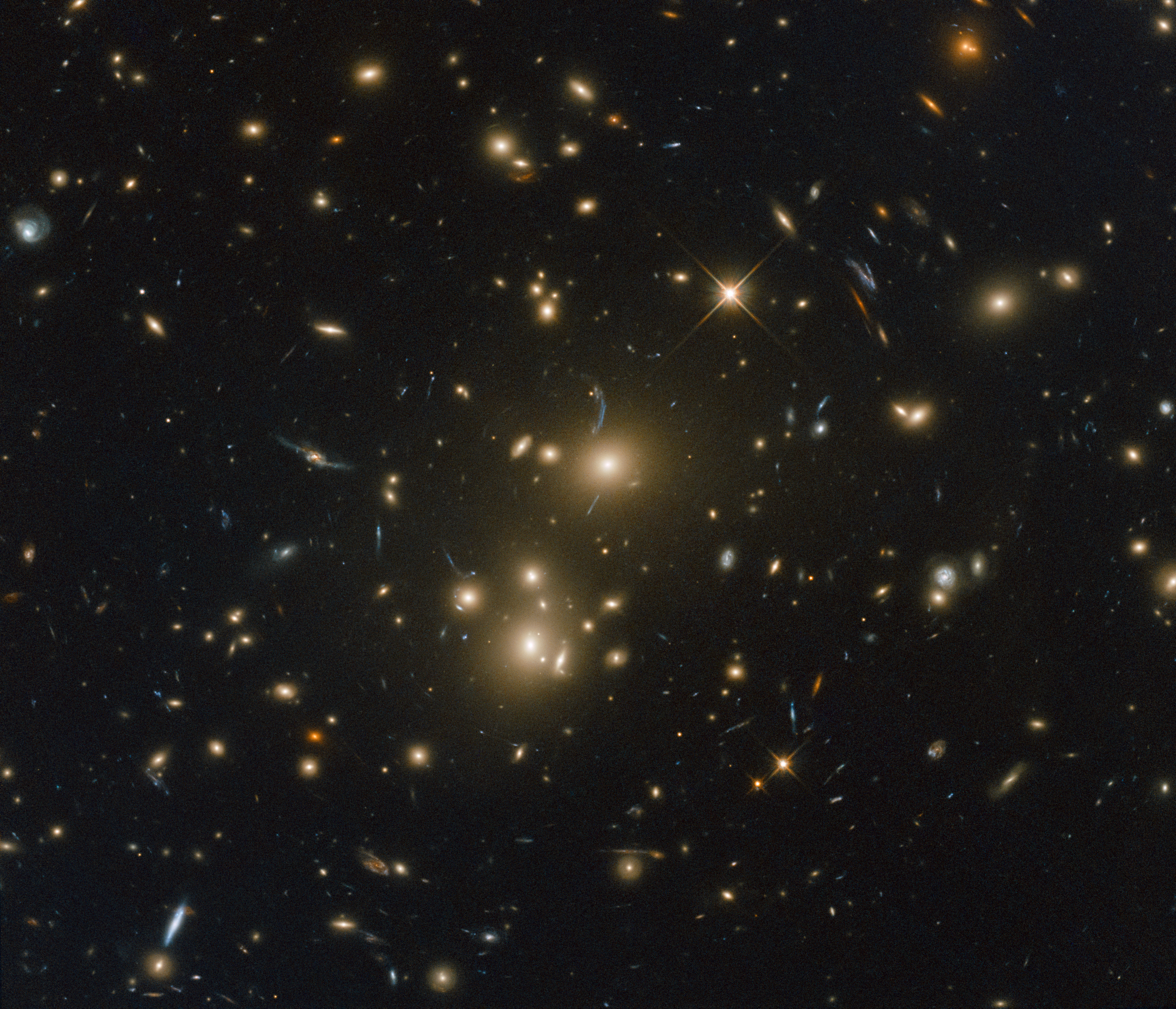
Stars, designated imperial personal emblem of Yōko

Princess Yōko (Note: The Imperial Household Agency website spells the princess' name as Yohko.) was born on 25 October 1983 at the Japanese Red Cross Medical Center in Hiroo, Shibuya, Tokyo, the second and last child and daughter of Prince Tomohito of Mikasa and his wife Princess Nobuko. She attended the prestigious Gakushūin School for her primary, junior high, and high school education. The Princess is a graduate of the Gakushuin Women's College, the Faculty of Intercultural Studies, the Department of Japanese Studies with a bachelor's degree in Japanese studies.

A practitioner of the traditional Japanese martial art of kendo from an early age, the Princess was selected to participate in exhibition tournaments in France and Germany in 2005, as well as the Aichi World's Fair held the same year. In July 2006, Princess Yōko attended the national convention Kendo Housewives.

=== Public appearances ===
Princess Yōko came of age in October 2003 and attended a press conference on her birthday, during which reporters asked her about her plans for the future. For the occasion, she received the second class of the Order of the Precious Crown and was able to begin to take part in royal duties and official engagements.

Princess Yōko has been active in various volunteer activities, especially with the Japanese Red Cross Society, from December 2006 to November 2012. She was inaugurated as the Patron of the International Association for Universal Design (IAUD) in August 2013, a position previously held by her father. She was also inaugurated as the President of the Social Welfare Organization Yuai Jyuji Kai in January 2014.

=== Household ===
On 6 June 2012 Prince Tomohito died from multiple organ failure. His funeral and ceremony was attended by Princess Yōko and other members of the Imperial Family. In June 2013 in a statement about the Prince's household, it was announced by the Imperial Household Agency that "it [had] reduced the number of households in the Imperial family by one", integrating it into the household led by his father. According to the agency's officials the household integration would not have any effect on lives of the widow and daughters of Prince Tomohito. In September 2025 and subsequent to the death of Princess Mikasa, Yōko's elder sister Akiko assumed the leadership of the Mikasa branch of the imperial family, becoming the first princess of the blood royal to head a household in decades. Yōko remains in the original household now carried on by her elder sister while a separate household was established for their mother.

== Health ==
In March 2017 Princess Yōko suffered from cerebral anemia while walking out with a friend in Tokyo: she felt dizzy and subsequently fell hard onto her knees; after going to the Imperial Household Agency Hospital due to pain in her knees, she had to shorten her official schedule by a month to recover.

On 8 February 2022 Princess Yōko was hospitalized at the University of Tokyo Hospital due to moderate pneumonia after testing positive for COVID-19, the first case into the Imperial family. Princess Yōko was discharged from the University of Tokyo Hospital on 16 February after recovering from COVID-19. She returned to her Akasaka estate where she would recover from pneumonia. The doctors gave their permission after judging the Princess's condition as stable.

On 25 March 2022, Princess Yōko spoke at a conference for deaf people about her "sensorineural hearing loss" and that it is sometimes difficult for her to hold a conversation due to her hearing loss. Subsequently, she revealed that her sensorineural hearing loss is due to Ménière's syndrome.

== Motorsports ==
In 2024 Super Formula Championship, the July Super Formula round at Fuji Speedway was named the Princess Yoko Cup in her honor. The press release announcing the event noted that she had served as the president of the Tokyo Motor Show and Japan Mobility Show. She spoke at the drivers' briefing and noted that she was a fan of motorsports and regularly read Japanese and global racing news.

== Honours ==
Mon of the Mikasa branch of the Imperial Family

=== National honours ===
- Member 2nd Class (Peony) of the Order of the Precious Crown –

=== Honorary positions ===
- President of the Princess Yoko Foundation.
- Honorary President of the Japan Universal Sound Design Association.
- President of the Tokyo Motor Show and Japan Mobility Show.
- President of the Social Welfare Organization "Yuaijujikai".
- Honorary Advisor of the Inclusive Design Network.
- Patron of the International Association for Universal Design (IAUD).
