= Princess Tomohito of Mikasa =

Japanese princess (born 1955)

Nobuko
- Princess Tomohito of Mikasa
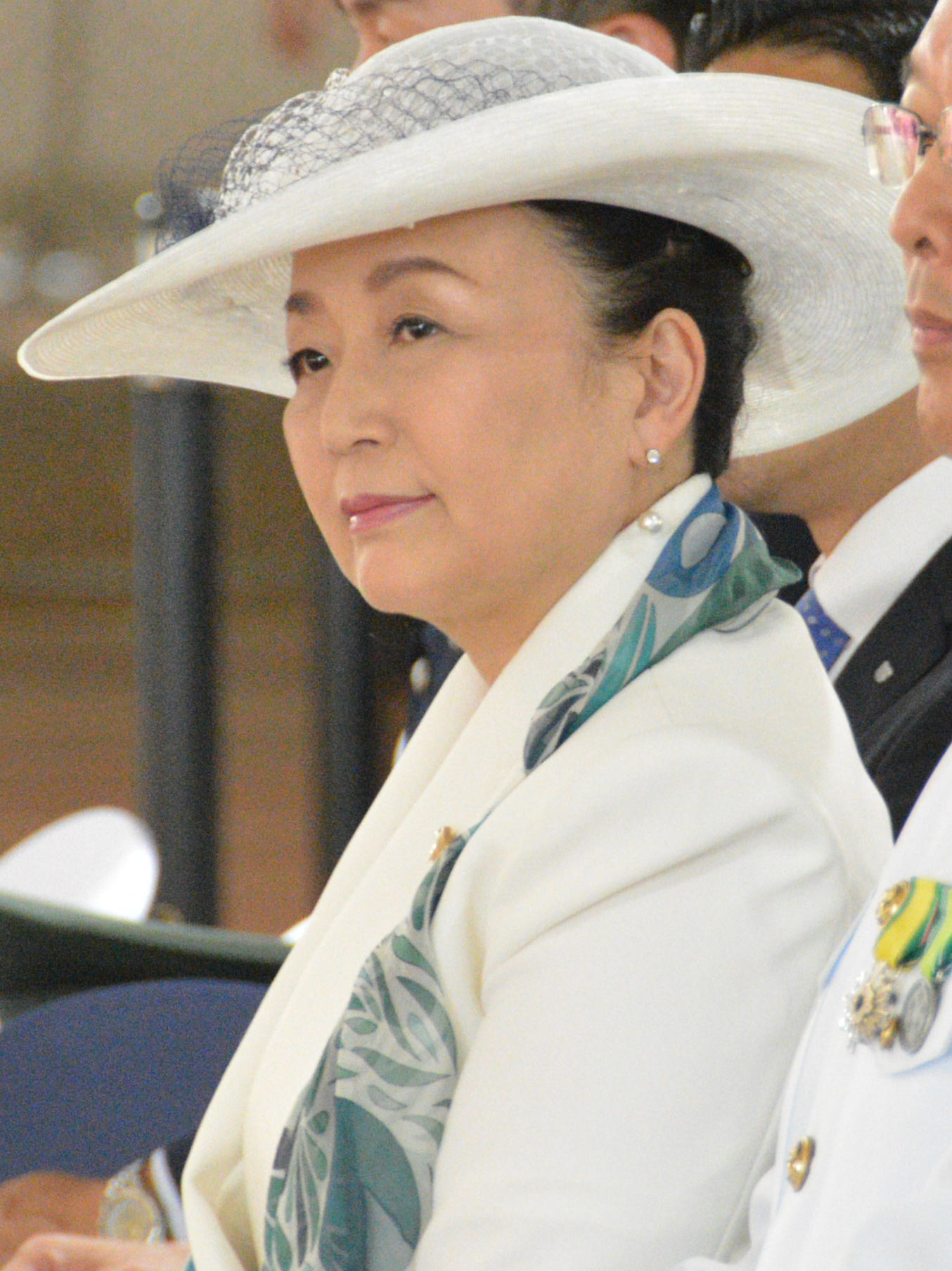
- Nobuko in 2017
- Born: Nobuko Asō (麻生信子); 9 April 1955 (age 71); Shibuya, Tokyo, Japan
- Spouse: Prince Tomohito of Mikasa (m. 1980; died 2012)
- Issue: Princess Akiko of Mikasa; Princess Yōko of Mikasa
- House: Imperial House of Japan (by marriage)
- Father: Takakichi Asō
- Mother: Kazuko Yoshida

Princess Tomohito of Mikasa (寛仁親王妃信子, Tomohito Shinnōhi Nobuko) (born Nobuko Asō (麻生信子, Asō Nobuko); 9 April 1955) is a member of the Japanese imperial family as the widow of Prince Tomohito of Mikasa.

== Background and education ==
Nobuko, a Catholic, was born on 9 April 1955 in Tokyo. She is the third daughter and youngest child of Takakichi Asō (麻生太賀吉, Asō Takakichi; 1911–1980), the chairman of the Asō Company (originally known for developing coal mines and metallurgy, today specializing mainly in cement making, as well as being in the medical, environmental and real estate sectors) and a member of the House of Representatives from 1949 to 1955. He was also a close associate of Prime Minister Kakuei Tanaka. Her mother, Kazuko Yoshida (吉田和子, Yoshida Kazuko; 1915–1996), was the daughter of Prime Minister Shigeru Yoshida. Her elder brother is the former Prime Minister Tarō Asō.

Through her paternal grandmother, she descends from a younger branch of the feudal Ichinomiya clan. She is the great-granddaughter of the diplomat Count Nobuaki Makino (牧野伸顕, Makino Nobuaki; 1861–1949) and the great-great-granddaughter of the samurai Ōkubo Toshimichi, famous for having been the cause of the Satsuma Rebellion in 1877.

She studied in England and graduated from Rosslyn House College in 1973. After returning to Japan, she taught English in Shoto kindergarten in the district of Shibuya, Tokyo.

== Marriage and children ==
Whilst in the UK she met her future husband, Prince Tomohito of Mikasa, himself a student at Oxford University. His first marriage proposal was rejected in 1973 because of Nobuko's young age. The Imperial Household Council announced the engagement of Prince Tomohito of Mikasa and Nobuko Asō on 18 April 1980 and the engagement ceremony was held on 21 May 1980. The wedding ceremony took place on 7 November 1980 and she became Princess Tomohito of Mikasa. As tradition dictates, upon her entry into the imperial family and like other members, she received a personal emblem (o-shirushi (お印)): the flower of Prunus persica (hanamomo (花桃)). Born a Catholic, she is not the first Christian to enter the imperial family as Empress Michiko also came from a Catholic family and was raised in Christian religious institutions.

The couple had two daughters:

- Princess Akiko (彬子女王, Akiko Joō; born 20 December 1981 in Tokyo)
- Princess Yōko (瑶子女王, Yōko Joō; born 25 October 1983 at Japanese Red Cross Medical Center in Tokyo)

The family lived in a compound within the Akasaka Estate complex, in Moto-Akasaka, Minato, Tokyo. In October 2009 and amid her illness, she separated her residence from her husband and children. In a 2015 article for the Japanese Huffington Post, her daughter Akiko referred to the "long-standing discord" between her parents and added that since her mother left the household for treatment she had "not been able to properly speak with her for over ten years".

The Princess became a widow on 6 June 2012, upon the death of her husband. Nobuko did not appear publicly during the mourning period, and their daughter Princess Akiko acted as the chief mourner. In June 2013 in a statement about the Prince's household, it was announced by the Imperial Household Agency that "it [had] reduced the number of households in the Imperial family by one", integrating it into the household led by his father. According to the agency's officials the household integration would not have any effect on the lives of the widow and daughters of Prince Tomohito. In September 2025 and subsequent to the death of Princess Mikasa, Nobuko's daughter Akiko assumed the leadership of the Mikasa branch of the imperial family, becoming the first princess of the blood royal to head a household in decades. A separate household was established for Nobuko, marking the first time a royal household had been created for a princess by marriage since 1889.

== Official duties ==
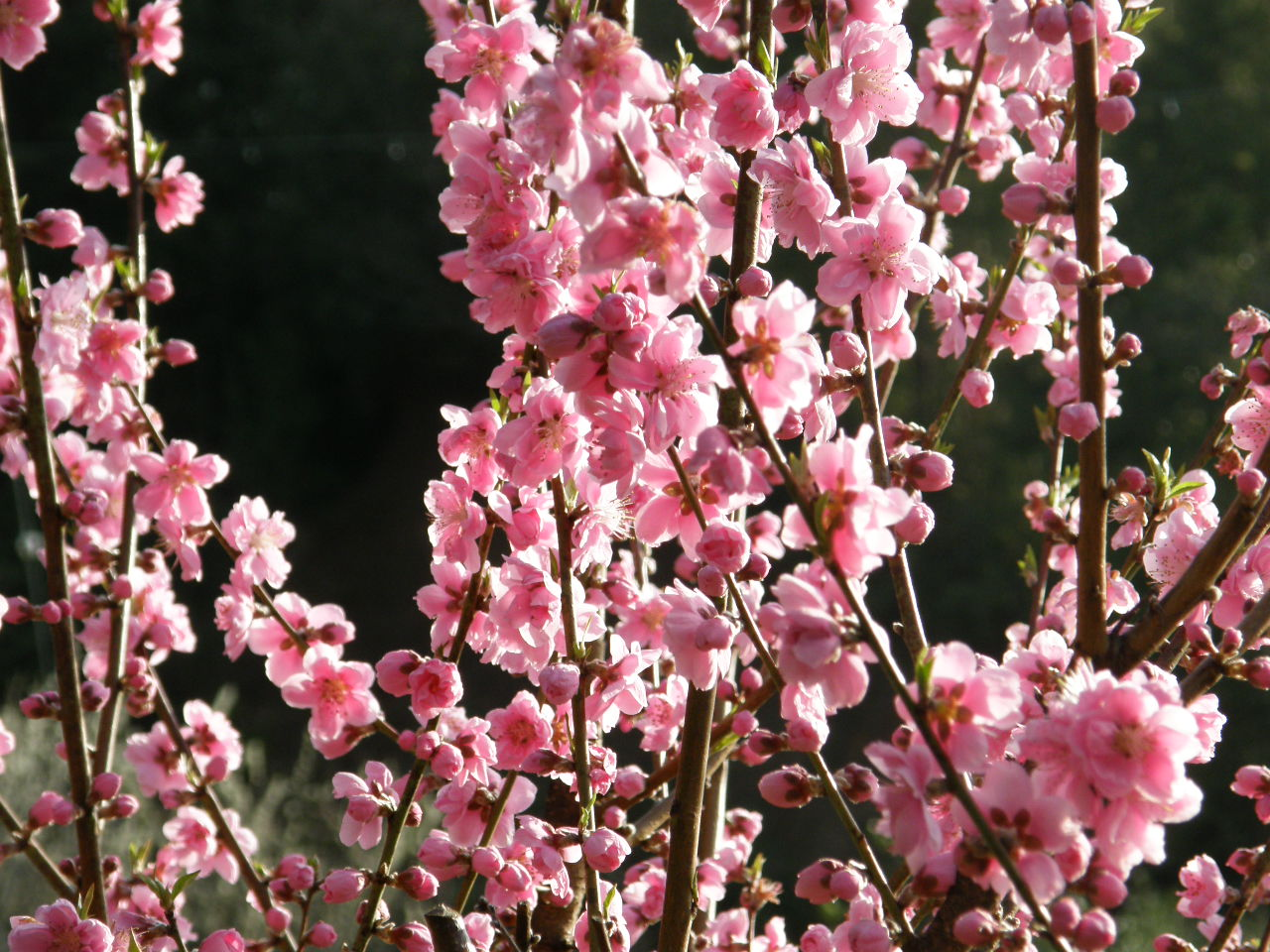
Peach flowers, Prunus persica, designated imperial personal emblem of Nobuko

The Princess accompanied her husband on various missions abroad to charity and welfare events, especially those concerning health issues. She is engaged in various welfare organisations and holds positions as president and vice-president.

In 1990, the Prince and Princess visited Turkey to attended the celebrations held for the 100th year of relations between Japan and Turkey. In December 1992, the couple visited the cancer ward at New York Medical College. In May 1994, they went to Hawaii mainly to attend a charity dinner held for the reconstruction of Kuakini Hospital. In February 1994, the Prince and Princess attended the Lillehammer Winter Olympics in Norway. In July 1994, Nobuko visited Australia on her own to support the Sydney Royal Research Institute for those with audio-visual disabilities. In April 1998, Tomohito and Nobuko travelled to Turkey to attend the opening ceremony of the Turkey-Japan Foundation Cultural Centre. In July 2003, the Princess in her capacity as Honorary President of the Japan Rose Society, visited Glasgow, United Kingdom, to attend the World Rose Convention.

On 1 November 2013, Princess Tomohito of Mikasa visited Fukushima Prefecture and met with the people affected by the earthquake which occurred on 11 March 2011. The Princess had not performed any official duty since January 2006 because of a stroke and her asthma and it was her first official appearance in seven years. Since then, she has returned to public life.

Princess Nobuko attended the state funeral of former Prime Minister Shinzo Abe on 27 September 2022 in Tokyo with her eldest daughter, Princess Akiko.

== Other interests ==
Princess Tomohito is usually presented by her family as an excellent chef, and has published two books of recipes titled:

- Published in May 1992: Home cooking through the seasons – 80 kinds of side dishes (四季の家庭料理―お惣菜80種, Shiki no katei ryōri ― ozōsai 80-shu). Kōbunsha Publishing Co., Ltd. (ISBN 4334780075)
- Published in October 2013: Memories are made of home cooked meals (思い出の先にはいつも家庭料理, Omoide no saki niwa itsumo katei ryōri). Magazine House (ISBN 4838726201)

The second book features recipes and ingredients common in Fukushima Prefecture.

== Health ==
Princess Nobuko suffered from brain ischemia in May 2004, which forced her to withdraw for a while to the villa of Sōma family in Karuizawa, Nagano Prefecture, for medical treatment and rest. She continued her rest due to menopause, but in 2006 she returned to Tokyo once to give her New Year's prayers. She went to Karuizawa again for treatment and her symptoms subsided, which resulted in plans for her to return to Tokyo in May. However, the return was postponed due to Prince Tomohito's poor health, who returned to the palace in August of the same year for the first time in two years.

In 2008, she suffered from asthma and was repeatedly in and out of the hospital. She underwent long-term medical treatment at the villa of her older siblings, and even after returning to Tokyo, she did not return to the imperial residence, but instead lived in the official residence of the Commissioner of the Imperial Household Agency. In October 2009, she moved from the hospital where she was hospitalized to the Imperial Household Agency building for medical treatment.

On the night of 8 September 2019, Princess Nobuko fell at her home in Tokyo. The next morning, due to persistent pain, the Princess went to Keio University Hospital in Tokyo, where she was diagnosed with a first lumbar vertebral fracture. She was prescribed a total recovery period of 3 months.

Princess Nobuko was diagnosed with stage one breast cancer in November 2022. Doctors expressed no concern about her case, as she had no obvious symptoms of cancer. The Princess was admitted to Keio University Hospital on 16 November for further examinations, and her surgery to remove the tumor was held on 19 November. After undergoing the surgery, which lasted 2 hours, it was discovered that her breast cancer was at stage 0, and not at stage 1. The Princess was discharged from the hospital on 24 November, after doctors confirmed that her recovery was going well and that the chances of cancer recurrence were very low. She received radiation therapy over 25 sessions at Keio University Hospital between 23 January and 27 February 2023.

On 4 March 2024 the Princess underwent surgery for primary angle-closure and cataracts at Keio University Hospital.

== Titles and styles ==
Styles of Nobuko, Princess Tomohito of Mikasa
- Reference style: Her Imperial Highness
- Spoken style: Your Imperial Highness

Since her marriage, Nobuko is styled as Her Imperial Highness Princess Tomohito of Mikasa.

== Honours ==
=== National honours ===
- Japan: Grand Cordon of the Order of the Precious Crown.
- Japan: Dame of the Decoration of the Red Cross.
- Japan: Recipient of the Red Cross Medal.

=== Foreign honours ===
- Norway : Grand Cross of the Order of St. Olav (26 March 2001).

=== Honorary Positions ===
- President of the Tokyo Jikeikai
- Honorary President of the Japan Rose Society
- Honorary President of the Doyo Society of Japan
- Honorary President of the Japan Building Maintenance Association
- Honorary President of the Women's Healthcare Awareness & Menopause Network Society
- Honorary Vice-President of the Japanese Red Cross Society
- International Judo Federation Ambassador

== Ancestry ==
(Chigai Kuginuki), The mon of the Asō clan

Princess Tomohito is a patrilineal descendant of the Asō clan and is maternally descended from Ōkubo Toshimichi through his son Count Makino Nobuaki. Through her paternal grandmother the Hon. Kanō Natsuko, she is descended from the Tachibana clan of the Miike Domain and from a cadet branch of the Ōkubo clan, who ruled the Odawara Domain. Through her link to the Ōkubo clan, she is an eighth cousin of her late husband and of the present Emperor; all three are seven-times-great-grandchildren of the sixth lord of Hirado, Matsura Atsunobu (1684–1757). They are also tenth cousins by virtue of their descent from Seikanji Hirofusa (1633–1686), a senior palace courtier who held the rank of dainagon in the late-17th century.
