= Miyashita Park =

Park in Shibuya, Tokyo, Japan

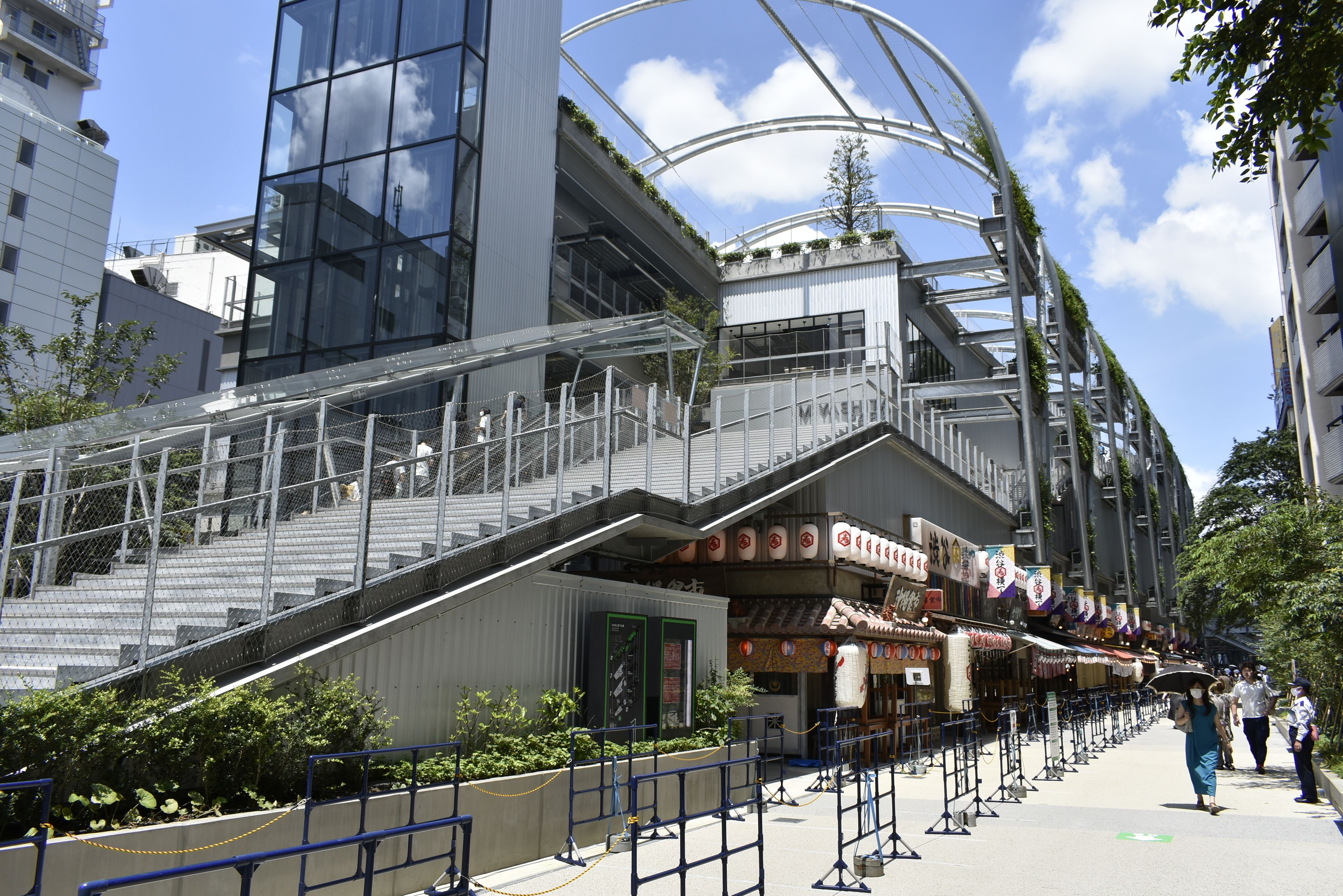
- The park and its commercial complex as of 2020
- Interactive map of Miyashita Park
- Location: Tokyo
- Coordinates: 35.6612°N 139.7017°E
- Created: 1953
- Website: https://www.miyashita-park.tokyo/

Miyashita Park (宮下公園, Miyashita kōen) is a park in the 6th district of Jingūmae, in the Shibuya Ward of Tokyo.

== Background ==
Miyashita Park is situated in one of the few green spaces within the business neighborhood of Shibuya Ward, surrounded on one side by the tracks of the Yamanote Line and Saikyō Line running between Shibuya station and Harajuku station, by Meiji Street on another side, the Shibuya River (渋谷川) and Udagawa river (宇田川) (both currently used as covered drainage conduits). From the time it was opened until 1964 when the Tokyo Olympics were held, the park was above ground just as is Jingu Street Park (神宮通り公園) adjacent to Harajuku; however, when a parking lot was set up in conjunction with the transformation of Shibuya River into a drainage conduit, the park was redeveloped on man-made land above the parking lot.

Plans by Nike to buy out the name of Miyashita Park, rename it "Miyashita Nike Park", install skateboarding grounds and a cafe, and remove local homeless squatters from the park caused controversy in 2008.

The park closed in 2017 and reopened in July 2020 as a shopping complex with a rooftop park.

== History ==
- 1948 Through a project by the Tokyo Metropolitan Government, a park is planned in the space between Meiji Street, Yamanote Line, Udagawa river and Shibuya river.
- 1953 Miyashita Park is officially open.
- 1964 All at one time, Shibuya river next to the park is converted into a drainage conduit, Miyashita park is moved onto man-made land, and a parking lot is built below it.
- 2006 A new futsal court is established.
- 2017 closed for redevelopment
- 2020 reopened as shopping complex with rooftop park
