= Prince Tomohito of Mikasa =

Japanese prince (1946–2012)

Tomohito
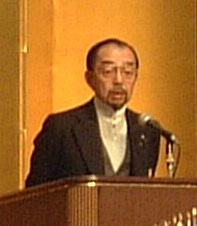
- Tomohito in 2003
- Born: 5 January 1946; Hayama, Kanagawa, Japan
- Died: 6 June 2012 (aged 66); Tokyo, Japan
- Burial: 14 June 2012; Toshimagaoka Imperial Cemetery, Bunkyo, Tokyo
- Spouse: Nobuko Asō (m. 1980)
- Issue: Princess Akiko of Mikasa; Princess Yōko of Mikasa
- House: Mikasa-no-miya
- Dynasty: Imperial House of Japan
- Father: Takahito, Prince Mikasa
- Mother: Yuriko Takagi

Prince Tomohito of Mikasa (寛仁親王, Tomohito Shinnō; 5 January 1946 – 6 June 2012) was a member of the Imperial House of Japan and the eldest son of Takahito, Prince Mikasa and Yuriko, Princess Mikasa. He was a first cousin of Emperor Akihito, and was formerly sixth in the line of succession to the Japanese throne and the heir apparent to the princely house of Mikasa-no-miya and the title "Prince Mikasa". Prince Tomohito was the first member of the Imperial House of Japan with a full beard since Emperor Meiji, thus earning him the popular nickname of the "Bearded Prince" (ヒゲの殿下 Hige no Denka). He died of cancer on 6 June 2012, aged 66.

== Early life and education ==
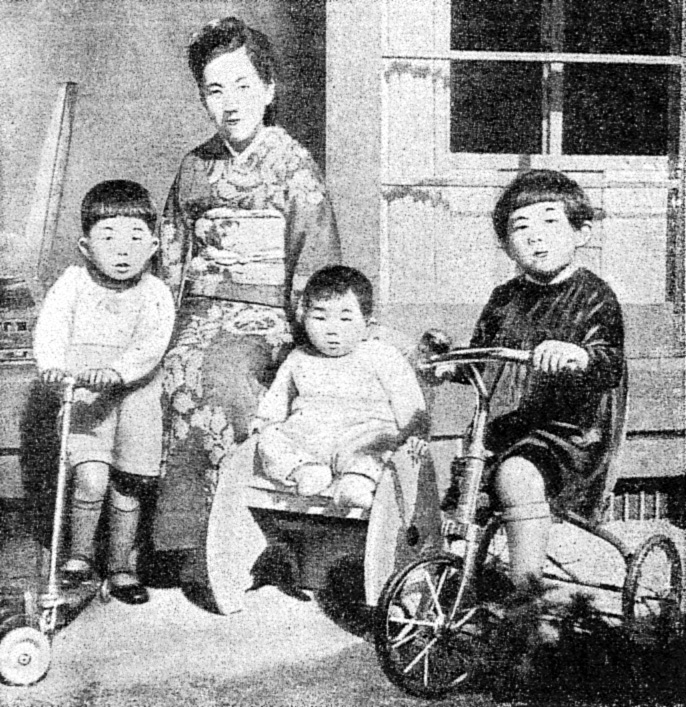
Prince Tomohito (far left) with (from left to right) his mother Princess Mikasa, his brother Prince Yoshihito, and his sister Princess Yasuko, c. 1950

Prince Tomohito was born on 5 January 1946 at Prince Mikasa's family home. He graduated from the Department of Political Studies in the Faculty of Law of Gakushuin University in 1968. From 1968 – 1970, he studied at Magdalen College, University of Oxford, in the United Kingdom.

== Marriage and family ==
The Prince became engaged to Miss Nobuko Asō on 21 May 1980. She is the third daughter of the late Takakichi Asō, chairman of Asō Cement Co., and his wife, Kazuko, the daughter of former Prime Minister, Shigeru Yoshida. She is also the sister of former Prime Minister and Deputy Prime Minister Tarō Asō. The couple married on 7 November 1980. Miss Asō was given the title HIH Princess Tomohito of Mikasa. The Prince and Princess had two daughters:

- Princess Akiko (彬子女王, Akiko Joō; born 20 December 1981 in Tokyo)
- Princess Yōko (瑶子女王, Yōko Joō; born 25 October 1983 at Japanese Red Cross Medical Center in Tokyo)

The family lived in a compound within the Akasaka Estate complex, in Moto-Akasaka, Minato, Tokyo. In October 2009, his wife separated her residence from him and their children.

== Public service ==
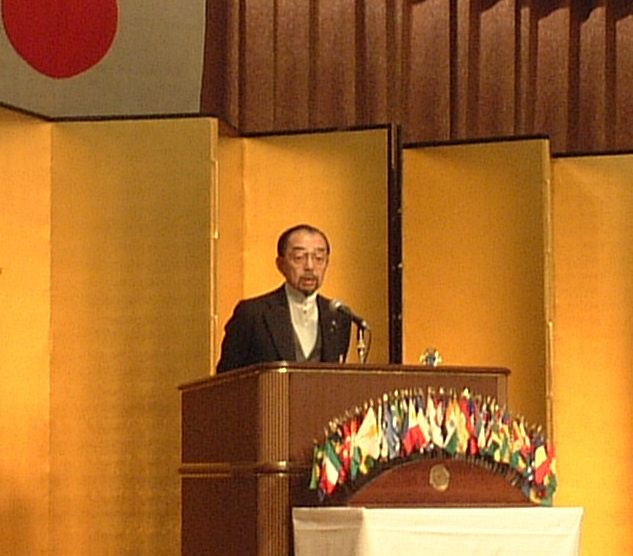
Speech at Grand Prince Hotel Takanawa on 7 March 2003

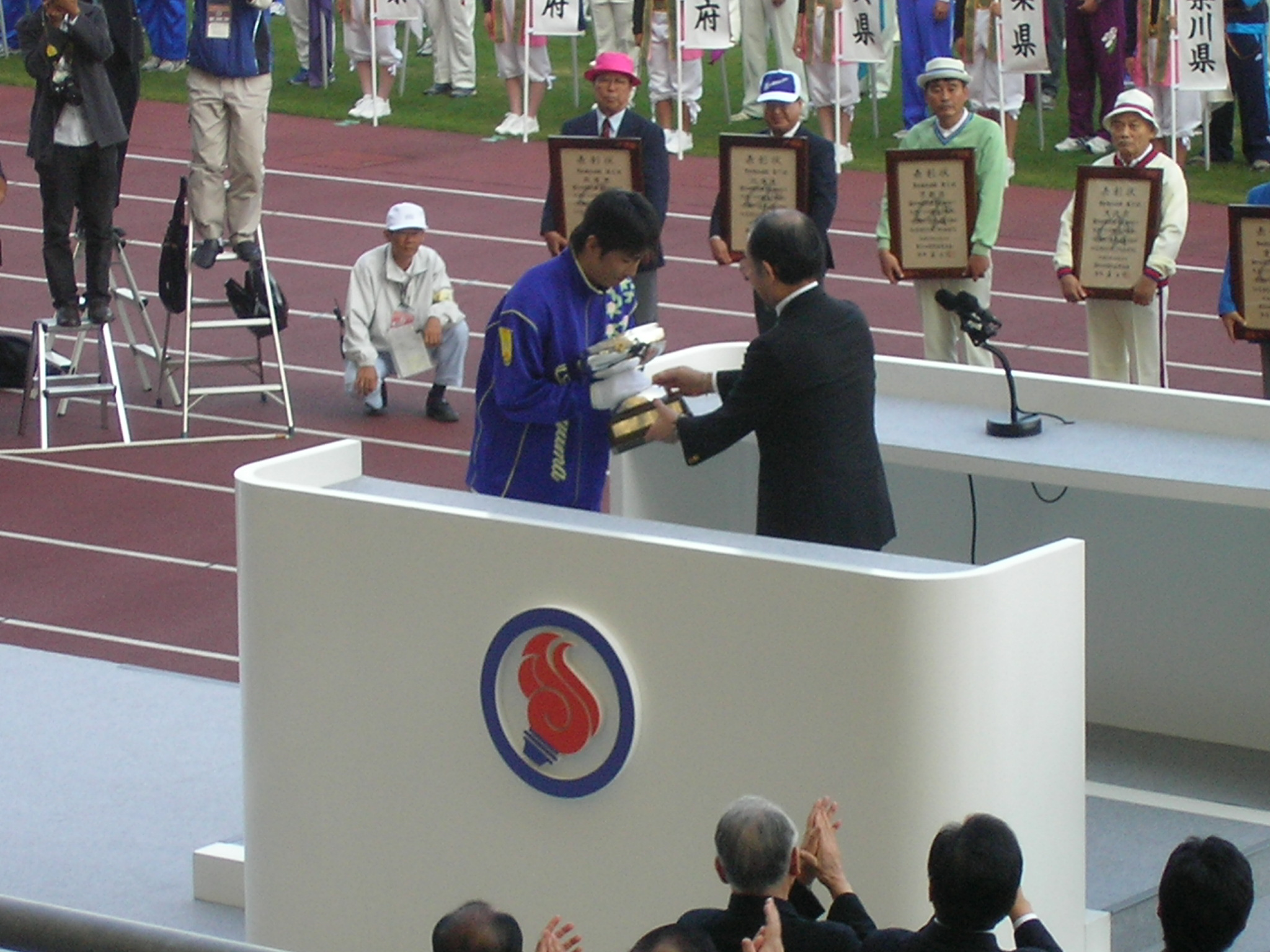
60th National Sports Festival "Hare no Kuni Okayama Kokutai" Closing Ceremony at Momotaro Stadium, 27 October 2005

For the 1972 Sapporo Winter Olympics, Prince Tomohito served as a committee member on the organizing committee from 1970 until 1972. He was also on the committee for the 1975 Okinawa World Fair.

Prince Tomohito was president and honorary president of various organizations that concerned themselves with cancer research (the Princess Takamatsu Cancer Research Fund), having himself suffered from the disease from 2003, youth education and promotion of international relations. He was also noted for his support of organizations which promoted the welfare of people with physical or mental disabilities through sporting activities, such as skiing, bowling, dancing and rugby. He traveled extensively abroad with the princess on charity, and support missions that concerned matters of illness and welfare. The Prince often gave lectures and contributed articles to national newspapers and magazines, and had also authored seven books.

In December 1992, the Prince and Princess visited the United States to support a newly established cancer ward in the New York Medical College, and in 1994, visited Hawaii to support the reconstruction of Kuakini Hospital. In February 1994, the Prince and Princess visited Norway to attend the 1994 Winter Olympics in Lillehammer, Norway.

In April 1998, the Prince and Princess visited Turkey to attend the opening ceremony of the Turkey-Japan Foundation Cultural Centre. They had previously visited Turkey in 1990 as part of the celebrations for the 100th anniversary of Japan-Turkey relations. The Prince strongly supported the establishment of a Japanese Institute of Anatolian Archaeology at the Middle Eastern Culture Center in Japan, and returned to Turkey again in October 2002, June 2003 and October 2003 leading three groups of benefactors on tours of the heritage of Turkey.

In June 1998, Prince Tomohito visited Australia for fundraising activities for a medical science foundation to commemorate the Australian Nobel Prize winner Dr. Howard Walter Florey. In December of the same year, he visited Thailand to attend the 13th Asian Games.

In April 2003, Prince Tomohito visited Norway accompanied by his daughter, Princess Akiko to attend the World Cross Country Ski Championships for the Visually Disabled.

He appeared on the radio as a DJ in his younger days, particularly his appearance on All Night Nippon in 1975.

== Health problems and death ==
The Prince was first diagnosed with cancer in 1991, but later went into remission. He was diagnosed with cancer of the larynx in 2003, and immediately began treatment for it. In September 2006, he fractured his jaw, which had been weakened by his chemotherapy treatments. In 2007, the Prince made a public announcement that he was suffering from alcoholism, and was undergoing treatments at the Imperial Household Agency hospital. In March 2008, his cancer spread to his pharynx, and he underwent surgery. Although attempts were made to save his voice, he subsequently suffered from pneumonia caused by his inability to properly swallow food, and was thereafter only able to speak with the aid of a mechanical larynx.

On 6 June 2012, the Prince died from multiple organ failure at the Sasaki Institute Kyoundo Hospital in Tokyo, aged 66. He had been hospitalized for some time, as a result of his multiple cancer diagnoses. Around 660 people attended his funeral, which was held at the Toshimagaoka Imperial Cemetery.

In June 2013, the Imperial Household Agency stated that they had integrated his family into the household led by his father.

== Views on the imperial succession ==
Amid the Japanese imperial succession debate, then-Prime Minister Junichirō Koizumi strongly supported the revision of the Imperial Household Law to allow a woman to ascend to the Imperial Throne, pledging to present a bill to the 2006 session of the parliament. Some conservative lawmakers opposed Koizumi and said the debate was premature. Prince Tomohito also opposed the proposal, saying that the official male members of the Japanese imperial family might take up concubines in order to produce male members because it was previously possible for a male illegitimate child to assume the imperial throne. Later he said that this remark was just a joke.

== Honours ==
Styles of Prince Tomohito of Mikasa
- Mikasa-no-miya mon
- Reference style: His Imperial Highness
- Spoken style: Your Imperial Highness

=== National honours ===
- Grand Cordon of the Order of the Chrysanthemum (05/06/1966)

=== Foreign honours ===
- Italy : Knight Grand Cross of the Order of Merit of the Italian Republic (09/03/1982)

=== Honorary degree ===
- Ankara University

=== Honorary positions ===
- President of the Social Welfare Organization Yuai Jyuji Kai
- President of the Arinomama-sha
- President of the Social Welfare Organization Saiseikai Imperial Gift Foundation Inc.
- President of the New Technology Development Foundation
- President of the Princess Takamatsu Cancer Research Fund
- President of the Nippon Billiard Association
- President of the Professional Ski Instructors Association of Japan
- President of the Collegiate Skating And Ice Hockey Federation
- President of the Japan-Turkey Society
- President of the Middle Eastern Culture Center in Japan
- Honorary President of the Japan Rugby Football Union
- Honorary President of the Japan-British Society
- Honorary President of the Norway-Japan Society

== Ancestry ==
Ancestors of Prince Tomohito of Mikasa

8. Mutsuhito, Emperor Meiji (1852–1912)
4. Yoshihito, Emperor Taishō (1879–1926)
9. Lady Naruko Yanagihara (1879–1943)
2. Takahito, Prince Mikasa (1915–2016)
10. Prince Michitaka Kujō (1839–1906)
5. Lady Sadako Kujō (1884–1951)
11. Ikuko Noma
1. Prince Tomohito of Mikasa
12. Viscount Masayoshi Takagi, 13th Lord of Tan'an (1853–1920)
6. Viscount Masanari Takagi (1894–1948)
13. Saneko Matsudaira (1858–1927)
3. The Hon. Yuriko Takagi (b. 1923)
14. Viscount Tamemori Irie (1868–1936)
7. Hon. Kuniko Irie (1901–1988)
15. Lady Nobuko Yanagihara (1876–1953)

=== Patrilineal descent ===
Patrilineal descent

Imperial House of Japan

1. Descent prior to Keitai is unclear to modern historians, but traditionally traced back patrilineally to Emperor Jimmu
2. Emperor Keitai, ca. 450–534
3. Emperor Kinmei, 509–571
4. Emperor Bidatsu, 538–585
5. Prince Oshisaka, ca. 556–???
6. Emperor Jomei, 593–641
7. Emperor Tenji, 626–671
8. Prince Shiki, ???–716
9. Emperor Kōnin, 709–786
10. Emperor Kanmu, 737–806
11. Emperor Saga, 786–842
12. Emperor Ninmyō, 810–850
13. Emperor Kōkō, 830–867
14. Emperor Uda, 867–931
15. Emperor Daigo, 885–930
16. Emperor Murakami, 926–967
17. Emperor En'yū, 959–991
18. Emperor Ichijō, 980–1011
19. Emperor Go-Suzaku, 1009–1045
20. Emperor Go-Sanjō, 1034–1073
21. Emperor Shirakawa, 1053–1129
22. Emperor Horikawa, 1079–1107
23. Emperor Toba, 1103–1156
24. Emperor Go-Shirakawa, 1127–1192
25. Emperor Takakura, 1161–1181
26. Emperor Go-Toba, 1180–1239
27. Emperor Tsuchimikado, 1196–1231
28. Emperor Go-Saga, 1220–1272
29. Emperor Go-Fukakusa, 1243–1304
30. Emperor Fushimi, 1265–1317
31. Emperor Go-Fushimi, 1288–1336
32. Emperor Kōgon, 1313–1364
33. Emperor Sukō, 1334–1398
34. Prince Yoshihito Fushimi, 1351–1416
35. Prince Sadafusa Fushimi, 1372–1456
36. Emperor Go-Hanazono, 1419–1471
37. Emperor Go-Tsuchimikado, 1442–1500
38. Emperor Go-Kashiwabara, 1464–1526
39. Emperor Go-Nara, 1495–1557
40. Emperor Ōgimachi, 1517–1593
41. Prince Masahito, 1552–1586
42. Emperor Go-Yōzei, 1572–1617
43. Emperor Go-Mizunoo, 1596–1680
44. Emperor Reigen, 1654–1732
45. Emperor Higashiyama, 1675–1710
46. Prince Naohito Kanin, 1704–1753
47. Prince Sukehito Kanin, 1733–1794
48. Emperor Kōkaku, 1771–1840
49. Emperor Ninkō, 1800–1846
50. Emperor Kōmei, 1831–1867
51. Emperor Meiji, 1852–1912
52. Emperor Taishō, 1879–1926
53. Takahito, Prince Mikasa
54. Prince Tomohito of Mikasa
