= Hiroo, Shibuya =

District located in Shibuya, Tokyo, Japan

Hiroo 広尾
- Major district of Special ward
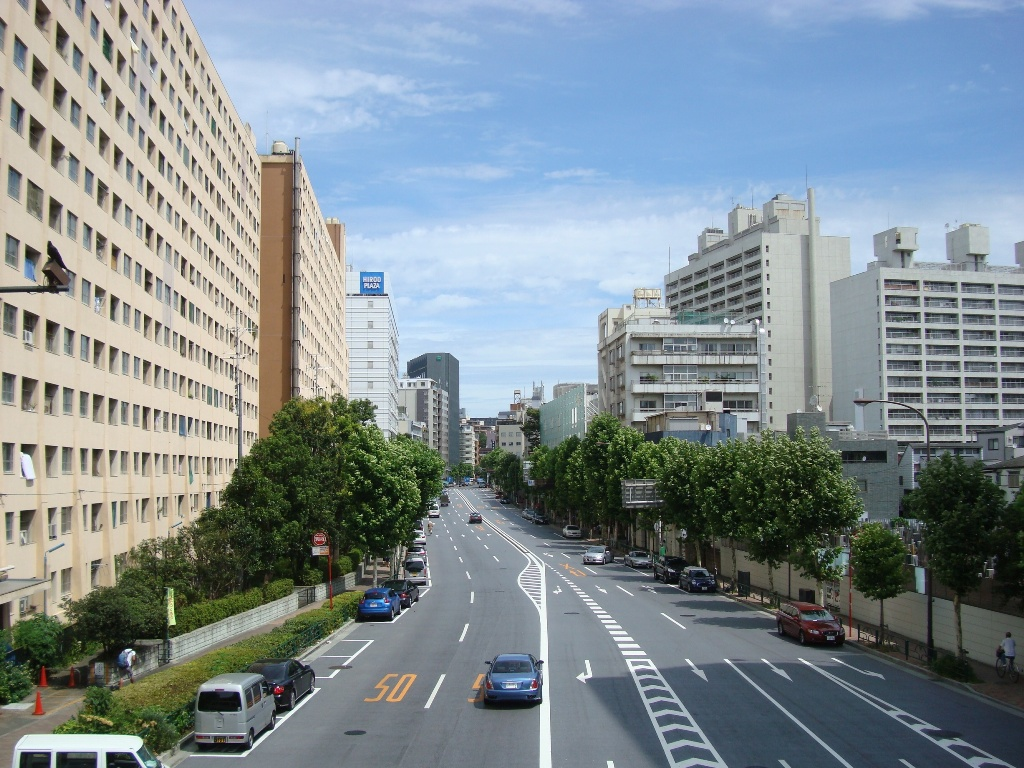
- Gaien Nishi-Dori Ave
- Interactive map of Hiroo
- Coordinates: 35°39′09″N 139°43′03″E
- Country: Japan
- Prefecture: Tokyo
- Special ward: Shibuya

Population (1 October 2020)
  - Total: 15,263
- Time zone: UTC+09:00
- ZIP code: 150-0012
- Telephone area code: 03

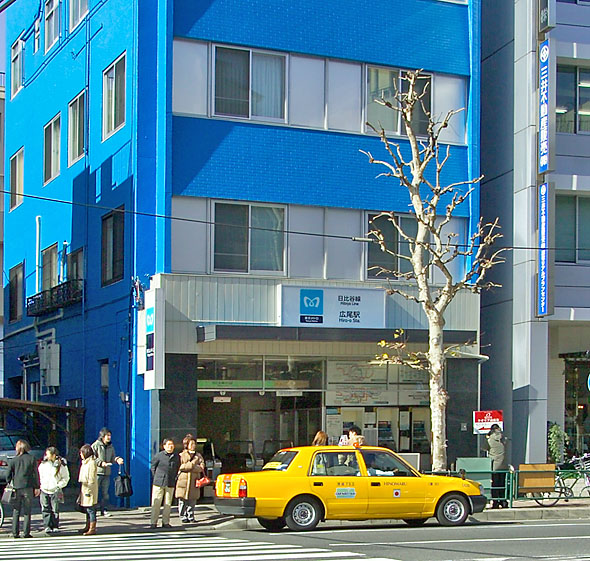
Hiroo Station Entrance

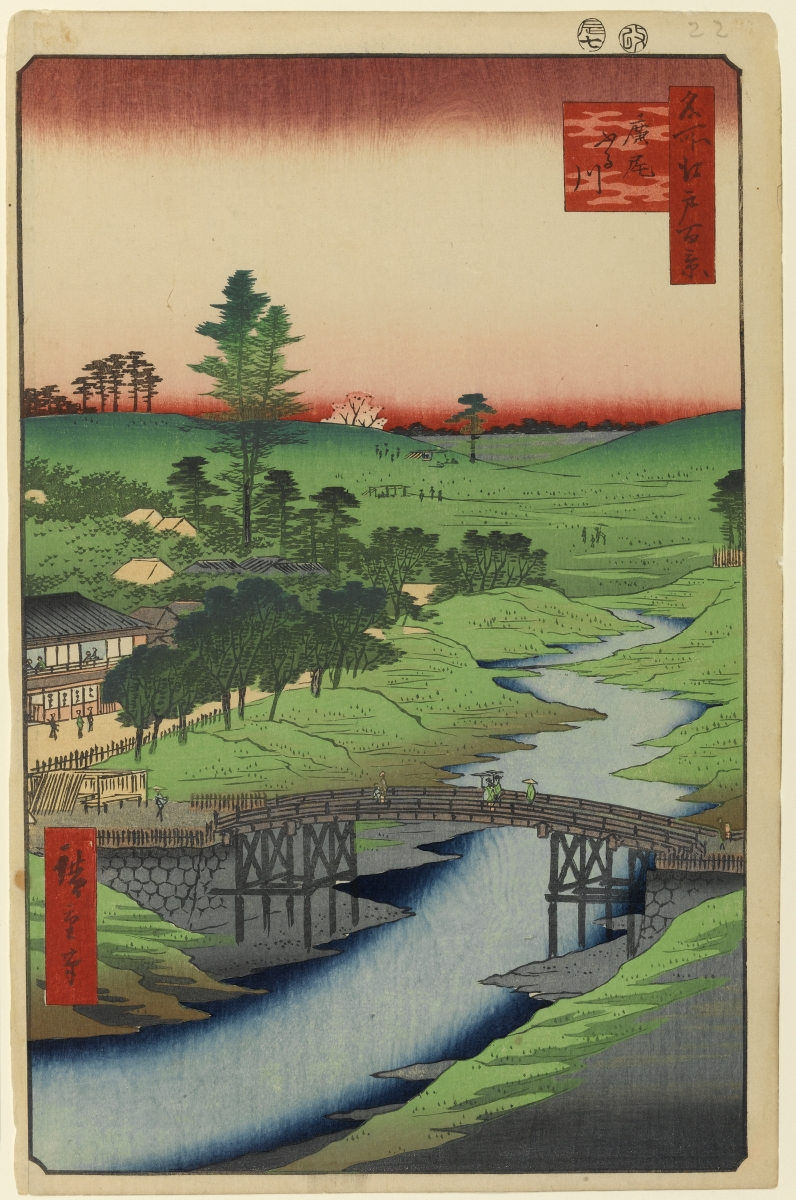
Hiroo in the Edo period

Hiroo (広尾) is a district of Shibuya, Tokyo, Japan. Abutting Ebisu, Minami-Azabu, Nishi-Azabu and Minami-Aoyama, Hiroo is an upmarket residential and shopping neighborhood in central Tokyo.

As of October, 2020, the population of this district is 15,263. The postal code for Hiroo is 150-0012.

According to the Ministry of Land, Infrastructure and Transport, as of 2020, the residential land prices on Hiroo 2-chōme and 3-chōme are as high as ¥1,350,000/m^{2} and ¥1,260,000/m^{2}, respectively.

Located on Minami-Azabu, the Hiroo Station of Tokyo Metro Hibiya Line is the nearest subway station to Hiroo.

== Geography ==
Hiroo is located in the southeast area of the district of Shibuya, Tokyo, Japan. The boundaries of Hiroo are Nishi-Azabu, Minato and Minami-Aoyama, Minato to the north and follows the Shibuya River along the south. Minami-Azabu, Minato is located to the east and Higashi, Shibuya is located to the west and Ebisu to the south.

== Education ==
=== Tertiary education ===
There are two universities in Hiroo. The University of the Sacred Heart, successor to the Sacred Heart Koto Senmon School which was established in 1916 and reorganized into a university with the current name in 1948, is one of the oldest women's universities in Japan. Its important alumnae include the former UN High Commissioner for Refugees Sadako Ogata and Empress of Japan Michiko. One of the two campuses of the Japanese Red Cross College of Nursing is also located in Hiroo. Although reorganized into a four-year college recently in 1986, the origin of the nursing school dates back to 1890, when nursing education was launched at the Japanese Red Cross Hospital. The university offers education to women in Japanese.

=== Primary and secondary schools ===
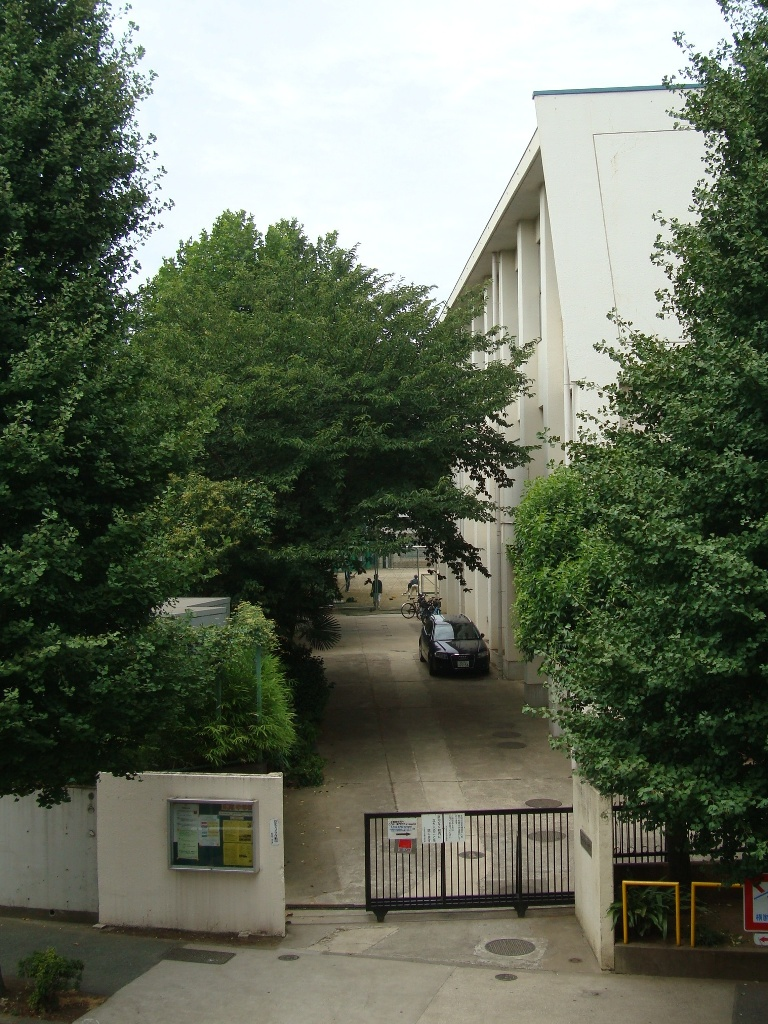
Hiroo Junior High School (広尾中学校)

Shibuya Board of Education operates public elementary and junior high schools.

Hiroo 1-chome 1-8 and 11-16 ban, 2-chome 1-9 ban, and 3-chome 2-3 and 8-17 ban are zoned to Hiroo Elementary School (広尾小学校). Hiroo 4-5 chome, 1-chome 9-10 ban, and 2-chome 10-22 ban are zoned to Rinsen Elementary School (臨川小学校). Hiroo 3-chome 1 and 4-7-ban are zoned to Tokiwamatsu Elementary School (常磐松小学校).

Hiroo 1-2 and 4-5 chome and 3-chome 2, 3, and 8-17 ban are zoned to Hiroo Junior High School (広尾中学校). Hiroo 3-chome 1 and 4-7 ban are zoned to Hachiyama Junior High School (鉢山中学校).

Schools in Hiroo:

- Hiroo Elementary School (Hiroo Shōgakkō)
- Rinsen Elementary School, a public elementary school.
- Tokyo Jogakkan Elementary, Junior and Senior High School, a private girls school.
- Keio Gijyuku Yōchisha, a private elementary school, affiliated with Keio University. It is located in Tengenji Bridge (Tengenji-Bashi).
- Hiroo is also home to the International School of the Sacred Heart which was founded in 1908 and is located on the same grounds as the University of the Sacred Heart (Seishin Joshi Daigaku). It offers education in English for girls from the ages of three to eighteen.
- There are several Japanese high schools in the area as well, including Hiroo Senior High School (Hiroo Kōtōgakkō)
- The Rainbow International Montessori School also has a facility located in the same area.
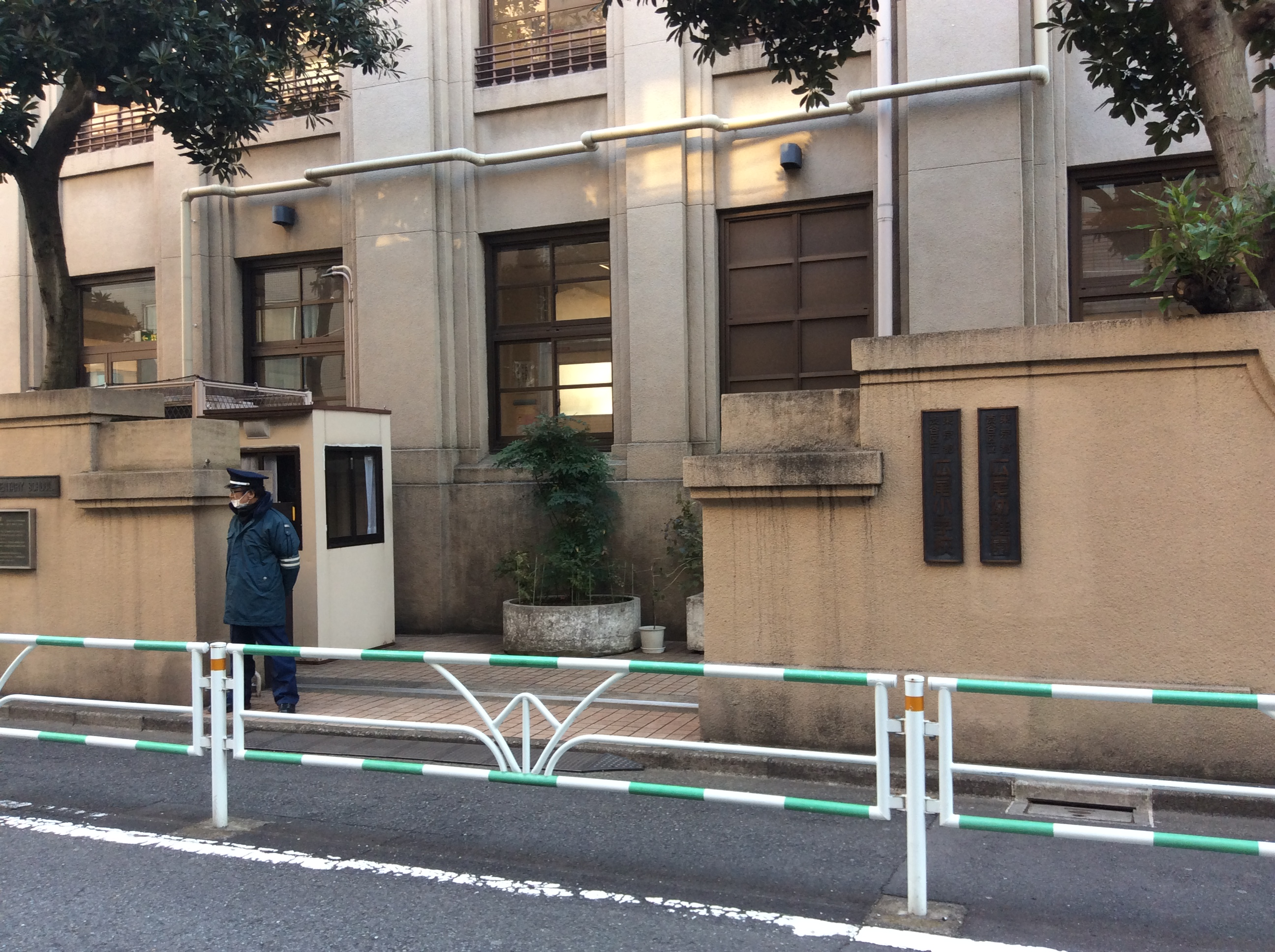
Hiroo Elementary School (広尾小学校)

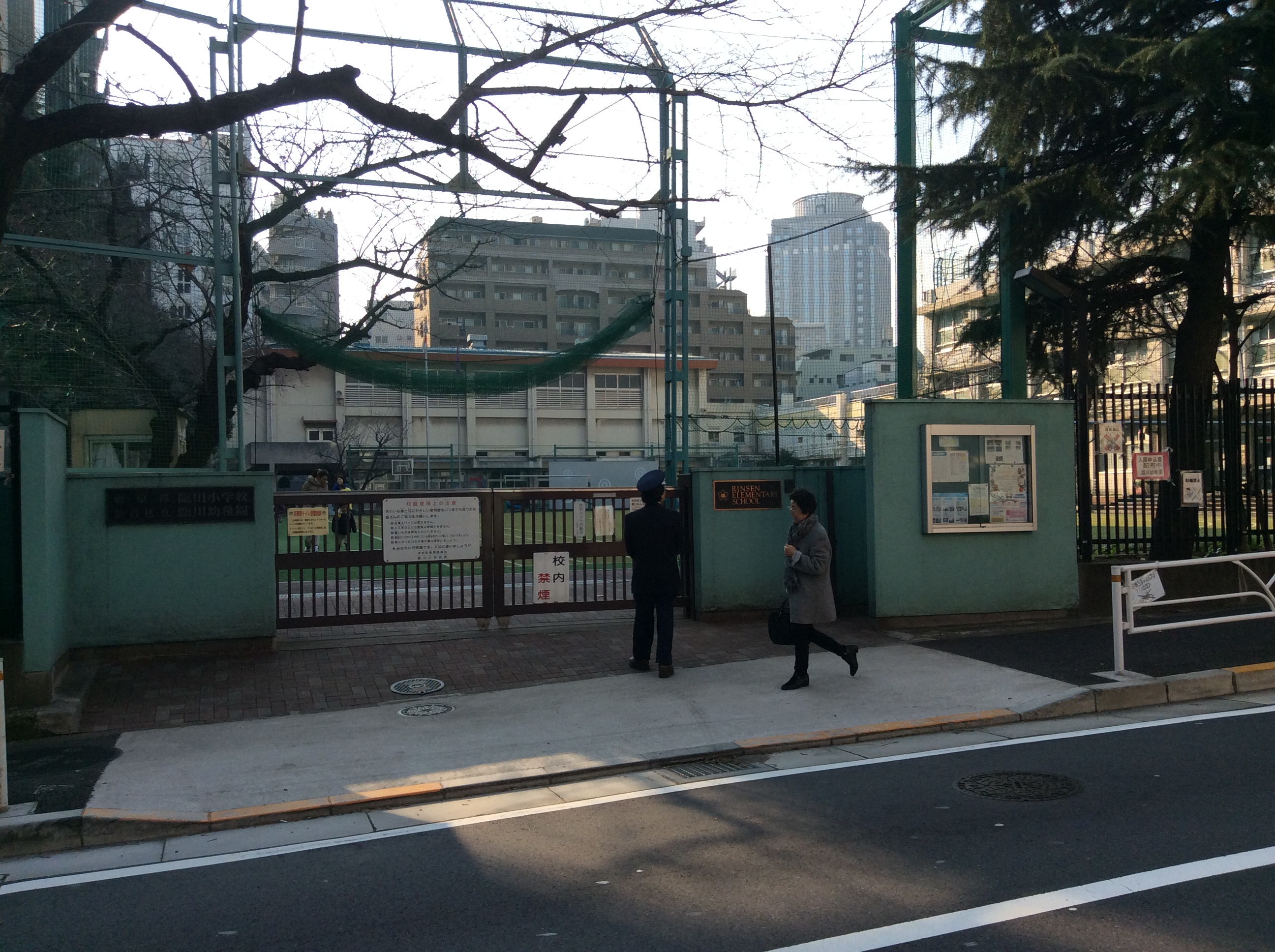
Rinsen Elementary School (臨川小学校)

== Demography ==
Population of Hiroo by Chōme (October 1, 2020)
District	Number of Households	Total Population	Male	Female
Hiroo 1-chōme	1,833	2,889	1,344	1,545
Hiroo 2-chōme	903	1,936	914	1,022
Hiroo 3-chōme	1,436	2,995	1,386	1,609
Hiroo 4-chōme	2,291	4,262	1,756	2,506
Hiroo 5-chōme	2079	3181	1360	1821
Total	8,592	15,263	6,760	8,503

Population Trend of Hiroo District
Year	Total Population
2011	13,101
2012	13,228
2013	14,386
2014	14,552
2015	15,248
2016	15,355
2017	15,310
2018	15,295
2019	15,381
2020 (October 1)	15,263

Population Trends of Hiroo by Citizenship and Sex
Year	Total Population	Female Population	Male Population	Japanese Population	Non-Japanese Population
2015	15,248	8,498	6,750	14,241	1,007
2016	15,355	8,566	6,769	14,362	993
2017	15,310	8,588	6,722	14,316	994
2018	15,295	8,567	6,728	14,321	974
2019	15,381	8,622	6,759	14,337	1,044
2020 (October 1)	15,263	8,503	6,760	14,248	1,015

== Attractions ==
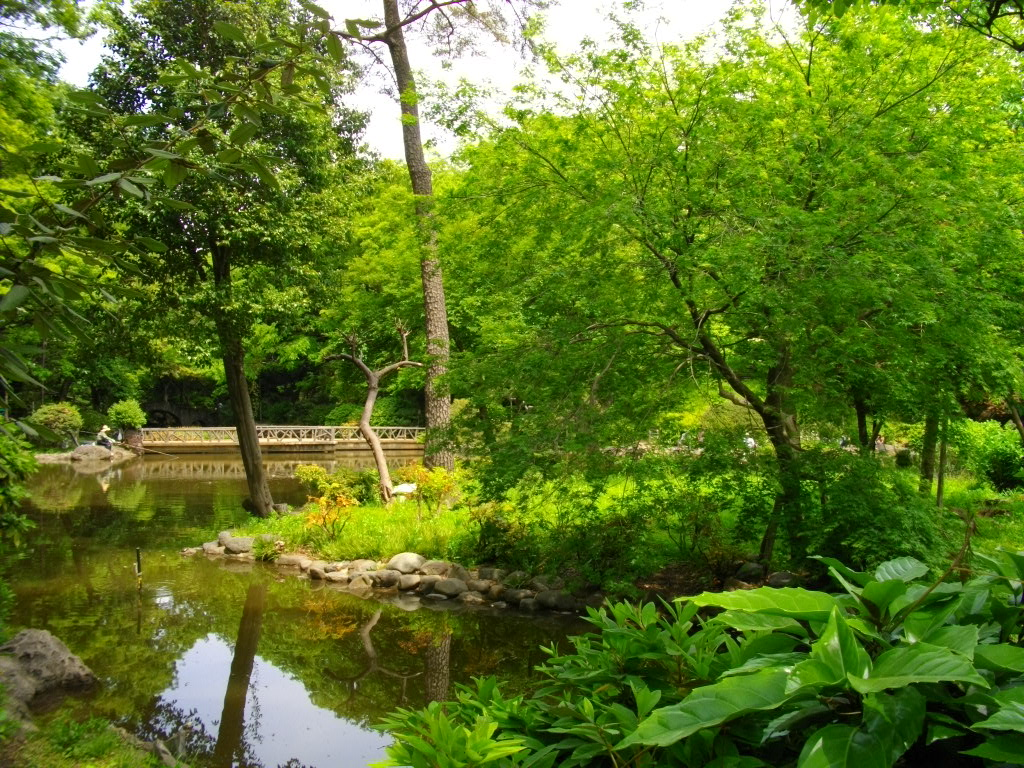
Arisugawa Park

Embassy of Peru, Tokyo

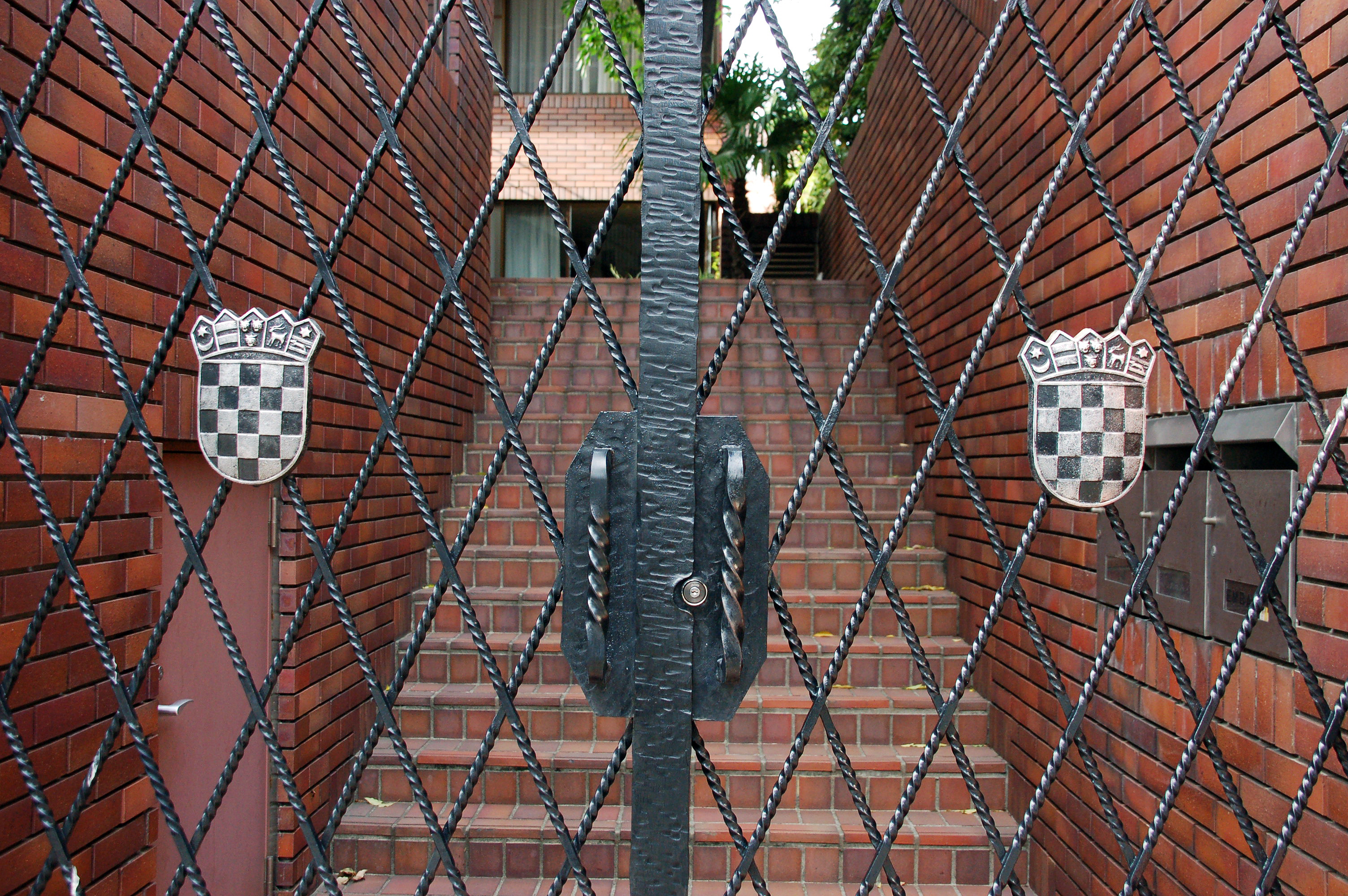
The Gate of Embassy of Croatia in Japan

Adjacent to Hiroo, the district of Minami-Azabu is home to Arisugawa Park, which spans through a large chunk of the town. The park consists of several paths and walkways, a baseball field, soccer field, children's amusement areas and a man-made waterfall that empties into a pond full of koi and ducks. The park is situated in the close vicinity of Hiroo Station, causing it to be often incorrectly regarded as "a park in Hiroo."

== Foreign embassies ==
Hiroo is home to several embassies: Embassy of Peru, Croatia, Czech Republic, Burkina Faso, Tajikistan, Congo, and Oman. Hiroo Station is the nearest subway station to several prominent embassies in Minato: Embassy of France, Germany, Norway, Pakistan and the EU.

== New Sanno Hotel ==
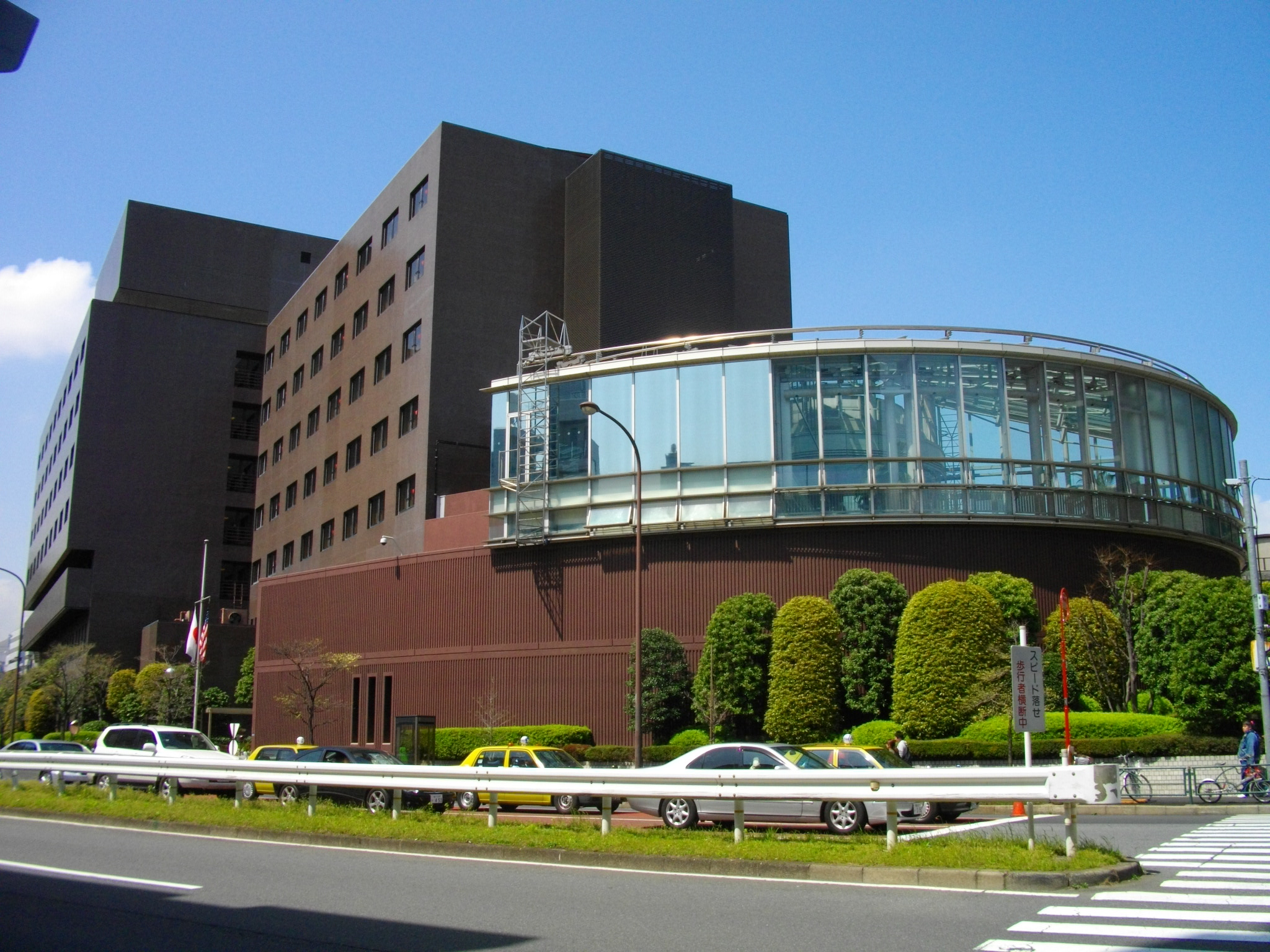
New Sanno Hotel

The New Sanno Hotel is a short-term accommodation facility operated by the U.S. Navy. While the hotel technically is located in Minami-Azabu, it is nearby the Hiroo subway station and Tengenji Bridge. The hotel opened in 1983 after moving from a location nearby Akasaka Mitsuke Station. The large number of daily visitors to the hotel contributes to the international atmosphere in Hiroo.

== Tsukushigahara ==
In the Edo period, the area near present-day Tokyo Metropolitan Hiroo Hospital, Keio Gijyuku Yochisha School, Tengenji Bridge, and Tokyo Metropolitan Hiroo 5-chome Apartments was named Tsukushigahara. At the time, this area was a large flatland of susuki grass (miscanthus sinensis). Tsukushigahara was a popular strolling and play area and was recorded in the Illustrated Collection of Famous Places in Edo (江戸名所図会).

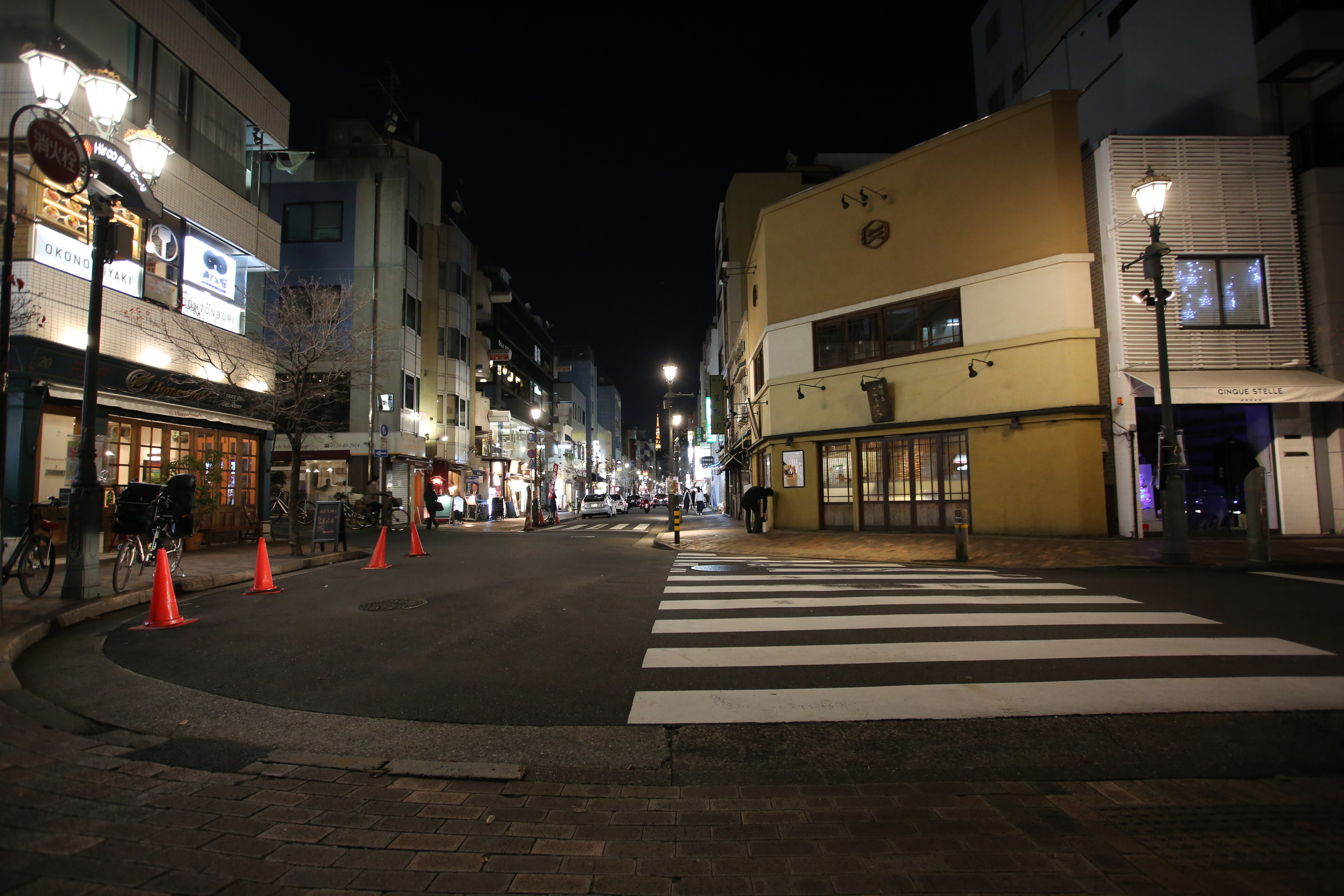
Hiroo 5-chome Shopping Street Town

== Hiroo 5-chome Shopping Street Town ==
The area surrounding the present-day Hiroo 5-chome shopping street town was designated a shopping street town in Shotoku 3 (1713). This area survived the destruction of the Bombing of Tokyo in 1944-1945. As a result, many Meiji period and Taisho period buildings can still be found in the area. The area is locally known for its nostalgic atmosphere.

== Tengenji Bridge ==
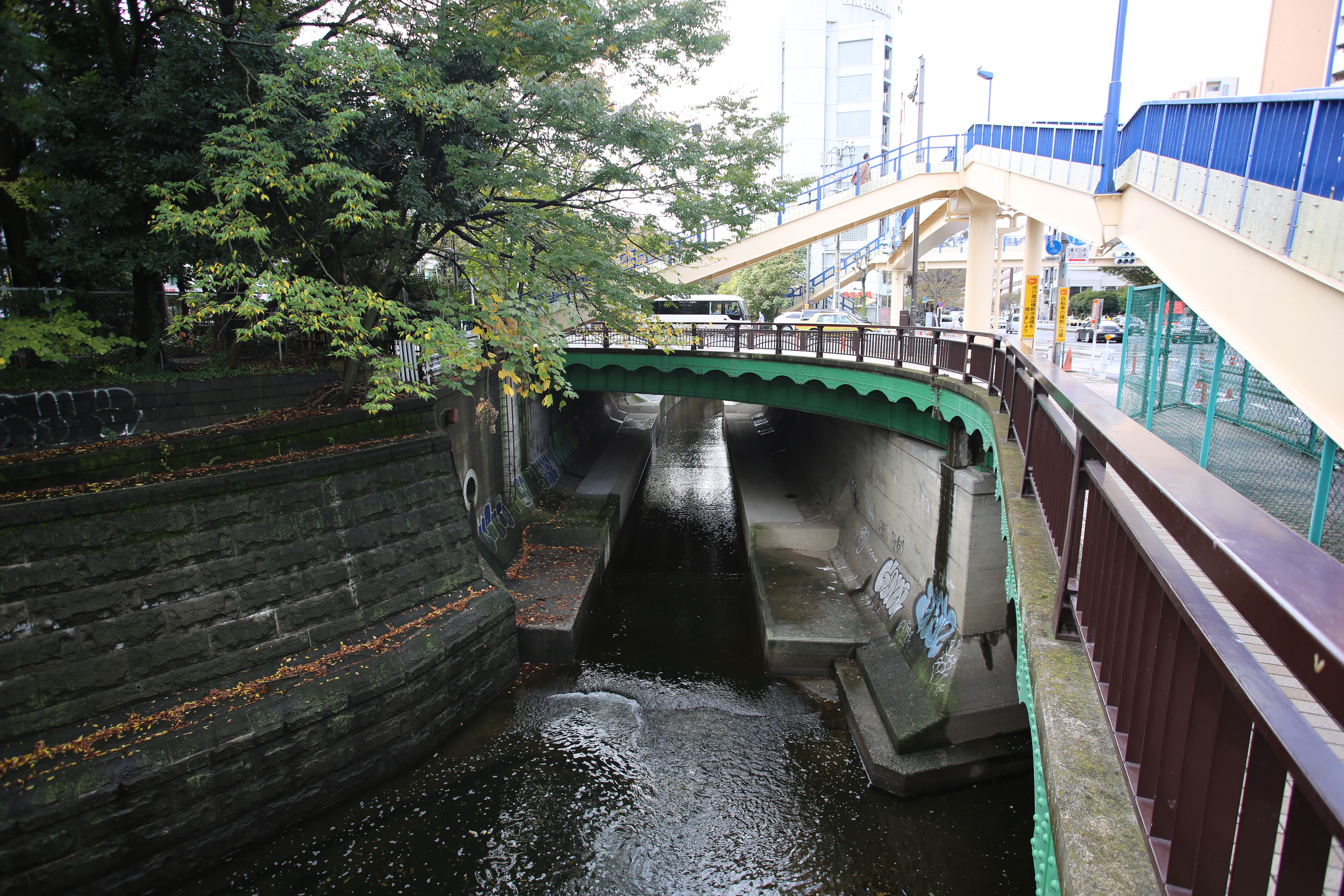
Tengenji Bridge, Hiroo, Tokyo, Japan

Tengenji Bridge (天現寺橋) is located at the intersection of Gaien-Nishi-dori and Meiji-dori in Hiroo 5-chome. The bridge spans the confluence of the Shibuya River and the Kogai River. The Kogai River flows completely underground since it was covered by concrete. The Kogai River flows under Gaien-Nishi Dori upstream towards and past the east side of Aoyama Cemetery. Two springs known to still flow into the Kogai River are located at the ponds of Arisugawa Park and the ponds at the Nezu Museum. The Tengenji Bridge is an old bridge and existed long before it was mentioned in a text named Gofunaienkakuzsho (御府内沿革図書) published in Bunkyu 3 (1863).

== Facilities ==
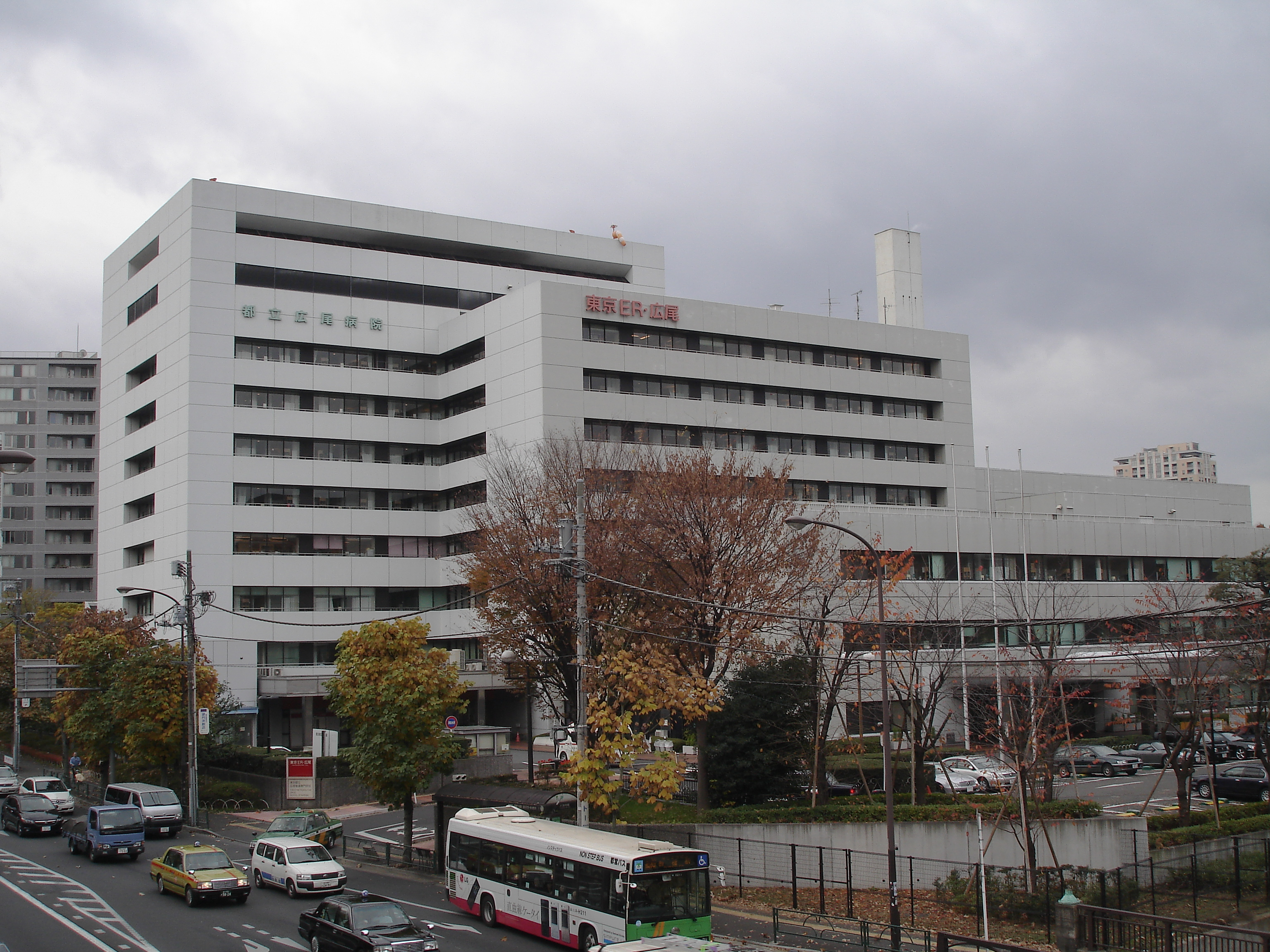
Tokyo Metropolitan Hiroo Hospital

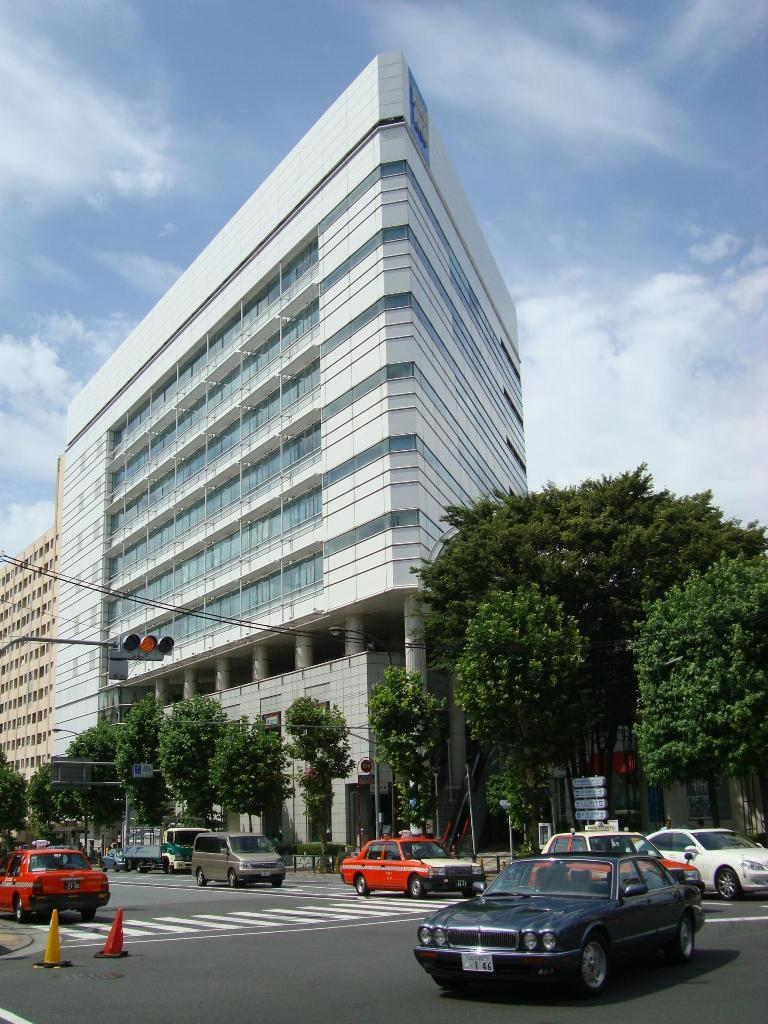
Hiroo Plaza

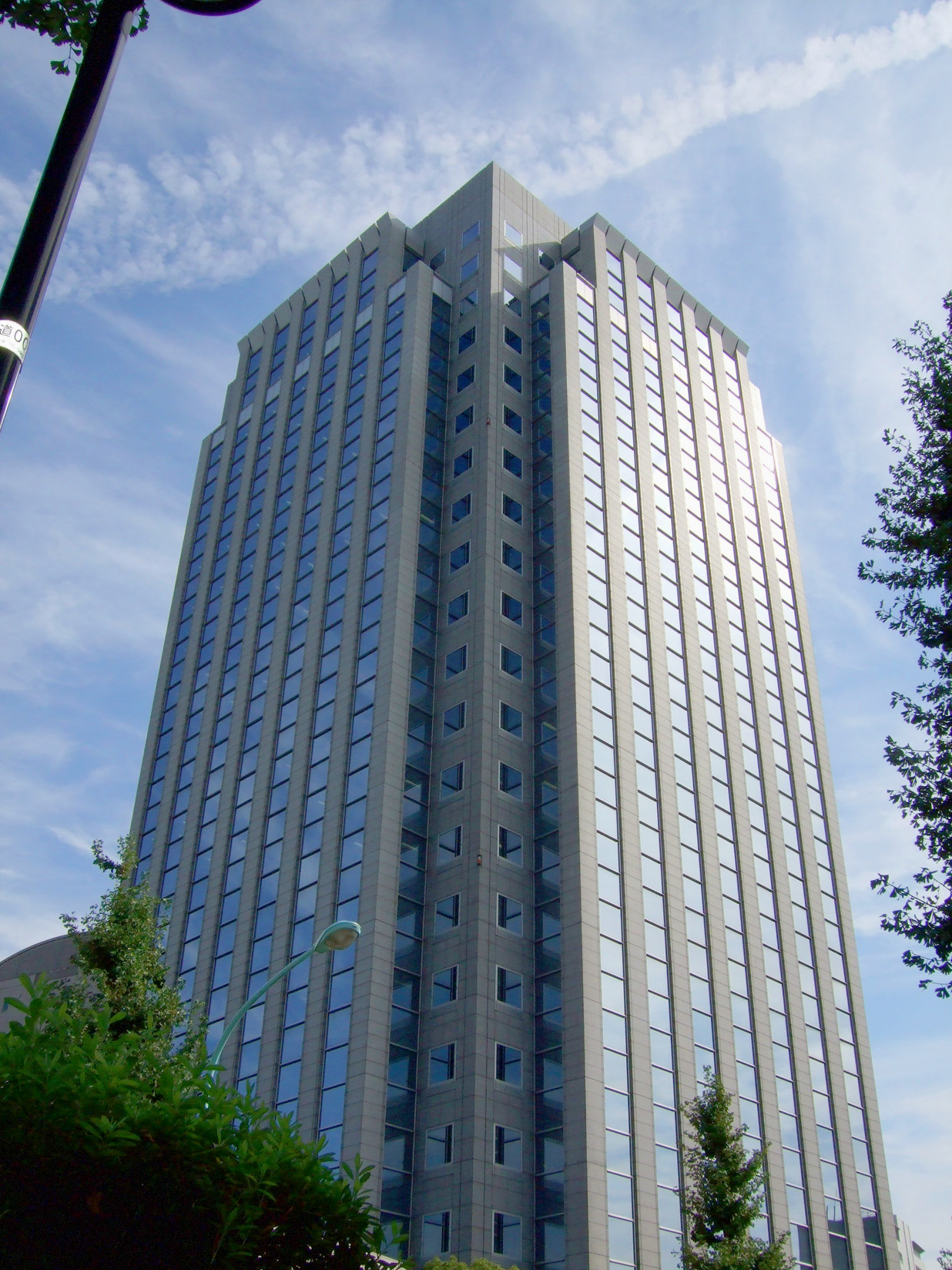
Ebisu Prime Square

- Tokyo Metropolitan Hiroo Hospital, located in Ebisu.
- Japanese Red Cross Medical Center
- Aiiku Hospital, located in Minami-Azabu.
- Japanese Red Cross College of Nursing
- University of the Sacred Heart (Japan)
- International School of the Sacred Heart
- Arisugawa-no-miya Memorial Park, located in Minami-Azabu.
- Tokyo Metropolitan Central Library, located at the center of the Arisugawa-no-miya Memorial Park in Minami-Azabu.
- Embassy of Croatia
- Embassy of Czech Republic
- Embassy of Burkina Faso
- Embassy of Oman
- Embassy of Peru
- Ebasssy of Tajikistan
- Embassy of Congo
- New Sanno Hotel
- Hiroo Garden Hills
- Hiroo Plaza
- Tengenji Bridge (Tengenji-Bashi)
- Yamatane Museum of Art
- Hanezawa Garden (Demolished in 2012)
- Ebisu Prime Square
