= Tokyo Metropolitan Hiroo Hospital =

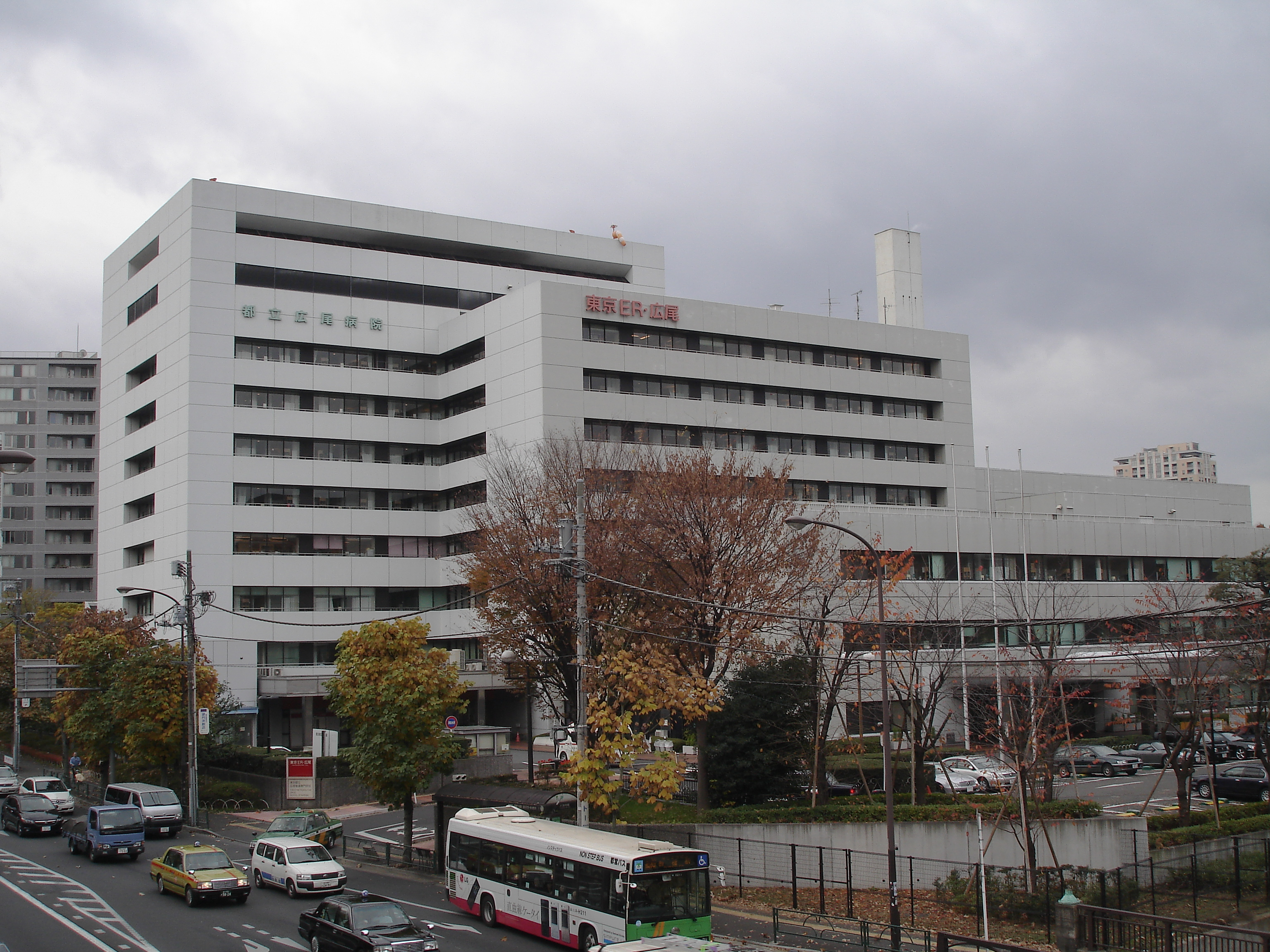
- Exterior appearance

Geography
- Location: Shibuya, Tokyo, Japan
- Coordinates: 35.6468°N 139.7217°E

Services
- Emergency department: Yes
- Beds: 426

Helipads
- Helipad: Yes

History
- Opened: 6 August 1895

Tokyo Metropolitan Hiroo Hospital (東京都立広尾病院) is a public hospital in Shibuya, Tokyo, Japan. It has 426 beds and is run by the Tokyo Metropolitan Government.

The hospital focuses on emergency and disaster medical care, cardiovascular diseases, cerebrovascular diseases, and care for residents of outlying islands near Tokyo. It also specialises in providing multi-lingual care for foreign residents of Tokyo.

== History ==
The hospital was established on 6 August 1895.

The current hospital building was built as part of a major redevelopment of the hospital completed in 1980. The rooftop heliport, commissioned in October 1980, was installed to provide medical services to isolated islands near Tokyo. The steel reinforced concrete building, with a floor area of 34,020 square metres (366,200 sq ft), was designed by Tokyo-based architecture firm K.ITO Architects and Engineers.

== Emergency services ==
The hospital specialises in emergency care, and has an accident and emergency department. The Emergency Care Centre was established in 2002. It accepts serious cases from nearby Tokyo wards, as well as the Izu and Bonin Islands. The hospital has a rooftop helipad, and accepts around 200 emergency patients by aircraft per year.

== Facilities ==
The hospital, located at 2-34-10 Ebisu, Shibuya-ku, Tokyo, occupies a site area of 22,171.62 square metres (2.217162 ha). It is located approximately 500 metres south of Hiroo Station on the Tokyo Metro Hibiya Line. The hospital complex has a variety of shops, a cafeteria, a Starbucks cafe, and a barbershop.

== Departments ==
- Cardiology
- Cardiovascular surgery
- Dentistry and oral surgery
- Dermatology
- Diabetes and endocrinology
- Emergency care
- Emergency care centre
- Gastroenterology
- Gynecology
- Hematology
- Nephrology
- Neurology
- Neuropsychiatry
- Neurosurgery
- Obstetrics and gynecology
- Ophthalmology
- Orthopedic surgery
- Otolaryngology
- Pediatric
- Plastic and reconstructive surgery
- Radiology
- Rehabilitation
- Respiratory medicine
- Surgery (gastrointestinal, breast, and respiratory surgery)
- Urology

== Services for international patients ==
According to a 2017 news article, approximately five per cent of the hospital's patients are non-Japanese. This is the highest proportion among Tokyo metropolitan hospitals.

In March 2017, it was decided to formally classify Tokyo Metropolitan Hiroo Hospital as a hospital set up to handle patients from other countries, becoming the 21st in Japan with such an designation, called the "Japan Medical Services Accreditation for International Patients", or JMIP. The hospital takes a "welcoming and flexible approach" to non-Japanese-speaking patients, and employs medical language interpreters (speaking English and Chinese) as well as a medical coordinator for international patients.

Aside from employing interpreters with medical training, the hospital also publishes informational booklets, forms, and other documents in foreign languages. It also has graphic interpretation tools for English, Chinese, Korean, Spanish, Portuguese, Thai, Russian, Vietnamese, Tagalog, and French. The internationalisation efforts were made as part of a push to improve services for non-Japanese patients at Tokyo hospitals ahead of the 2020 Olympic Games.

== See also ==
- List of hospitals in Japan
