= Shibuya River =

River in central Tokyo

Coordinates: 35.657694°N 139.702944°E

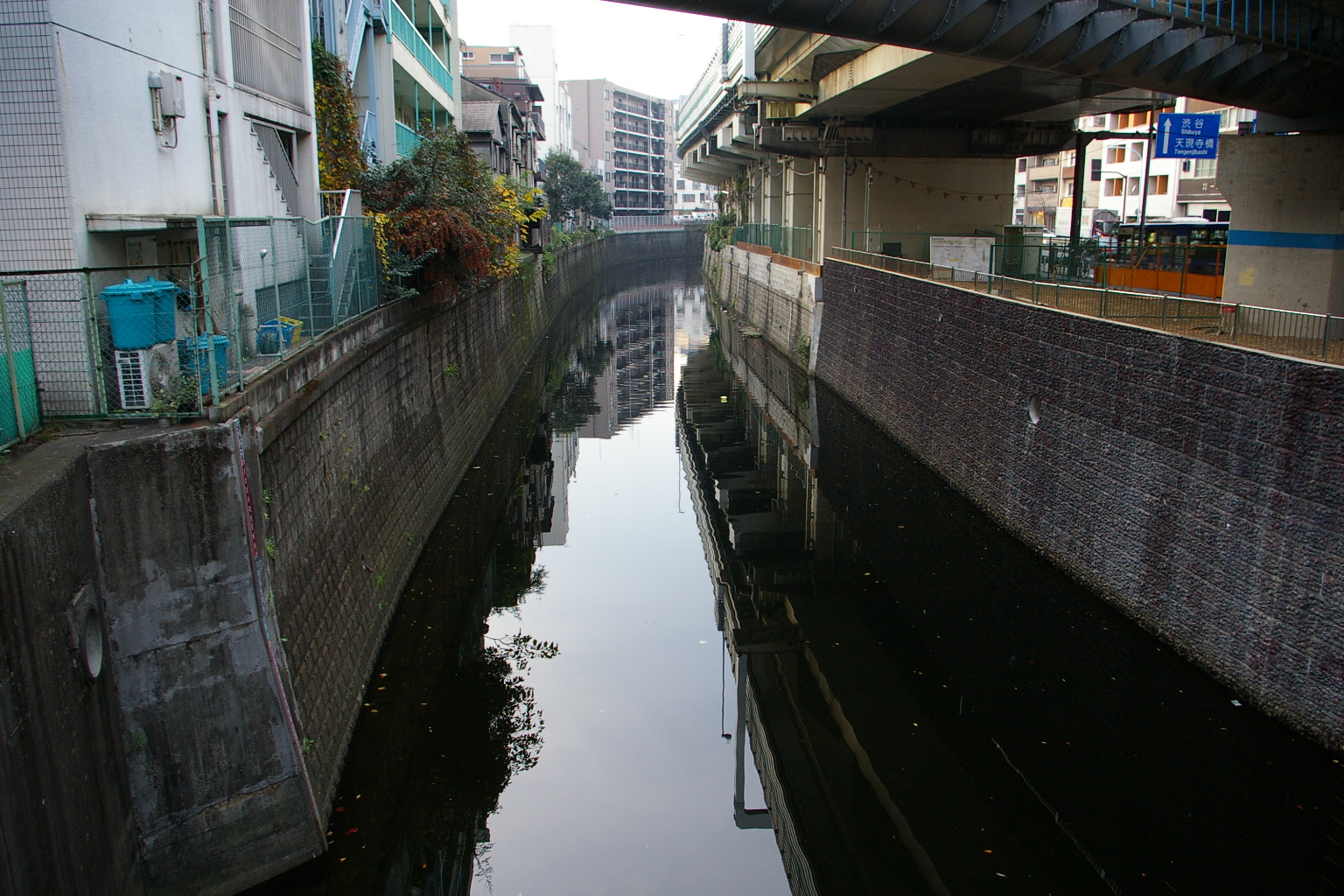

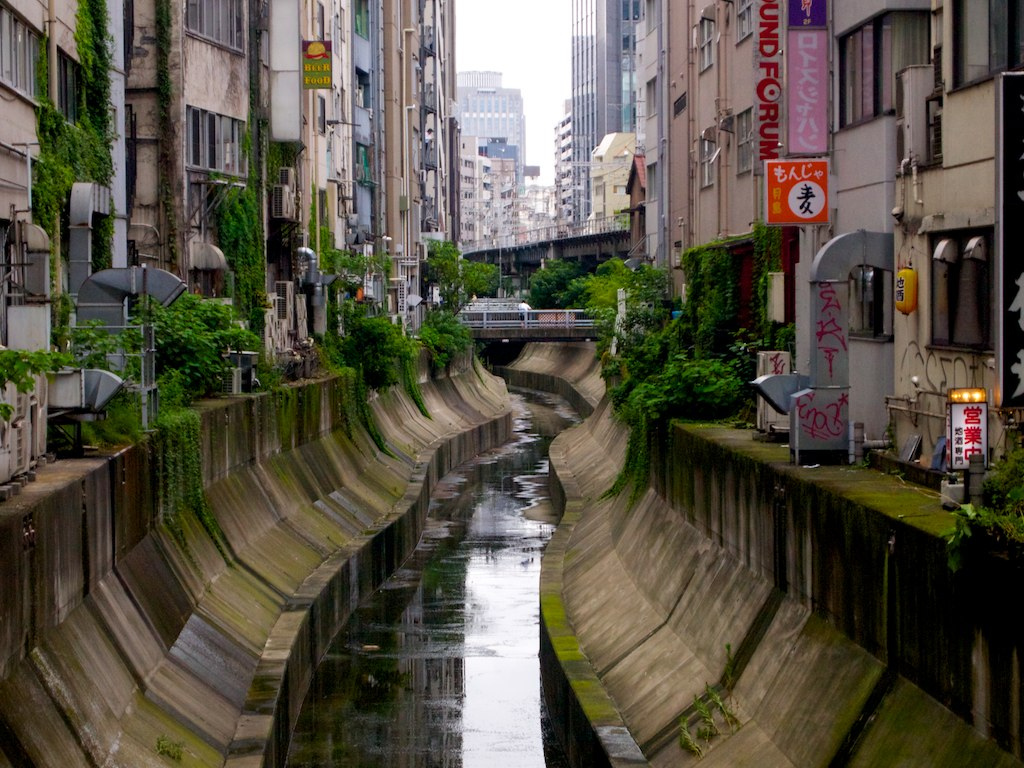
Shibuya River south of Shibuya Station

The Shibuya River (渋谷川, Shibuya-gawa) is a river which flows through central Tokyo, Japan.

The river is 2.6 km in length originating close to Shibuya Station and passing through Shibuya and Minato wards before merging with the Furu River near Hiroo and flowing into Tokyo Bay near Shiba Koen. The Inner Circular Route is built above the lower course of the river.

The majority of the Shibuya River's banks lack landscaping except for a section right next to the Shibuya Stream skyscraper and retail complex; the major tributary of the river, the Onden River, originates in Sendagaya and passes largely unnoticed directly under Cat Street in the heart of Ura-Harajuku. The Onden River merges with the Uda River in central Shibuya forming the Shibuya River which then flows directly under Shibuya Station as a covered concrete drain.

Redevelopment plans for Shibuya Station included the prospect of a more accessible Shibuya River with landscaping and pedestrian access. The redevelopment was completed in September 2018 as a part of the Shibuya Stream skyscraper and retail complex.

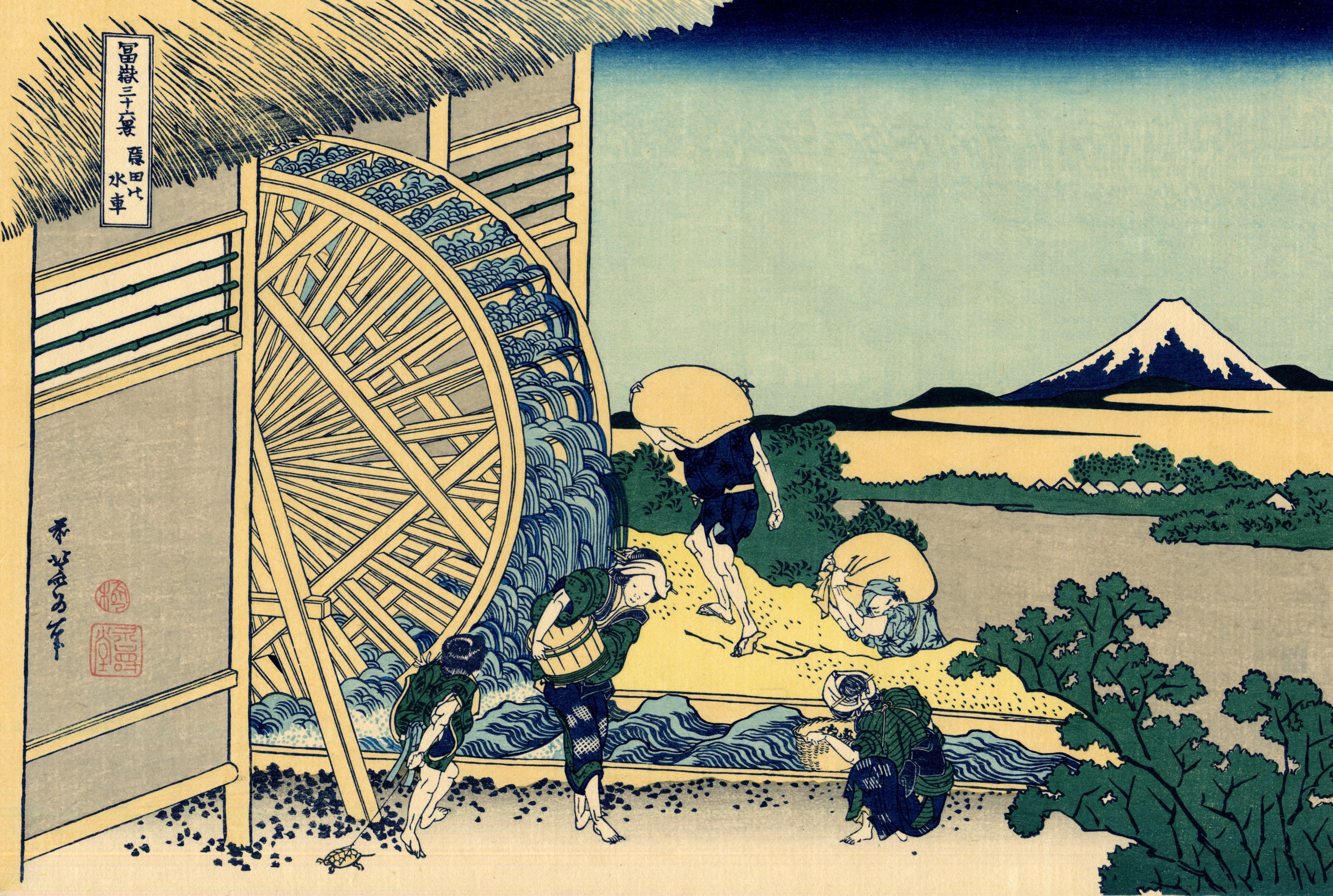
Watermill at Onden, (on the Shibuya River) by Hokusai. Part of the Thirty-six Views of Mount Fuji series.

== See also ==
- Shibuya, Tokyo
- Harajuku
