= Princess Akiko of Mikasa =

Japanese princess (born 1981)

Princess Akiko
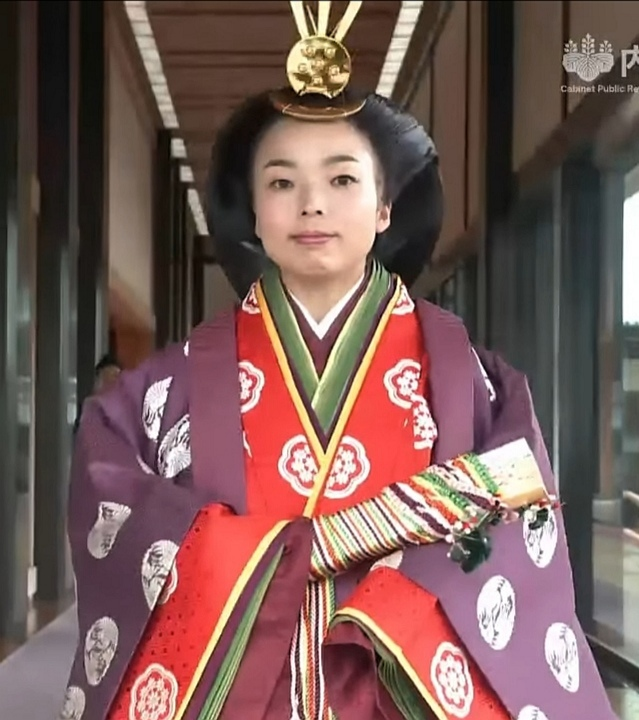
- Akiko in 2019
- Born: 20 December 1981 (age 44); Tokyo, Japan
- House: Imperial House of Japan
- Father: Prince Tomohito of Mikasa
- Mother: Nobuko Asō

Princess Akiko of Mikasa (三笠宮彬子女王, Mikasa-no-miya Akiko Joō; born 20 December 1981) is a member of the Imperial House of Japan, a paternal second cousin of Emperor Naruhito, and the elder daughter of Prince Tomohito of Mikasa and Princess Tomohito of Mikasa (Nobuko). She is also a niece of Japan's 92nd prime minister Tarō Asō (who is the older brother of her mother), a great-niece of author and literary critic Ken'ichi Yoshida, and a great-granddaughter of Japan's 45th prime minister Shigeru Yoshida.

In September 2025, Princess Akiko became the head of the Mikasa-no-miya branch of the imperial family. She is the first woman who was a princess by birth to succeed as head of a branch of the imperial family since Princess Sumiko.

== Biography ==
=== Education ===
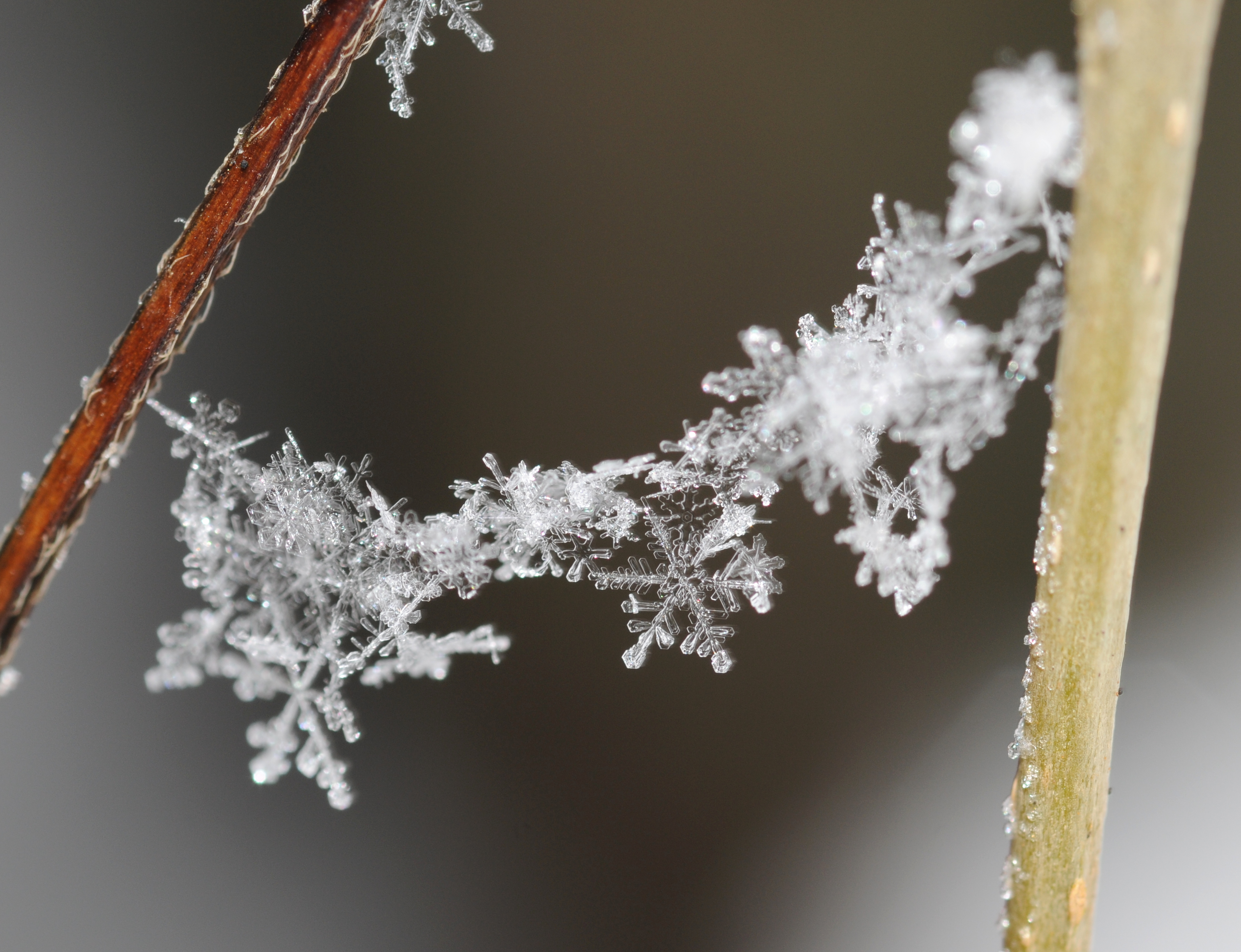
Snowflakes, designated imperial personal emblem of Akiko

Princess Akiko graduated from Gakushuin University in Tokyo with a BA degree in History. During her studies, she spent the 2001–2002 academic year abroad at Merton College, Oxford, where she studied Japanese art history with Steven Gunn, a professor of Early Modern History, who served as her academic tutor.

In 2004, she returned to the University of Oxford as a doctoral student at the Faculty of Oriental Studies. Her research focused on the William Anderson Collection at the British Museum and Western interest in Japanese art in the nineteenth century. William Anderson (1842–1900) was an English surgeon who taught anatomy and surgery in Japan and became an important scholar and collector of Japanese art. She was affiliated with Merton College, Oxford from October 2004 until she completed her final examination in January 2010. Her doctoral thesis, titled Collecting and displaying 'Japan' in Victorian Britain: the case of the British Museum, was supervised by Dame Jessica Rawson (English art historian and Merton’s first female Warden between 1994–2010) and Timothy Clark (Head of the Japanese Section at the British Museum). In 2011, she was awarded a DPhil degree in Japanese art history from Oxford, thereby becoming the second member of the Japanese imperial household to achieve a doctorate (Fumihito, Prince Akishino, was the first who earned a PhD degree in Ornithology from the Graduate University for Advanced Studies in October 1996).

In December 2006, Princess Akiko assisted the University of Tokyo in opening a special exhibition on the 19th-century art movement known as Japonism. In July 2007, she participated in a symposium at Ochanomizu University on the art collection of William Anderson. From January to May 2008, she was at the Clark Center for Japanese Art and Culture in Hanford, California doing research for her thesis.

=== Career ===
Princess Akiko worked as a postdoctoral fellow at the Kinugasa Research Organization, Ritsumeikan University in Kyoto from October 2009 to March 2012. She was appointed as a Special Invited Associate Professor at the Kinugasa Research Organization, Ritsumeikan University, from April 2012 to March 2013, and was also appointed as a visiting associate professor at the same organization from April 2013 to March 2014, and again as a visiting researcher in May 2014. Akiko was inaugurated as the visiting researcher at the Hosei University Research Center for International Japanese Studies in May 2012. She was inaugurated as the president of Shinyusha, General Incorporated Association in April 2013. She was appointed as a Guest Research Fellow at the Archival Research Center of Kyoto City University of Arts in April 2014 and was inaugurated as the president of the Ski Instructors Association of Japan in the same month. She is also the president of the Middle Eastern Culture Center in Japan. Princess Akiko has also worked as a guest professor at Kyoto City University of Arts. Other positions held by her include: research fellow at the Institute of Japanese Culture at Kyoto Sangyo University, visiting fellow at the Global Exchange Organisation for Research and Education (GEORE) of Gakushuin University, and special guest professor in Kokugakuin University.

=== Public appearances ===
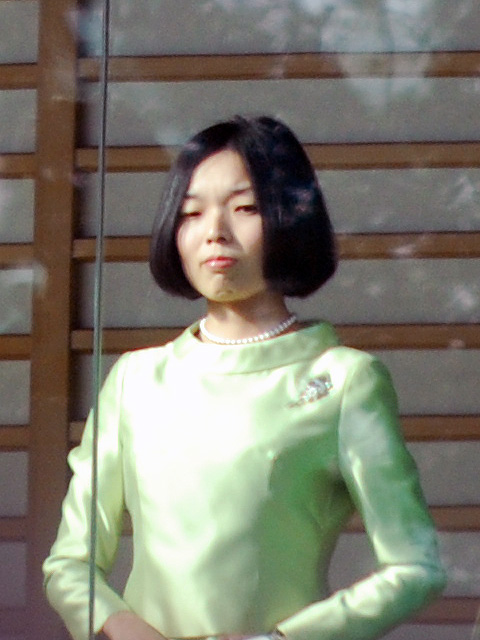
At the Chōwaden Reception Hall (2 January 2012)

In July 1998, Princess Akiko paid a visit to Turkey for the first time. The trip was done under the arrangement of the Middle Eastern Culture Center, an organisation associated with her grandfather. During the trip the Princess viewed the remains of Kaman-Kalehöyük alongside many other sites. Princess Akiko came of age in December 2001 and started attending official ceremonies and events in Japan with the other members of the Imperial Family.

In June 2003, Princess Akiko went on a tour of the heritage of Turkey that her father had planned.

In July 2010, she also visited "the Dedication Ceremony of the Museum of Archaeology Kaman-Kalehöyük, Japanese Institute of Anatolian Archaeology". In January 2011, she went to Austria. The main purpose of this trip was attending the 19th INTERSKI Congress held in St. Anton.

On 4 September 2013, Princess Akiko departed for Argentina to meet with members of International Olympic Committee, where members wanted to elect the host city for the 2020 Summer Olympics, with candidates being Madrid, Istanbul and Tokyo. Princess Akiko and Princess Takamado were part of the Japanese delegation, supporting Tokyo's successful Olympic bid. On 6 September, Princess Akiko toured a Japanese garden in Buenos Aires with the president of Argentina's Japanese Cultural Foundation, Kazunori Kosaka.

She also made an official visit to Chile from 7 to 12 September 2013. During her stay, Princess Akiko met with President Sebastián Piñera and toured Easter Island. Princess Akiko visited University of Santiago for a conference and conversation with the students of Japanese translation and linguistics. She visited Valparaíso Viña Viu Manent to learn more about Chilean wine, which is popular in Japan.

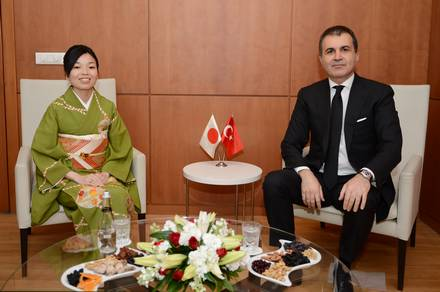
Princess Akiko meeting Ömer Çelik, Minister of Culture and Tourism, in Turkey on 27 April 2014

From 23 to 30 April 2014, Princess Akiko visited Turkey. On 27 April, the Princess attended the memorial concert for Prince Tomohito held by the Turkish government. Princess Akiko was named president of the Japan-Turkey Society, a post formerly held by Prince Tomohito.

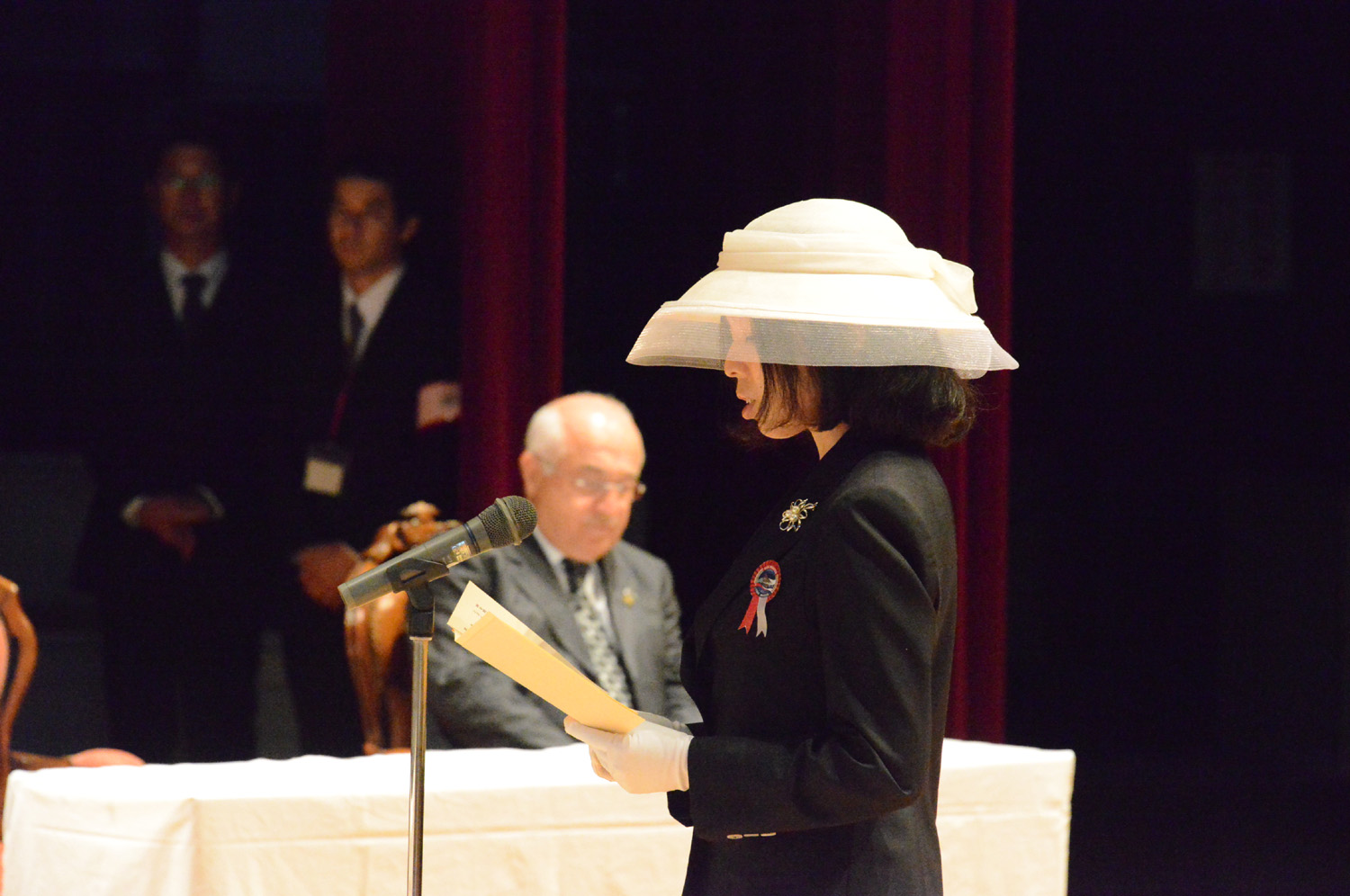
Princess Akiko attending the ceremony to commemorate victims of the Frigate Ertuğrul Disaster at Kushimoto Town Cultural Center in Kushimoto, Wakayama, on 3 June 2015

In September 2018, the Princess undertook a tour of Turkey, during which she met with Turkish officials and visited archaeological sites and museums in Istanbul, Ankara, and Kırşehir. She was also appointed as the honorary president of Prince Mikasa Foundation, an institution founded in 2017 to provide support for the Japanese Institute of Anatolian Archaeology.

On September 17, 2025, Turkish First Lady Emine Erdoğan hosted Princess Akiko in Ankara, discussing environmental protection, cultural heritage, and gastronomy. Erdoğan praised archaeological excavations led by the Japanese Institute of Anatolian Archaeology under the Turkish Culture and Tourism Ministry, notably at Şanlıurfa's Ayanlar Ruins. Princess Akiko emphasized their role in cultural exchange, symbolized by her Turkish filigree brooch and nail polish with Turkish and Japanese flags. She also visited Anıtkabir and “The Golden Age of Archaeology” exhibition.

On September 19, 2025, an event was held with Princess Akiko, leaders from Chiba Institute of Technology, and Turkey, to announce the start of a new excavation survey at the Ayanlar Höyük site in Şanlıurfa Province, Republic of Turkey. The excavation is a collaboration between Chiba Institute of Technology and Anatolian Archaeology. As part of the event, a groundbreaking ceremony was held by the Turkish Ministry of Culture and Tourism. The project focuses on a turning point in human history about 12,000 years ago.

=== Household ===
On 6 June 2012, Prince Tomohito died from multiple organ failure. His funeral and ceremony was hosted by Princess Akiko. In June 2013 in a statement about the Prince's household, it was announced by the Imperial Household Agency that "it [had] reduced the number of households in the Imperial family by one", integrating it into the household led by his father. According to the agency's officials the household integration would not have any effect on the lives of the widow and daughters of Prince Tomohito. In September 2025 and subsequent to the death of her grandmother, Princess Mikasa, Akiko assumed the leadership of the Mikasa branch of the imperial family, becoming the first princess of the blood royal to head a household in 144 years, since Princess Sumiko was the head of Katsura-no-miya. A separate household was established for Akiko's mother.

=== Health ===
On 6 December 2013, Emperor Akihito and Empress Michiko returned from their visit to India and the Imperial Family gathered at Haneda Airport to greet them. At the airport, Princess Akiko collapsed and was taken to Keio University Hospital where was diagnosed with cerebral anemia. Her trip to Hawaii was canceled afterwards.

In 2017, she was reported to have visited Kyoto Prefectural University of Medicine's hospital in Kyoto due to asthma and high fever.

At the end of July 2022, Princess Akiko was admitted to Kyoto Prefectural University of Medicine Hospital in Kyoto due to an asthma attack. It was discovered, however, that she had COVID-19 and her symptoms were described as muscle aches and fever.

== Honours ==
Mon of the Mikasa branch of the Imperial Family

=== National honours ===
- Member 2nd Class (Peony) of the Order of the Precious Crown -

=== Honorary degrees ===
- 2018: Honorary Doctor of Letters from the Kokushikan University
- 2024: Honorary Degree of Doctor from the Chiba Institute of Technology
- 2025: Honorary Doctorate in Art History from the Ankara University

=== Honorary positions ===
- Honorary Patron of the Japan-British Society
- President of the Japan-Turkey Society
- Honorary Patron of Japan Rugby Football Union
- Honorary President of the Classics Day Prize Committee
- President of Shinyusha, General Incorporated Association
- President of the Professional Ski Instructors Association of Japan
- President of the Middle Eastern Culture Center in Japan
- President of the Prince Mikasa Foundation
- President of Ichimura Foundation for New Technology
- Honorary Chairman of Kokka Seiwakai
