= Japanese Red Cross Medical Center =

- Japanese Red Cross Society
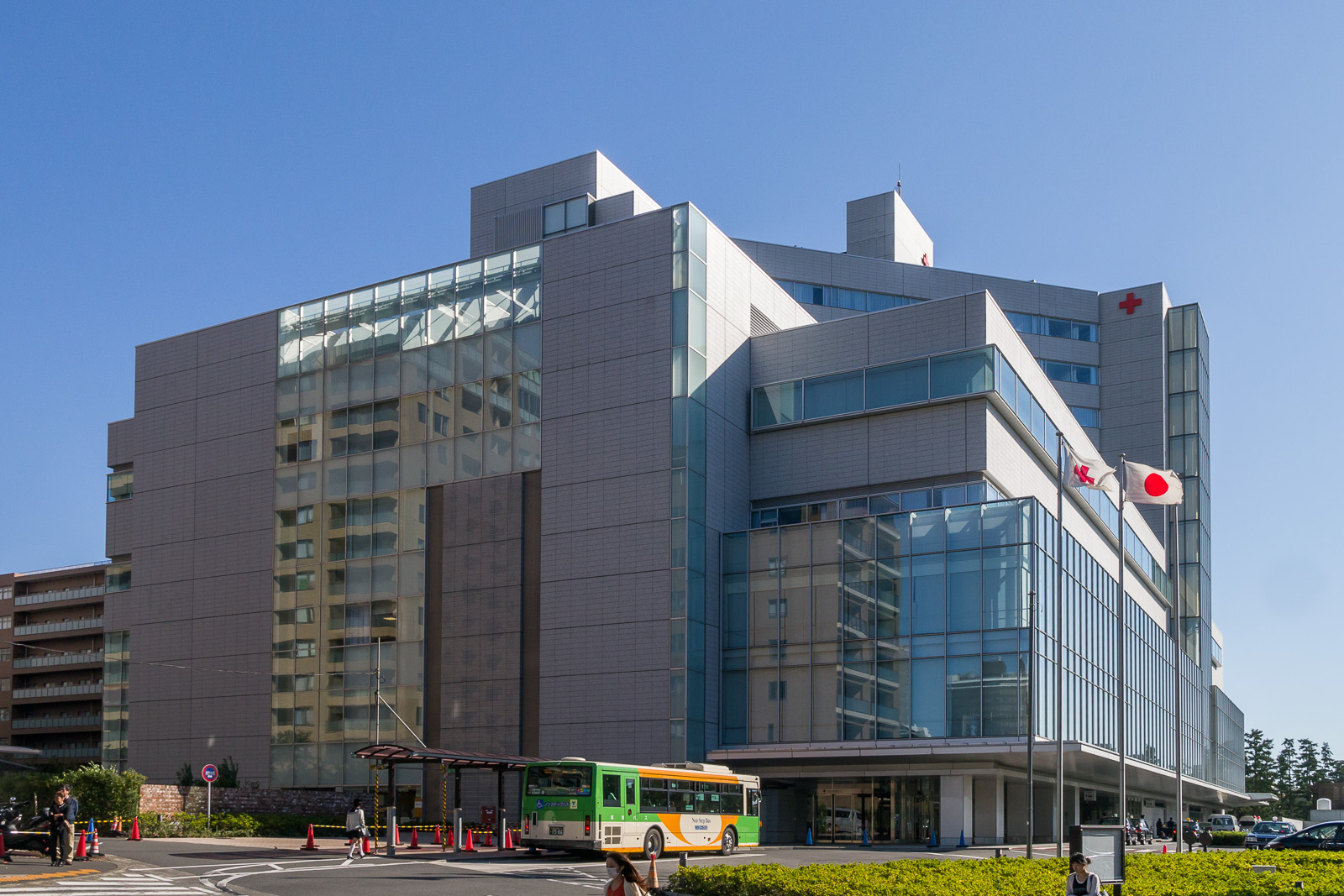
- The Japanese Red Cross Medical Center

Geography
- Location: Hiroo, Shibuya-ku, Tokyo, Japan
- Coordinates: 35.654764°N 139.717863°E

Organisation
- Type: District General

Services
- Emergency department: Yes
- Beds: 708

History
- Opened: 1891

Links
- Lists: Hospitals in Japan

The Japanese Red Cross Medical Center (JRC Medical Center) is a general hospital located in Hiroo, Shibuya-ku, Tokyo. It is the main hospital of the Japanese Red Cross Society, and is directly controlled by it. The site of Hiroo, Tokyo, where the medical center is currently located, was where a mansion of Horita Binakamori once stood.

The Japanese Red Cross Hospital, the predecessor, was built on the current location in 1891. In front of the bus stop there is a circa 500-year-old tree, which is the largest ginkgo in the area with a circumference of 4.7 meters or more, and was designated a natural monument in Shibuya-ku. The Empress has been the Honorary Governor since 1949.
