= Imperial Household (Japan) =

Emperor of Japan and his family

The Imperial Household (内廷皇族 Naitei kōzoku, also known as the Inner court), is the term for the Emperor of Japan's direct family and includes the Empress, the Empress dowager, the Grand Empress Dowager, the Imperial Crown Prince, (皇太子, kōtaishi, the heir to the throne who is son of the current Emperor), and the Imperial Crown Princess (皇太子妃, kōtaishihi, the wife of the Imperial Crown Prince), and any unmarried children of the above.

Currently Prince Fumihito holds the title of kōshi (皇嗣) as he is not the son of the current emperor, thus is not part of the Imperial household. His wife, Princess Kiko, currently holds the title kōshihi (皇嗣妃), as she is the wife of the crown prince, and not the wife of the Imperial Crown Prince. Princess Abe is the only woman to have held the title Imperial Crown Prince in her own right.

The Empress Emerita, based on the Emperor Abdication Law, is considered an equivalent to Empress Dowager (a title she will receive should her husband predecease her). The Emperor and Emperor Emeritus are usually excluded from this.

== History ==
During the Taishō era, the Imperial Household comprised the following:

The Imperial Household members
Title	Name and Image	Birthday	Ceased to be part of the Imperial Household	Reason	Relationship to the Emperor	Marriage date
Empress	Sadako	25 June, 1884	N/A	N/A	Wife	10 May, 1900
Imperial Crown Prince	Hirohito	29 April, 1901	N/A	N/A	Son	26 January, 1924 (As the Imperial Crown Prince, his marriage did not establish a new household)
Imperial Crown Princess	Nagako	6 March, 1903	N/A	N/A	Daughter-in-law (As wife of Hirohito)	26 January, 1924
Teru-no-miya	Shigeko	6 December, 1925	N/A	N/A	Granddaughter	N/A
Atsu-no-miya	Yasuhito	25 June, 1902	N/A	N/A	Son	N/A
Teru-no-miya	Nobuhito	3 January, 1905	N/A	N/A	Son	N/A
Sumi-no-miya	Takahito	2 December, 1915	N/A	N/A	Son	N/A
Empress Dowager	Shōken	9 May, 1849	N/A	Never formally ceased to be part of the Imperial Household. Passed away aged 64 on 9 April, 1914.	Step-mother (Note: Emperor Taishō's birth mother was a concubine named Yanagiwara Naruko. However, Shōken was Emperor Meiji's official wife, adoptive mother of Emperor Taishō, and held the title Kōgō (empress consort). As the official widow of the emperor (due to holding the title Kōgō) she is the Empress Dowager. As for Taishō's birth mother, while she remained a part of the Imperial court until her death, since she did not hold any of the titles needed to be considered part of the Inner-court/Imperial Household, she is not counted as a member.)	11 January, 1869

During the Shōwa era, the Imperial Household comprised the following:

The Imperial Household members
Title	Name and Image	Birthday	Ceased to be part of the Imperial Household	Reason	Relationship to the Emperor	Marriage date
Empress	Nagako	6 March, 1903	N/A	N/A	Wife	26 January, 1924
Imperial Crown Prince	Akihito	23 December, 1933	N/A	N/A	Son	10 April, 1959 (As the Imperial Crown Prince, his marriage did not establish a new household)
Imperial Crown Princess	Michiko	20 October, 1934	N/A	N/A	Daughter-in-law (As wife of Akihito)	10 April, 1959
Hiro-no-miya	Naruhito	23 February, 1960	N/A	N/A	Grandson	N/A
Aya-no-miya	Fumihito	30 November, 1965	N/A	N/A	Grandson	N/A
Nori-no-miya	Sayako	18 April, 1969	N/A	N/A	Granddaughter	N/A
Yoshi-no-miya (Before marriage, Hitachi-no-miya after)	Masahito	28 November, 1935	30 September, 1964	Marriage to Hanako Tsugaru	Son	30 September, 1964
Teru-no-miya	Shigeko	6 December, 1925	10 October, 1943	Marriage to Morihiro Higashikuni(then Prince Morihiro)	Daughter	10 October, 1943
Hisa-no-miya	Sachiko	10 September, 1927	N/A	Never formally ceased to be part of the Imperial Household. Passed away at 5 months old on 8 March, 1928.	Daughter	N/A
Taka-no-miya	Kazuko	30 September, 1929	20 May, 1950	Marriage to Toshimichi Takatsukasa	Daughter	20 May, 1950
Yori-no-miya	Atsuko	7 March, 1931	10 October, 1952	Marriage to Takamasa Ikeda	Daughter	10 October, 1952
Suga-no-miya	Takako	2 March, 1939	10 March, 1960	Marriage to Hisanaga Shimazu	Daughter	10 March, 1960
Empress Dowager	Sadako	25 June, 1884	N/A	Never formally ceased to be part of the Imperial Household. Passed away aged 66 on 17 May, 1951.	Mother	10 May, 1900

During the Heisei era, the Imperial Household comprised the following:

The Imperial Household members
Title	Name and Image	Birthday	Ceased to be part of the Imperial Household	Reason	Relationship to the Emperor	Marriage date
Empress	Michiko	20 October, 1934	N/A	N/A	Wife	10 April, 1959
Imperial Crown Prince	Naruhito	23 February, 1960	N/A	N/A	Son	19 January, 1993 (As the Imperial Crown Prince, his marriage did not establish a new household)
Imperial Crown Princess	Masako	9 December, 1963	N/A	N/A	Daughter-in-law (As wife of Naruhito)	19 January, 1993
Toshi-no-miya	Aiko	1 December, 2001	N/A	N/A	Granddaughter	N/A
Aya-no-miya (Akishino-no-miya after marriage)	Fumihito	30 November, 1965	29 June, 1990	Marriage to Kiko Kawashima and establishment of own household	Son	29 June, 1990
Nori-no-miya	Sayako	18 April, 1969	15 November, 2005	Marriage to Yoshiki Kuroda and loss of title	Daughter	15 November, 2005

== Current members ==
These are the current members of the Imperial Household:

The Imperial Household members
Title	Name and Image	Birthday	Ceased to be part of the Imperial Household	Reason	Relationship to the Emperor	Marriage date
Empress	Masako	9 December, 1963	N/A	N/A	Wife	19 January, 1993
Toshi-no-miya	Aiko	1 December, 2001	N/A	N/A	Daughter	N/A
Empress Emerita	Michiko	20 October, 1934	N/A	N/A	Mother	10 April, 1959

Despite Akihito's abdication, Michiko is still part of the Imperial Household. Should Akihito die before her, Michiko would become Empress Dowager.

== Extended imperial family ==
The imperial family of Japan is split into the following branches:

- The Imperial Household
- The Akishino-no-miya, led by Prince Fumihito
- The Hitachi-no-miya, led by Prince Masahito
- The Tomohito Mikasa-no-miya, led by Princess Tomohito of Mikasa
- The Mikasa-no-miya, led by Princess Akiko of Mikasa
- The Takamado-no-miya, led by Princess Hisako
