= Katsura-no-miya (Prince Yoshihito) =

Katsura-no-miya 桂宮家
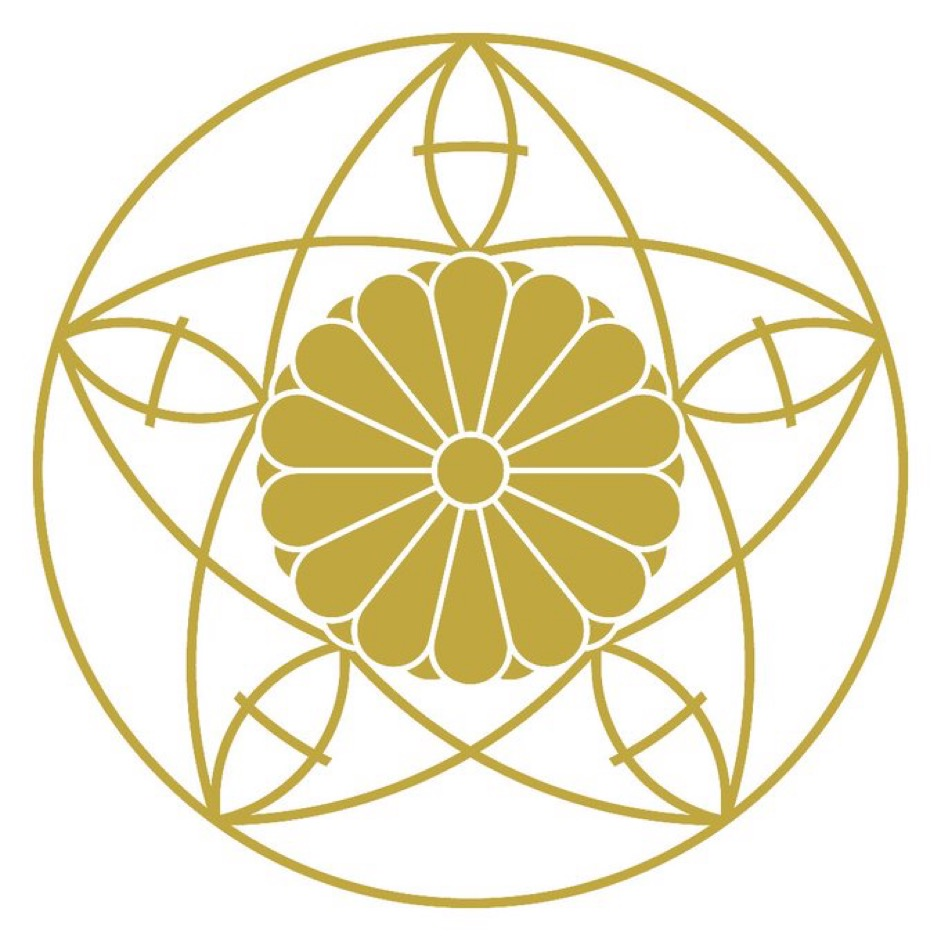
- Home province: Tokyo
- Parent house: Mikasa-no-miya
- Titles: Prince Katsura
- Founder: Yoshihito, Prince Katsura
- Final ruler: Yoshihito, Prince Katsura
- Founding year: 1988
- Dissolution: 2014

The Katsura-no-miya was a branch of the Japanese Imperial Family.

== Overview ==
The Katsura-no-miya was established on January 1st, 1988, when Emperor Showa granted Prince Yoshihito the title of Prince Katsura, as well as permission to establish a new branch of the Imperial Family, upon the occasion of his 40th birthday.This was somewhat unusual, as it is the only instance of a non-married prince establishing a new household within the Imperial Family in the postwar period.

Prince Yoshihito's title was derived from his emblem, the Katsura, and was not related to the earlier Katsura-no-miya shinnōke.

As Prince Yoshihito never married or had offspring, the Katsura-no-miya was abolished upon his death.

== Membership ==
Name	Gender	Date of Birth	Year of departure	Reason	Lineage	Notes
Yoshihito, Prince Katsura	Male	February 11, 1948	2014	Death	Second son of Prince Mikasa	Died in 2014 at the age of 66.

== Genealogy ==
123rd Emperor of Japan; Emperor Taishō
124th Emperor of Japan; Emperor Shōwa	Mikasa-no-miya; Takahito, Prince Mikasa
〔Mikasa Household〕	1st Prince Katsura; Prince Yoshihito

== Residence ==
Prince Yoshihito resided at the Katsura residence in Sanbanchō, Chiyoda, Tokyo. The residence was located on the property of an Imperial Household Agency compound, and served as the official residence of Prince Katsura until his death in 2014.

Following his creation as Prince Katsura in 1988, he declined an offer made by the Imperial Household Agency to build a new official residence, citing the considerable expense of construction, and continued to live at the IHA compound until his death.
