= Yoshihito, Prince Katsura =

Japanese prince (1948–2014)

Yoshihito
- Prince Katsura
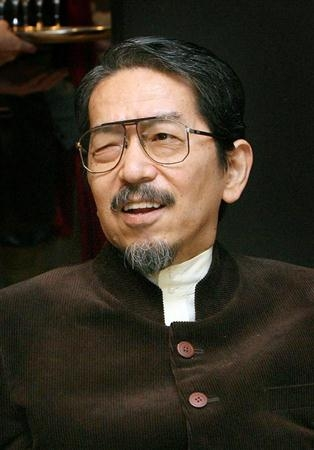
- Born: 11 February 1948; Kamiōsaki, Tokyo, Japan
- Died: 8 June 2014 (aged 66); University of Tokyo Hospital, Tokyo, Japan
- Burial: 17 June 2014; Toshimagaoka Imperial Cemetery, Bunkyo, Tokyo
- House: Katsura-no-miya
- Dynasty: Imperial House of Japan
- Father: Takahito, Prince Mikasa
- Mother: Yuriko Takagi

Yoshihito, Prince Katsura (桂宮宜仁親王, Katsura-no-miya Yoshihito Shinnō; 11 February 1948 – 8 June 2014) was a member of the Imperial House of Japan and the second son of Takahito, Prince Mikasa and Yuriko, Princess Mikasa. He was a first cousin of Emperor Akihito. Originally known as Prince Yoshihito of Mikasa, he received the title Prince Katsura (Katsura-no-miya) and authorization to start a new branch of the Imperial Family on 1 January 1988 at age 39. He died of a heart attack on 8 June 2014, aged 66.

== Early life and education ==
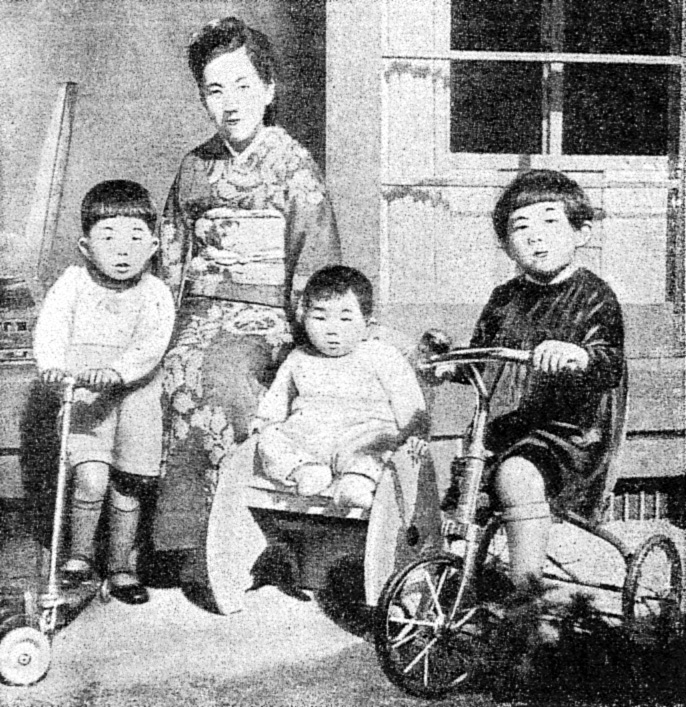
Prince Yoshihito (second from right) with (from left to right) his brother Prince Tomohito, his mother Princess Mikasa, and his sister Princess Yasuko, c. 1950

The Prince was born at the Mikasa Family Home at Kamiōsaki, Shinagawa, Tokyo.

He graduated from the Department of Political Studies in the Faculty of Law of Gakushuin University in 1971. Between 1971 and 1973, he studied at the Graduate School of the Australian National University, in Canberra, Australia. After his return to Japan, he worked as an administrator at the Japan Broadcasting Corporation from 1974 to 1985.

== Public service ==
In 1982, the Prince returned to Australia as part of the Japanese delegation in honor of the tenth anniversary of the Australia-Japan Society. He also visited New Zealand to strengthen ties and friendly diplomatic relations. Despite his disabilities following a series of strokes in 1988, he took an active role in public service, and appeared regularly at award ceremonies, diplomatic events, and as President of various charity organizations.

In July 1997, Prince Katsura again visited Australia, to help promote an exhibition of the traditional sport of sumo, with exhibition matches held in Sydney and Melbourne.

== Health problems and death ==
Prince Katsura experienced a series of strokes in May 1988 and had surgery for acute subdural hematoma. He used a wheelchair, but remained active in public life and appeared regularly at award ceremonies, diplomatic events, and as president of various charity organizations. However, he had been hospitalized on and off since 2008 due to sepsis. In early 2014, the Prince was diagnosed with an unspecified illness that affected and deteriorated his heart. In the early morning hours of 8 June 2014, he experienced a massive heart attack, and despite best efforts he was pronounced dead at 10:50 AM local time. He was 66 years old. On 17 June 2014, the main funeral service for Prince Katsura, called "Renso no Gi", was held at Toshimagaoka Imperial Cemetery in Tokyo. About 560 dignitaries including the members of Imperial Family attended the funeral. Prince and Princess Mikasa, Prince Katsura's parents, acted out the duty of chief mourners and his niece, Princess Akiko, hosted the ceremony.

Prince Katsura never married and left no legitimate children. At the time of his death, he was sixth in line to the Japanese throne.

== Honours ==
=== National ===
- Grand Cordon of the Order of the Chrysanthemum (27 February 1968)

=== Foreign ===
- Italy : Knight Grand Cross of the Order of Merit of the Italian Republic (09/03/1982)

=== Honorary positions ===
- President of the Japan Australia New Zealand Society, Inc.
- President of the Agricultural Society of Japan
- President of the Japan Forestry Association
- President of the Japan Art Crafts Association
- President of the Japanese Urushi Craft•Art Association

== Ancestry ==
Ancestors of Yoshihito, Prince Katsura

8. Mutsuhito, Emperor Meiji
4. Yoshihito, Emperor Taishō
9. Lady Naruko Yanagihara
2. Takahito, Prince Mikasa
10. Prince Michitaka Kujō
5. Lady Sadako Kujō
11. Ikuko Noma
1. Yoshihito, Prince Katsura
12. Masayoshi Takagi
6. Masanari Takagi
13. Saneko Matsudaira
3. The Hon. Yuriko Takagi
14. Tamemori Irie
7. Kuniko Irie
15. Nobuko Yanagihara

=== Patrilineal descent ===
Patrilineal descent

Imperial House of Japan

1. Descent prior to Keitai is unclear to modern historians, but traditionally traced back patrilineally to Emperor Jimmu
2. Emperor Keitai, ca. 450–534
3. Emperor Kinmei, 509–571
4. Emperor Bidatsu, 538–585
5. Prince Oshisaka, ca. 556–???
6. Emperor Jomei, 593–641
7. Emperor Tenji, 626–671
8. Prince Shiki, ???–716
9. Emperor Kōnin, 709–786
10. Emperor Kanmu, 737–806
11. Emperor Saga, 786–842
12. Emperor Ninmyō, 810–850
13. Emperor Kōkō, 830–867
14. Emperor Uda, 867–931
15. Emperor Daigo, 885–930
16. Emperor Murakami, 926–967
17. Emperor En'yū, 959–991
18. Emperor Ichijō, 980–1011
19. Emperor Go-Suzaku, 1009–1045
20. Emperor Go-Sanjō, 1034–1073
21. Emperor Shirakawa, 1053–1129
22. Emperor Horikawa, 1079–1107
23. Emperor Toba, 1103–1156
24. Emperor Go-Shirakawa, 1127–1192
25. Emperor Takakura, 1161–1181
26. Emperor Go-Toba, 1180–1239
27. Emperor Tsuchimikado, 1196–1231
28. Emperor Go-Saga, 1220–1272
29. Emperor Go-Fukakusa, 1243–1304
30. Emperor Fushimi, 1265–1317
31. Emperor Go-Fushimi, 1288–1336
32. Emperor Kōgon, 1313–1364
33. Emperor Sukō, 1334–1398
34. Prince Yoshihito Fushimi, 1351–1416
35. Prince Sadafusa Fushimi, 1372–1456
36. Emperor Go-Hanazono, 1419–1471
37. Emperor Go-Tsuchimikado, 1442–1500
38. Emperor Go-Kashiwabara, 1464–1526
39. Emperor Go-Nara, 1495–1557
40. Emperor Ōgimachi, 1517–1593
41. Prince Masahito, 1552–1586
42. Emperor Go-Yōzei, 1572–1617
43. Emperor Go-Mizunoo, 1596–1680
44. Emperor Reigen, 1654–1732
45. Emperor Higashiyama, 1675–1710
46. Prince Naohito Kanin, 1704–1753
47. Prince Sukehito Kanin, 1733–1794
48. Emperor Kōkaku, 1771–1840
49. Emperor Ninkō, 1800–1846
50. Emperor Kōmei, 1831–1867
51. Emperor Meiji, 1852–1912
52. Emperor Taishō, 1879–1926
53. Takahito, Prince Mikasa
54. Yoshihito, Prince Katsura
