= Imperial House of Japan =

Japanese imperial family

Imperial House 皇室 Kōshitsu Kōka (皇家) Kyūshitsu (宮室)
- Imperial crest
- Country: Japan
- Founded: 11 February 660 BC, 2685 years ago (mythical); 5 December 539 AD, 1486 years ago (first historical emperor)
- Founder: Emperor Jimmu (mythical)
- Current head: Naruhito
- Seat: Tokyo Imperial Palace
- Historic seat: List: Heian-kyō (Emperor's palace) and Kamakura (Shōgun's residence); Heian-kyō (Emperor's palace) and Azuchi (Shōgun's residence); Heian-kyō (Emperor's palace) and Edo (Shōgun's residence); Edo Castle
- Titles: Emperor of Japan; Empress of Japan (regnant); Emperor Emeritus; Dharma Emperor; Great King of Yamato; King of Wa; Regent of Japan; Shogun
- Connected families: List: Though mythological claims: Toyotomi clan; Abe clan; Tsuchimikado family (Abe clan); Nakatomi clan; Ōnakatomi clan; Fujiwara clan; Ashikaga clan (Fujiwara); Oyama clan; Shimokōbe clan; Koyama clan; Sano clan; Ōgo clan; Asonuma clan; Yūki clan; Yūki Shimōsa; Yūki Shirakawa; Shōni clan; Ōtomo clan; Tachibana clan; Honma clan; Hamochi-Homma; Kawarada-Homma; Sakata-Homma; Hayashi clan; Abe clan of Mikawa Province; Honda clan; Ii clan; Utsunomiya clan; Ōkubo clan; Toda clan; Nanke Family; Kudō; Itō; Okada Itō; Irie clan; Kikkawa; Nikaidō; Sagara; Imamura clan; Shikike Family; Kyōke Family; Fujiwara Hok-ke; Five regent houses; Kazan’in family; Takakura family; Ononomiya family; Konoe family; Takatsukasa family; Yoshii family; Tokiwai family; Miyagawa family; Inbe clan; Oda clan; Isa clan; Date clan; Tamura clan (restored); Uwajima clan; Yoshida clan; Tōdō clan; Haji clan; Ōe clan; Mōri clan; Kitakoji family; Tokuoka family; Nagai clan; Nawa clan; Kaito clan; Ueda clan; Katsura clan; Sakai clan; Echigo Hojo clan; Yasuda clan; Yamamura clan; Asai clan; Akishino clan; Sugawara clan; Maeda clan; Takatsuji clan; Gojō clan; Higashibōjō clan; Karahashi clan; Kiyo'oka clan; Kuwahara clan; Kodama clan; Niwa clan; Kuni no miyatsuko; Yamato no Kuni no Miyatsuko; Ō clan; Aso clan; Owari clan; Amabe clan; Ukai family; Munakata clan; Kii no Kuni no Miyatsuko clan; Yamato no Aya clan; Sakanoue clan; Ōtomo clan (disputed); Shiga clan; Tamura clan (original line); Hata clan (not to be confused with the Hata clan); Hirano clan; Karakuchi clan; Karakuni clan; Sueyo clan; Yamaguchi clan; Aratai clan; Fumi clan; Ikebe clan; Tani clan; Hata clan; Hata clan; Chōsokabe clan (disputed); Kawakatsu clan; Koremune clan; Sō clan; Shimazu clan; Akishi clan; Ichikishi clan; Jinbō clan; Kabayama clan; Kawahara clan; Kawamata clan; Shūin clan; Kikuchi clan; Matsura clan; others
- Cadet branches: List: The Shinnōke and Ōke; Fushimi-no-miya; Nashimoto-no-miya; Yamashina-no-miya; Kuni-no-miya; Komatsu-no-miya; Kitashirakawa-no-miya; Takeda-no-miya; Higashifushimi-no-miya; Kiyosu comital family (non-imperial branch); Kachō-no-miya (non-imperial branch); Fushimi comital family (non-imperial branch); Arisugawa-no-miya; Katsura-no-miya; Hirotada noble family (non-imperial branch); Kan'in-no-miya; Mikasa-no-miya; Hitachi-no-miya; Takamado-no-miya; Akishino-no-miya; Minamoto clan; Saga Genji; Ninmyō Genji; Montoku Genji; Seiwa Genji; Ashikaga clan; Hatakeyama clan (restored line); Hosokawa clan; Nagaoka clan; Kumamoto Kumamoto-Shinden Udo Hitachi-Yatabe Saikyu clan; Kira clan; Shiba clan; Shibata clan (Echizen); Hachisuka clan; Imagawa clan; Horikoshi clan; Sena clan; others; Sanada clan; Mori clan; Nanbu clan; Nitta clan; Satomi clan; Matsudaira clan; Yūki-Matsudaira clan (Echizen); Hisamatsu-Matsudaira clan; Ochi-Matsudaira clan; Hoshina-Matsudaira clan (Aizu); Tokugawa clan; Gosanke; Owari Tokugawa family; Takasu-Matsudaira family; Kishū Tokugawa family; Saijō-Matsudaira family; Gosankyō; Tayasu family; Hitotsubashi family; Shimizu family; Mito Tokugawa family; Matsudo-Tokugawa family; Tokugawa Yoshinobu family; Sakai clan; Wakiya clan; Yamana clan; Serada clan; Horiguchi clan; Iwamatsu clan; Odachi clan; Ōta clan; Satake clan; Iwasaki; Kubota-Shinden; others.; Takeda clan; Aki Takeda; Wakasa Takeda; Kazusa Takeda; Ogasawara clan; Miyoshi clan; Mizukami clan; Tomono clan; Hayashi clan (Jōzai); Matsumae clan; Nanbu clan; Yonekura clan; Yanagisawa clan; Gotō clan; Miyoshi clan; Akiyama clan; Toki clan; Asano clan; Akechi clan; Seyasu clan; Ibi clan; Hidase clan; Osu clan; Tawara clan; Toyama clan; Funaki clan; Fumizuki clan; Ishikawa clan (Mutsu-Ishikawa clan); Nakagawa clan; others; Yōzei Genji; Toba Genji; Ichijō Genji; Kōkō Genji; Uda Genji; Sasaki clan; Rokkaku clan; Amago clan; Kyōgoku clan; Kuroda clan; Takashima clan; Rokkaku clan; Kyōgoku clan; Kutsugi clan; Kuroda clan; Oki clan; Enya clan; Toda clan; Takaoka clan; Koshi clan; Sase clan; Nogi clan; others; En'yū Genji; Daigo Genji; Murakami Genji; Tsuchimikado family (Murakami Genji); Reizei Genji; Sutoku Genji; Kazan Genji; Sanjō Genji; Takakura Genji; Antoku Genji; Go-Toba Genji; Go-Sanjō Genji; Go-Shirakawa Genji; Juntoku Genji; Go-Saga Genji; Hanazono Genji; Go-Fusakusa Genji; Ōgimachi Genji; Go-Hanazono Genji; Taira clan; Mizuno clan; Hōjō clan; Chiba; Sōma clan; Hashimoto clan; Izumi clan; Okada clan; Tō clan; Miura clan; Ashina clan; Sagami-Ashina; Aizu-Ashina; Nagao clan; Uesugi clan (clan merger); Ōgigayatsu Uesugi; Inukake Uesugi; Yamanouchi Uesugi; Uchima; Tajiri clan; Hatakeyama clan (original line); Nihonmatsu clan; Higo clan; Tanegashima; others; Tachibana clan; Kyūshū Tachibana; Iyo Tachibana
- Website: www.kunaicho.go.jp/eindex.html

The Imperial House (皇室, Kōshitsu) is the reigning dynasty of Japan, consisting of those members of the extended family of the reigning emperor of Japan who undertake official and public duties. Under the present constitution of Japan, the emperor is "the symbol of the State and of the unity of the people". Other members of the imperial family perform ceremonial and social duties, but have no role in the affairs of government. The duties as an emperor are passed down the line to their male children. The Japanese monarchy is the oldest continuous hereditary monarchy in the world.

== Origins and name ==
The imperial house recognizes 126 monarchs, beginning with Emperor Jimmu (traditionally dated to 11 February 660 BC), and continuing up to the current emperor, Naruhito. However, scholars have agreed that there is no evidence of Jimmu's existence, that the traditional narrative of the imperial family's founding is mythical, and that Jimmu is a mythical figure. Historical evidence for the first 25 emperors is scant, and they are considered mythical, but there is sufficient evidence of an unbroken agnatic line since the early 6th century. Historically, verifiable emperors of Japan start from 539 CE with Emperor Kinmei, the 29th tennō.

The earliest historic written mentions of Japan were in Chinese records, where it was referred to as Wa (倭 later 和), which later evolved into the Japanese name of Wakoku. Suishō (ca. 107 CE) was a king of Wa, the earliest Japanese monarch mentioned in Volume 85 of the Book of the Later Han from 445 CE. Further records mention the five kings of Wa, of which the last one Bu of Wa is generally considered to be Emperor Yūryaku (417/18 – 479 CE). The existence of his reign has been established through modern archaeological research.

While the main line of the dynasty does not have a name and is referred to as Kōshitsu (皇室, imperial house), there are agnatic cadet branches which split during the course of centuries who received their own family names in order to distinguish them from the main line. They were considered a part of the imperial family (皇族 Kōzoku), with members carrying the title "Imperial Highness", until the laws changed in 1947. The most important branches were the Shinnōke of which the most senior branch Fushimi-no-miya is first in the order of succession. Out of the Fushimi branch the Ōke branches split, which are the Kuni, Kaya, Asaka, Higashikuni and Takeda families as of 2024. Furthermore there are branches created from sons of the emperor who were excluded from the line of succession and demoted into the ranks of the court (kuge) or sword (buke) nobility. Such families are the Minamoto (源 also known as Genji), Taira (平 also known as Heishi), as well as through in-laws the Tachibana for example. Out of these families further branches split through male descent who were also considered noble Japanese clans. The line of legitimate direct male descendants of emperors is therefore numerous.

Other terms used for the dynasty are also Kōka (皇家, Imperial House). Formerly the term Kyūshitsu (宮室, Palace Household) was also used under the old Imperial Constitution and the Imperial Household Law, as well as Teishitsu (帝室, Imperial Household).

== List of current members ==
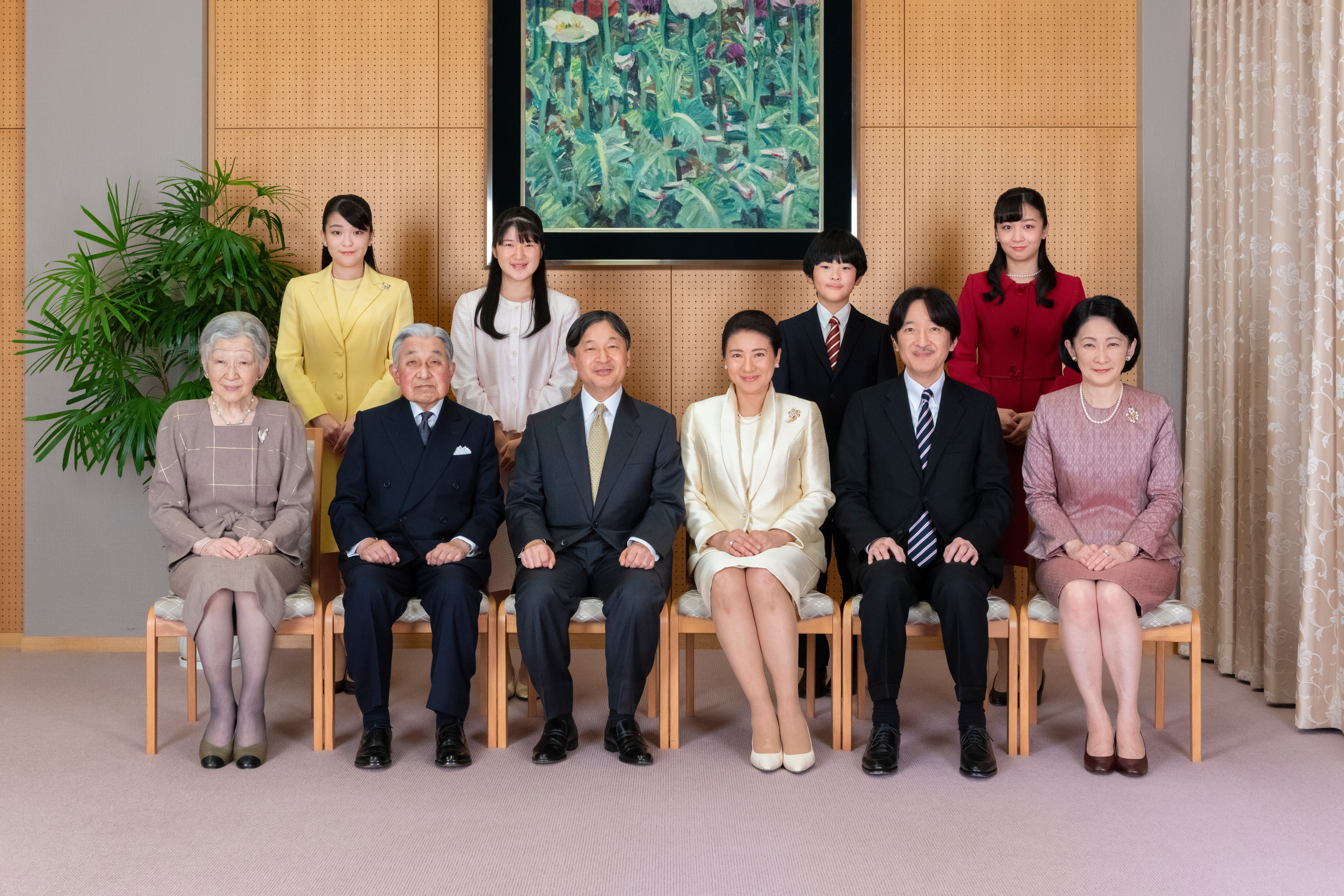
Emperor Naruhito and Empress Masako with some of the other members of the imperial family, 2021

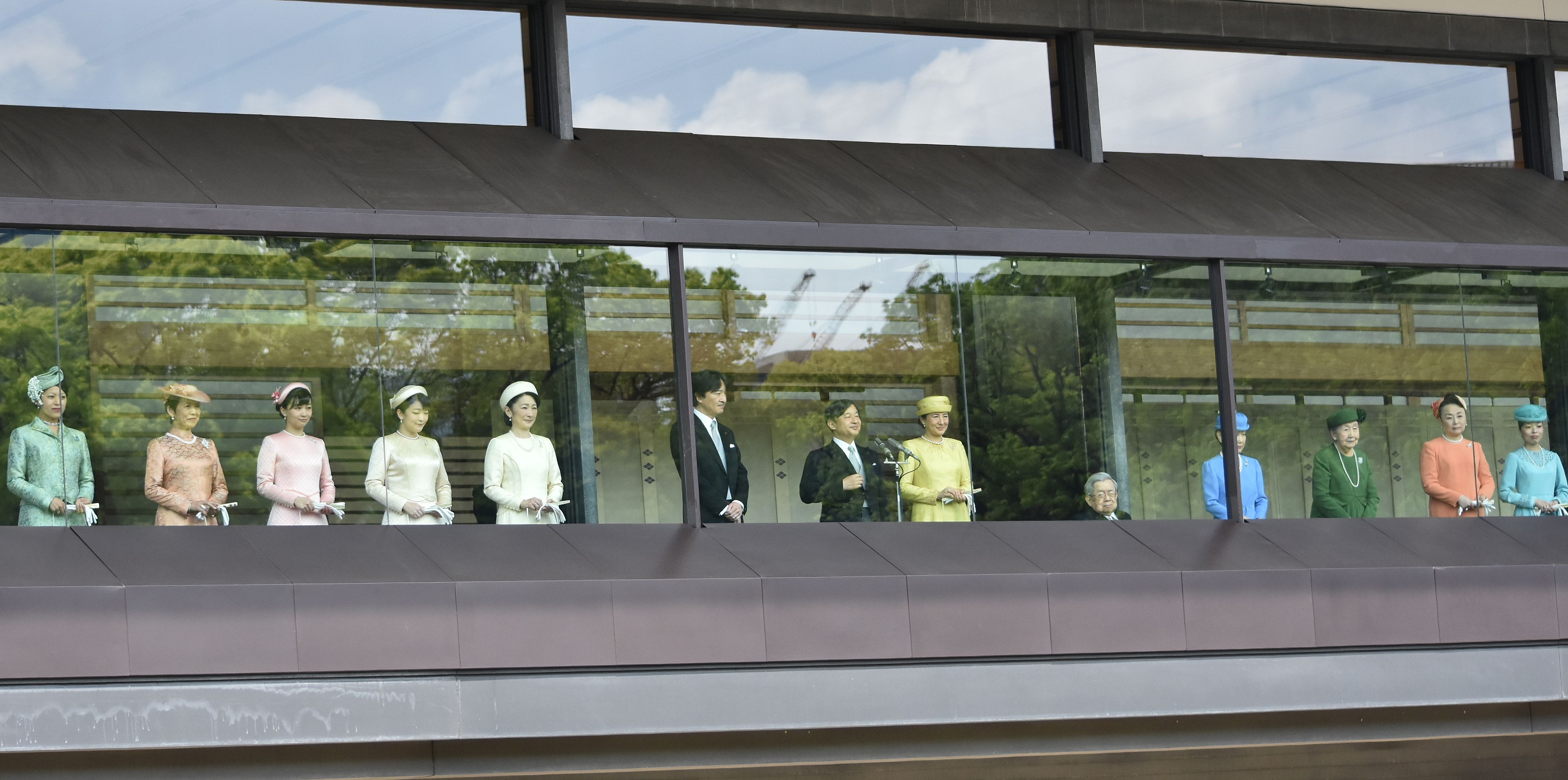
Members of the imperial family show themselves to the general public during celebrations for the new emperor's enthronement. Emperor Emeritus Akihito and Empress Emerita Michiko are not present (4 May 2019).

The emperor (天皇, tennō) is the head of the Japanese imperial family.

Article 3 and 4 of the Emperor Abdication Law define the Emperor Emeritus and Empress Emerita. (Note: jōkōgō (上皇后))

Article 5 of the Imperial Household Law defines the Imperial Family members (Note: kōzoku (皇族)) as the Empress; the grand empress dowager; (Note: tai-kōtaigō (太皇太后)) the empress dowager; (Note: kōtaigō (皇太后)) the Emperor's legitimate sons and legitimate grandsons in the legitimate male line, (Note: shinnō (親王)) and their consorts; (Note: shinnōhi (親王妃)) the Emperor's unmarried legitimate daughters and unmarried legitimate granddaughters in the legitimate male line; (Note: naishinnō (内親王)) the Emperor's other legitimate male descendants in the third and later generations in the legitimate male line and their consorts; (Note: ōhi (王妃)) and the Emperor's other unmarried legitimate female descendants in the third and later generations in the legitimate male line. (Note: joō (女王))

In English, shinnō (親王) and ō (王) are both translated as "prince" as well as shinnōhi (親王妃), naishinnō (内親王), ōhi (王妃) and joō (女王) as "princess".

After the removal of 11 collateral branches from the imperial house in October 1947, the official membership of the imperial family has effectively been limited to the male-line descendants of the Emperor Taishō, excluding females who married outside the imperial family and their descendants.

There are currently 16 members of the imperial family:

- Emperor Naruhito, the eldest son and first child of the Emperor Emeritus Akihito and the Empress Emerita Michiko, was born in the Hospital of the Imperial Household in Tokyo on 23 February 1960. He became heir apparent upon his father's accession to the throne. Crown Prince Naruhito married Masako Owada on 9 June 1993. He ascended to the Chrysanthemum Throne and became the 126th emperor upon his father's abdication on 1 May 2019.
- Empress Masako was born on 9 December 1963, the daughter of Hisashi Owada, a former vice minister of foreign affairs and former permanent representative of Japan to the United Nations. She became empress consort upon her husband's succession to the throne on 1 May 2019.
  - Aiko, Princess Toshi was born on 1 December 2001, and is the only child of Emperor Naruhito and Empress Masako.
- Emperor Emeritus Akihito was born at Tokyo Imperial Palace on 23 December 1933, the eldest son and fifth child of the Emperor Shōwa and Empress Kōjun. He married Michiko Shōda on 10 April 1959. When his father died on 7 January 1989, Akihito became emperor of Japan. He abdicated on 30 April 2019, and was succeeded by his eldest son, Naruhito on 1 May 2019.
- Empress Emerita Michiko was born in Tokyo on 20 October 1934, the eldest daughter of Hidesaburō Shōda, president and honorary chairman of Nisshin Flour Milling Inc.
  - Fumihito, Crown Prince Akishino is the Emperor Emeritus' second son, the Emperor's younger brother and the current heir presumptive. He was born on 30 November 1965 in the Hospital of the Imperial Household in Tokyo. His childhood title was Prince Aya. He received the title Prince Akishino and permission to start a new branch of the Imperial Family upon his marriage to Kiko Kawashima on 29 June 1990.
  - Kiko, Crown Princess Akishino was born on 11 September 1966, the daughter of Tatsuhiko Kawashima, professor of economics at Gakushuin University. Crown Prince and Princess Akishino have two daughters (one of whom remains a member of the Imperial Family) and a son:
    - Princess Kako of Akishino (born 29 December 1994), the second daughter of the Crown Prince Akishino.
    - Prince Hisahito of Akishino (born 6 September 2006), the first male born to the Imperial Household since his father 41 years before.
- Masahito, Prince Hitachi was born on 28 November 1935 at Tokyo Imperial Palace, the second son and sixth child of the Emperor Shōwa and Empress Kojun. His childhood title was Prince Yoshi. He received the title Prince Hitachi and permission to set up a new branch of the Imperial Family on 1 October 1964, the day after his wedding.
- Hanako, Princess Hitachi was born on 19 July 1940, the daughter of former Count Yoshitaka Tsugaru. The Prince and Princess Hitachi have no children.
- Nobuko, Princess Tomohito of Mikasa is the widow of Prince Tomohito of Mikasa (5 January 1946 – 6 June 2012), the eldest son of the Prince and Princess Mikasa and a first cousin once removed of Emperor Naruhito. Princess Tomohito was born on 9 April 1955, the daughter of Takakichi Asō, chairman of Asō Cement Co., and his wife, Kazuko, a daughter of former Prime Minister Shigeru Yoshida. She has two daughters with the late Prince Tomohito of Mikasa:
  - Princess Akiko of Mikasa (born 20 December 1981)
  - Princess Yōko of Mikasa (born 25 October 1983)
- Hisako, Princess Takamado is the widow of Norihito, Prince Takamado (29 December 1954 – 21 November 2002), the third son and the youngest child of the Prince and Princess Mikasa and a first cousin once removed of Emperor Naruhito. The Princess Takamado was born on 10 July 1953, the eldest daughter of Shigejiro Tottori. She married the Prince Takamado on 6 December 1984. Originally known as Prince Norihito of Mikasa, he received the title Prince Takamado and permission to start a new branch of the Imperial Family on 1 December 1984. The Princess Takamado has three daughters, one of whom remains a member of the Imperial Family:
  - Princess Tsuguko of Takamado (born 6 March 1986)

=== Family tree ===
The following family tree shows the lineage of current members of Japanese imperial family:

Emperor Taishō †	Empress Teimei †
Emperor Shōwa †	Empress Kōjun †	The Prince Mikasa †	The Princess Mikasa †
**The Emperor Emeritus**	**The Empress Emerita**	**The Prince Hitachi** (3)	**The Princess Hitachi**	Two surviving daughters 1, 2	Prince Tomohito of Mikasa †	**Princess Tomohito of Mikasa**	The Prince Takamado †	**The Princess Takamado**	Two daughters 1, 2
**The Emperor**	**The Empress**	**Crown Prince Akishino** (1)	**Crown Princess Akishino**	Sayako Kuroda	**Princess Akiko**	**Princess Yōko**	**Princess Tsuguko**	Two daughters 1, 2
**Princess Aiko**	Mako Komuro	**Princess Kako**	**Prince Hisahito** (2)

Notes

- Numbers in brackets indicate places in the line of succession.
- Boldface indicates living individuals listed as members of the imperial family.
- Italics indicate princesses who left the Imperial Family upon their marriage.
- Dashed lines indicate married couples.
- Dagger (†) indicates deceased individuals.

=== Branches ===
The Imperial Family includes the Imperial Household which is the Emperor and his family, along with the following branches:

Mon	Branch	Founder	Head	Other members
	**Mikasa-no-miya** (三笠宮家)	The Prince Mikasa	Princess Akiko of Mikasa	Princess Tomohito of Mikasa; Princess Yōko of Mikasa
	**Hitachi-no-miya** (常陸宮家)	The Prince Hitachi		The Princess Hitachi
	**Takamado-no-miya** (高円宮家)	The Prince Takamado	The Princess Takamado	Princess Tsuguko of Takamado
	**Akishino-no-miya** (秋篠宮家)	Crown Prince Akishino		Crown Princess Akishino; Princess Kako of Akishino; Prince Hisahito of Akishino

== Living former members ==
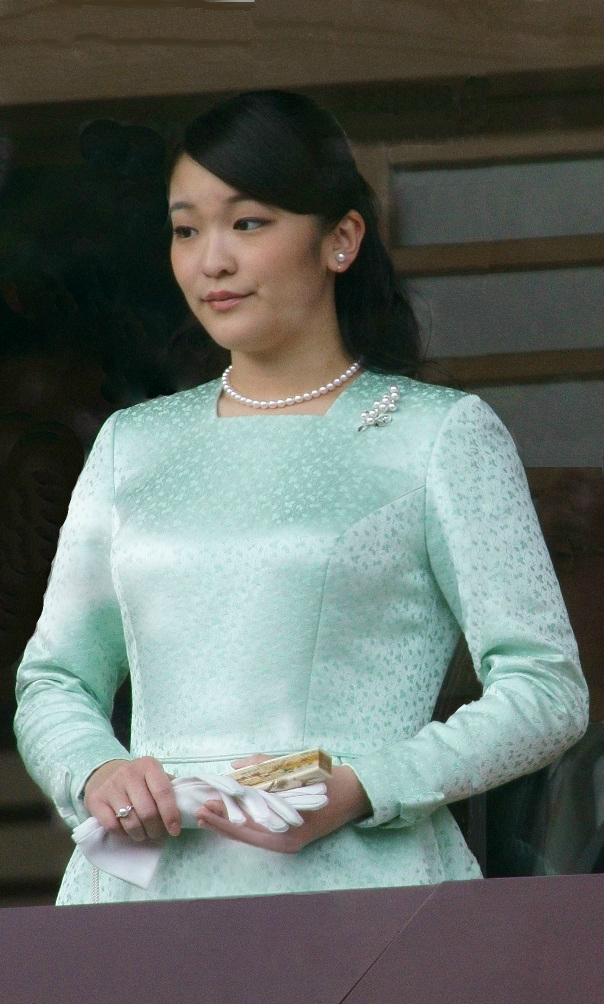
Princess Mako forwent a one-off million-dollar payment given to imperial women upon leaving the imperial family

Under the terms of the 1947 Imperial Household Law, naishinnō (imperial princesses) and joō (princesses) lose their titles and membership in the family upon marriage, unless they marry the Emperor or another male member of the imperial family.

Four of the five daughters of Emperor Shōwa, the two daughters of the Prince Mikasa, the only daughter of Emperor Emeritus Akihito, the second and third daughter of the Prince Takamado, and most recently, the eldest daughter of Crown Prince Akishino, left the Imperial Family upon marriage, joining the husband's family and thus taking the surname of the husband.

The eight living former imperial princesses are:

- Atsuko Ikeda (born 7 March 1931), fourth daughter and fourth child of Emperor Shōwa and Empress Kōjun, only surviving elder sister of Emperor Emeritus Akihito.
- Takako Shimazu (born 2 March 1939), fifth daughter and youngest child of Emperor Shōwa and Empress Kōjun, younger sister of Emperor Emeritus Akihito.
- Yasuko Konoe (born 26 April 1944), eldest daughter and eldest child of the Prince and Princess Mikasa.
- Masako Sen (born 23 October 1951), second daughter and fourth child of the Prince and Princess Mikasa.
- Sayako Kuroda (born 18 April 1969), third child and only daughter of Emperor Emeritus Akihito and Empress Emerita Michiko, younger sister of Emperor Naruhito.
- Noriko Senge (born 22 July 1988), second daughter of the Prince and Princess Takamado.
- Ayako Moriya (born 15 September 1990), third daughter and youngest child of the Prince and Princess Takamado.
- Mako Komuro (born 23 October 1991), first daughter and eldest child of the Crown Prince and Crown Princess Akishino.

== Kyū-Miyake ==
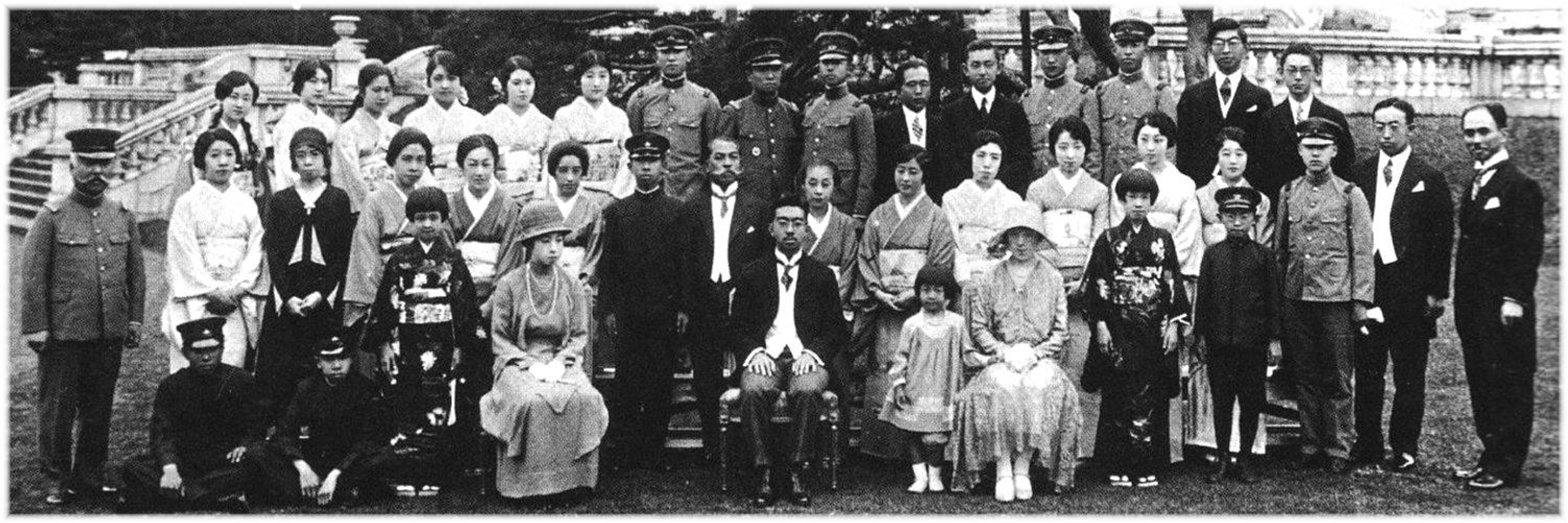
Emperor Shōwa and members of the Kyū-Miyake (Cadet Royal Families)

The Imperial House of Japan today is limited to the agnatic descendants of Emperor Taishō. Emperor Taishō was the only son of Emperor Meiji, who was the sole surviving son of Emperor Kōmei. Emperor Kōmei had likewise been the only surviving biological son of Emperor Ninko. As a result, the present Imperial House also descends solely from Emperor Kōkaku through an unbroken line of only sons, each being the sole surviving male heir of his predecessor. Even when tracing the lineage further back to Emperor Higashiyama, all other biological branches have either become extinct or been severed from the Imperial Family through adoption into other noble houses, such as the Takatsukasa. Thus, since the late eighteenth century, the Japanese imperial succession has been sustained by an exceptionally narrow and fragile line of descent.

However, in 1817, Prince Fushimi Kuniie was adopted by Emperor Kōkaku as his son. Through this adoption, Prince Kuniie became a full member of the imperial family (shinnō), with the same status as a natural-born son of the emperor. Consequently, the Fushimi-no-miya house, descended from Prince Kuniie, forms the closest collateral line to the main imperial lineage. In Japanese law and custom, adoption fully replaced previous blood ties, meaning that an adopted son was integrated into his new family as if born into it, with all rights of inheritance and succession. Historically, the imperial family often sustained its agnatic line through such adoptions from other imperial branches. This would be later banned in 1889.

Emperor Kōkaku himself came from a cadet branch of the imperial family. He was originally the son of Prince Kan'in Sukehito of the Kan'in-no-miya line. His uncle, Prince Atsushi (later Takatsukasa Sukehira), was adopted into the Takatsukasa family, one of the Five Regent Houses (go-sekke). Although this adoption transferred new imperial blood into the Takatsukasa line, it did not confer succession rights to the throne. Adoption into a noble house effectively severed a person's ties to the imperial family for purposes of succession. As a result, despite their descent from an imperial prince, the Takatsukasa family was never considered part of the imperial succession. When the first iteration of the Kan'in-no-miya line became extinct upon the death of its fifth head, Prince Kan'in Naruhito, in 1842, the house was formally treated as extinct. This decision persisted despite the existence of surviving biological descendants of the Kan'in-no-miya, the Takatsuka line, and Prince Kyōjin, Naruhito's brother, whom Emperor Kōkaku had adopted. This house was later revived by Kotohito, the sixth Prince Kan'in, who, posthumously adopted by Naruhito, the fifth Prince Kan'in, was treated as the 6th head.

Originally, Miyake itself was formed when members of the imperial line, specifically, male-line descendants of the Emperor who, while belonging to the imperial family, did not inherit the throne, were granted portions of the imperial estates. These estates became their personal holdings, and at the same time, they were bestowed the title of Miya (House), often derived from the geographic location of their new estates. However, under normal circumstances, many of these houses were ephemeral, disappearing within a few generations.

The issue of succession became particularly significant just before Emperor Shōkō died in 1428. At that time, the other legitimate male-line descendants of the Jimyōin line, at least those who weren't cloistered, were believed to have become extinct, except the collateral branches descending from Prince Sadafusa, the third head of the Fushimi-no-miya. Both Emperor Shōkō and Prince Sadafusa descended from the two sons of Emperor Kōgon. Emperor Shōkō was the last descendant of Emperor Go-Kōgon. While Prince Sadafusa, together with his descendants, were the last line of Emperor Sukō. Emperor Kōgon himself had been the sole surviving male-line descendant of Emperor Go-Fukakusa, the founder of the Jimyōin line. Other potential collateral lines were either extinct or no longer recognised. The lineage of Emperor Kōmyō stopped at him. The lineage of Prince Naohito, a son of Emperor Hanazono, though some sources claimed he was instead a son of Emperor Kōgon, had disappeared, as his children had entered Buddhist orders and left no known heirs. Another collateral branch, the Itsujinomiya line, was founded by Prince Hiroaki, the third son of Prince Hisaaki, the eighth Kamakura shōgun and also the younger brother of Prince Morikuni, the ninth shōgun. However, this line was never formally proclaimed an imperial branch in 1367. The last known reference to the Itsujinomiya dates to 1432, when its members petitioned for mediation in a dispute over estates in Kyushu, and no further records of the lineage are known. As a result, by the time of Emperor Shōkō’s death in 1428, the Fushimi-no-miya house effectively represented the only recognised surviving male-line descendants of the Jimyōin imperial lineage.

In response, when Emperor Go-Hanazono, a member of Fushimi-no-miya, ascended the throne. He recognised the urgent necessity of ensuring dynastic continuity, and an imperial decree designated the Fushimi-no-miya house as the "Hereditary Imperial Prince" (永代宮家). Under this system, successors to the Fushimi-no-miya title would be adopted into the imperial family by the reigning emperor or retired emperor and conferred the status of imperial princes (shinnō). Should the main imperial line become extinct, they would be poised to assume the throne. This institutional arrangement came to be known as the "hereditary imperial prince families" (世襲親王家, Seshū Shinnōke), with three additional houses, Katsura-no-miya, Arisugawa-no-miya, and Kan'in-no-miya, later established to fortify this structure.

Even at the end of the Edo period, the Fushimi-no-miya family was treated as virtually equivalent to the emperor himself, often referred to simply as "Fushimi-dono." It was universally understood that the principal collateral branches, from which imperial heirs could arise, descended from this house. Notably, Prince Asahiko (also known as Nakagawa-no-miya) emerged as a figure of profound influence, serving as a trusted confidant and political adviser to Emperor Kōmei. During the Boshin War, Prince Kōgen of Rinnoji barricaded himself in Kan'ei-ji Temple during the Battle of Ueno and, according to some theories, was even symbolically enthroned as the so-called "Tōbu Emperor," representing the resistance alliance of northern domains (Ōuetsu Reppan Dōmei).

During the period surrounding the Meiji Restoration, several Fushimi-no-miya members, including Prince Sadayoshi (the 19th head) and Prince Kuniie (the 20th and 23rd heads), renounced priestly life and reentered the secular world, founding new miyake. Initially, these new houses were intended to be temporary, limited to a single generation. However, given Emperor Meiji’s initial lack of male offspring and the frail health of his only adult son, Prince Yoshihito (later Emperor Taishō), there emerged an acute concern for the survival of the imperial line. Emperor Meiji thus strongly advocated the permanent continuation of these newly formed imperial houses.

The Imperial House Law (Kōshitsu Tenpan) of 1889 enshrined the system of permanent collateral branch families. However, succession within these houses was strictly limited to direct descendants; adoption across houses was prohibited. Consequently, the Katsura-no-miya line, having become extinct, was abolished; the Kan'in-no-miya line had earlier been merged back into the Fushimi-no-miya lineage; and the Arisugawa-no-miya line was abolished in 1913. By the early Taishō period, except for the emperor's immediate family, nearly all collateral imperial houses traced their lineage to Fushimi-no-miya. As a result, these houses came to be collectively known as the "Fushimi-no-miya Imperial Family."

The interconnection of these houses deepened further when four daughters of Emperor Meiji married into the Kitashirakawa-no-miya, Takeda-no-miya, Asaka-no-miya, and Higashikuni-no-miya houses. However, with Emperor Taishō reaching adulthood and fathering four healthy sons, the succession crisis abated. Consequently, from the late Taishō era onward, expansion of the collateral houses was deliberately restrained, and many imperial family members were ultimately demoted to commoner status pursuant to specific regulations on "descent to commoner status" (kōzoku no heiminka).

In the modern era, influenced by the restoration of imperial rule and modelled on European aristocratic norms, male members of the imperial family were required to serve in the military and contribute to the national polity. Under the Imperial Family Status Ordinance (Kōshitsu Seido), many members of the Fushimi-no-miya lineage took up military roles.

=== Family tree ===
Under the European principle of primogeniture, to showcase the biological relationship, the Imperial House of Japan would consist of the following.

- Sadafusa, third Prince of Fushimi-no-miya. The most recent common ancestor in the paternal line of the current Imperial family and its former collateral branches.
  - Five Emperors, Emperor Go-Hanazono, Emperor Go-Tsuchimikado, Emperor Go-Kashiwabara, Emperor Go-Nara, and Emperor Ōgimachi, each producing only a single heir, a reigning successor. The others were sent away to monasteries as cloistered imperial princes.
    - Prince Masahito
      - Emperor Go-Yōzei
        - Emperor Go-Mizunoo
          - Emperor Go-Kōmyō. No son.
          - Emperor Go-Sai
            - Arisugawa-no-miya starting in 1667 with the Yukihito, third Prince of Arisugawa. Extinct in 1716 with the death of his son, Tadahito, the fourth Prince of Arisugawa. The house continued with adoption until 1913.
          - Emperor Reigen
            - Emperor Higashiyama
              - Emperor Nakamikado, Emperor Sakuramachi, Emperor Momozono, and Emperor Go-Momozono. Extinct in 1779 with the death of Emperor Go-Momozono. Also had Empress Go-Sakuramachi between Emperor Momozono and Emperor Go-Momozono.
              - Naohito,first Prince Kan'in
                - Takatsukasa family. Descended from Takatsukasa Sukehira. Agnatic descendants are still extant. It is one of the Kobetsu Sekke, three of the Five Regent Houses, established during the Edo period by male members of the imperial family through adoption and succession, and their male descendants. Had no right to succession to the imperial throne.
                - Sukehito, second Prince Kan'in
                  - Kan'in-no-miya. Extinct in 1842. Descended from Haruhito, the third Prince Kan'in. Formally extinct in 1842 with the death of Naruhito, fifth Prince Kan'in. However, his brother Prince Kyōjine, who had been adopted by Emperor Kōkaku, remained alive until 1851. The house continued on with adoption until 1988.
                  - Imperial Family. Descended from Emperor Kōkaku, who was adopted by Emperor Go-Momozono. Here descended the Emperor Emeritus Heisei, Emperor Reiwa, Crown Prince Akishino, Prince Hisahito of Akishino, and Prince Masahito of Hitachi
            - Kyōgoku-no-miya starting with the adoption of Ayahito, seventh Prince of Kyōgoku, in 1696. Extinct in 1770 with the death of Kinhito, ninth Prince of Kyōgoku. The house continued on with adoption until 1881.
            - Arisugawa-no-miya starting with the adoption of Yorihito, fifth Prince of Arisugawa, in 1716. Extinct with the death of Prince Arisugawa Takehito in 1913.
        - Konoe family. Descended from Konoe Nobuhiro. Agnatic descendants are still extant. It is one of the Kobetsu Sekke, three of the Five Regent Houses, established during the Edo period by male members of the imperial family through adoption and succession, and their male descendants. Had no right to succession to the imperial throne.
        - Ichijō family. Descended from Ichijō Akiyoshi. Agnatic descendants are still extant. It is one of the Kobetsu Sekke, three of the Five Regent Houses, established during the Edo period by male members of the imperial family through adoption and succession, and their male descendants. Had no right to succession to the imperial throne.
      - Hachijōnomiya. Descended from Toshihito, the first Prince. Extinct in 1662 with the death of his first son, the second Prince. However, his second son, who was a priest, would survive until 1693. The house continued with adoptions and name changes until 1881.
        - Hirotada clan of the Masayoshino Genji. Founded by the first Prince's third son, Hirotada Tadayuki, who was adopted away. His death in 1669 without a biological son made the Hirotada clan no longer associated with the Imperial Family, unlike the Kobetsu Sekke. He was also the last to be given the name Minamoto.
  - Fushimi-no-miya. Descended from Sadatsune, the fourth Prince of Fushimi.
    - Ando clan. Founded by the runaway son, Kunishige, of the seventh Prince. Perhaps extinct with the death of Andō Ryōō in 1637.
    - 10 generations skipped up to Sadayoshi, the nineteenth prince of Fushimi.
      - Fushimi-no-Miya. All descended from Kuniie, the twentieth prince of Fushimi.
        - Yamashina-no-miya. Descended from Prince Yamashina Akira, the first son. Extinct in 1987 with the death of Prince Yamashina Takehiko. His younger brother, Marquis Yoshimaro Yamashina, who died in 1989, had lost his imperial status in 1920.
          - Marquis Tsukuba. Founded by Tsukuba Fujimaro in 1928. Lineage extant. Had no right to succession to the imperial throne.
          - Count Kashima. Founded by Kashima Hagimaro in 1928. He died in 1932, leaving no issue. Count Kashima would continue with his adopted son. Had no right to succession to the imperial throne.
          - Count Katsuragi. Founded by Katsuragi Shigemaro. Lineage extant.
        - Kuni-no-miya. Founded by Prince Kuni Asahiko, the fourth son, in 1871. Lineage extant.
          - Kaya-no-miya. Founded by Prince Kaya Kuninori in 1896 as a personal title and in 1900 as a collateral branch. Lineage extant.
          - Marquis Kuni. Founded by Kuni Kunihisa in 1923. He died without issue in 1935. The title was continued by his nephew through his younger sister.
          - Count Higashifushimi. Founded by Higashifushimi Kunihide. Lineage extant. Had no right to succession to the imperial throne.
          - Nashimoto-no-miya. Started with Prince Nashimoto Morimasa. Extinct with his death in 1951. Continued with the adoption of Count Tatsuda.
          - Count Uji. Founded by Prince Iehiko in 1942. Lineage extant. Had no right to succession to the imperial throne.
          - Count Tatsuda. Founded by Prince Norihiko in 1943. Lineage extant with only Tatsuta Yoshimitsu, born 1980, left and had no right to succession to the imperial throne.
          - Asaka-no-miya. Founded by Prince Yasuhiko Asaka in 1906.
          - Higashikuni-no-miya. Founded by Prince Naruhiko Higashikuni in 1906.
            - Marquis Awata. Founded by Prince Akitsune in 1940. Lineage extant. Had no right to succession to the imperial throne.
            - Count Tarama. Founded by Prince Toshihiko in 1943. Lineage extant. Had no right to succession to the imperial throne.
        - Kitashirakawa-no-miya. Founded by Prince Kitashirakawa Satonari, hirteenth son of Prince Kuniie, in 1872. His death in the same year means that he was succeeded by his older brother, Prince Kitashirakawa Yoshihisa, the second head and ninth son of Prince Kuniie. Extinct in 2018 with Prince Kitashirakawa Yoshihisa's great grandson death.
          - Takeda-no-miya. Founded by Prince Takeda Tsunehisa in 1906.
          - Marquis Komatsu. Founded by Teruhisa Komatsu in 1910. Lineage extant. However had no right to succession to the imperial throne.
          - Count Futara. Founded by Count Futara Yoshiyuki, an illegitimate son of Prince Kitashirakawa Yoshihisa. He was, however, recognised by Emperor Meiji. He died in 1909, leaving no issue. However, the title was succeeded by his brother-in-law.
          - Count Ueno. Founded by Count Ueno Masao, also an illegitimate son of Prince Kitashirakawa Yoshihisa. He was, however, recognised by Emperor Meiji. Unclear fate for the descendants.
        - Kachō-no-miya. Founded by Prince Kachō Hirotsune, twelfth son, in 1868. Extinct with the death of his son in 1883. The house continued with Prince Kachō Hirotsune's grandnephew, Kachō Hironobu.
        - Fushimi-no-miya. Descended from Prince Fushimi Sadanaru, the fourteenth son (but the only surviving from his principal wife). The only living member is Hiroaki Fushimi, who has only daughters.
          - Kachō-no-miya. Descended from Kachō Hironobu. Lineage extant, however, demoted to Marquis and had no right to succession to the imperial throne.
        - Count Kiyosu Ienori, the fifteenth son. Became a count on 28 June 1888. Lineage extant with Ukyō, the 29th head priest of Bukkoji Temple. Had no right to succession to the imperial throne.
        - Kan'in-no-miya. Started by Kotohito, the sixteenth son of Prince Kuniie and sixth Prince Kan'in, with his adoption by Emperor Kōmei in 1872. Extinct in 1988 with the death of his son, Prince Kan'in Haruhito, the seventh Prince Kan'in.
        - Komatsu-no-miya or Higashifumi-no-miya. Started by Prince Komatsu Akihito, the eighth son, in 1867. Extinct with his death in 1903. Restarted by his brother, Prince Higashifushimi Yorihito, the seventeenth son of Prince Kuniie, in the same year. Extinct again in 1922.
      - Nashimoto-no-miya. Founded in 1870 by Moriosa, the first Prince of Nashimoto. Extinct with his death without issue in 1885. The house continued on with adoption until 1951.

Simplified tree, with extinct branches removed.

- Sadafusa, third Prince of Fushimi-no-miya. The most recent common ancestor in the paternal line of the current Imperial family and its former collateral branches.
  - Main Line. Descended from Emperor Go-Yōzei.
    - Naohito, first Prince Kan'in. Son of Emperor Higashiyama
      - Takatsukasa family. Had no right to succession to the imperial throne.
      - Imperial Family.
    - Konoe family. Had no right to succession to the imperial throne.
    - Ichijō family. Had no right to succession to the imperial throne.
  - Fushimi-no-miya. Descended from Sadatsune, the fourth Prince of Fushimi.
    - 10 generations skipped up to Sadayoshi, the nineteenth prince of Fushimi.
      - Fushimi-no-Miya. All descended from Kuniie, the twentieth prince of Fushimi.
        - Yamashina-no-miya main-line. Had gone extinct in 1987.
          - Marquis Tsukuba. Had no right to succession to the imperial throne.
          - Count Katsuragi. Had no right to succession to the imperial throne.
        - Kuni-no-miya.
          - Kaya-no-miya.
          - Count Higashifushimi. Had no right to succession to the imperial throne.
          - Count Uji. Had no right to succession to the imperial throne.
          - Count Tatsuda. Had no right to succession to the imperial throne.
          - Asaka-no-miya.
          - Higashikuni-no-miya.
            - Marquis Awata. Had no right to succession to the imperial throne.
            - Count Tarama. Had no right to succession to the imperial throne.
        - Kitashirakawa-no-miya main-line. Extinct in 2018.
          - Takeda-no-miya.
          - Marquis Komatsu. Had no right to succession to the imperial throne.
          - Count Ueno. Unclear fate for the descendants. Had no right to succession to the imperial throne.
        - Fushimi-no-miya main-line. Descended from Prince Fushimi Sadanaru. The only living member is Hiroaki Fushimi, who has only daughters.
          - Kachō-no-miya. Lineage extant, however, demoted to Marquis and had no right to succession to the imperial throne.
        - Count Kiyosu Ienori. Had no right to succession to the imperial throne.

These cadet royal families lost membership in the Imperial Family by the American Occupation Authorities in October 1947, as part of the abolition of collateral imperial houses and the kazoku (hereditary peerage). Basically, what remained is Fushimi cadet branch (Shinnōke), which itself consists of a main branch and five extant sub-branches (Ōke). There are still unofficial heads of the living collateral families. These are the living Kyū-Miyake (旧宮家, "former Miyake"): The Kyu-miyake and the Kobetsu Sekke both still figure in the Japanese imperial succession debate.

== Finances of the Imperial Family ==
=== Background ===
The Japanese monarchy was considered to be among the wealthiest in the world until the end of World War II. Before 1911, there was no distinction between the Imperial Crown Estates and the Emperor's personal properties. When the Imperial Property Law was enacted in January 1911, two categories were established namely hereditary (crown estates) and personal property of the Imperial Family. The Imperial Household Minister had the responsibility for observing any judicial proceedings concerning Imperial holdings. According to the law, Imperial properties were only taxable if there was no conflict with the Imperial House Law. However, crown estates could only be used for public or imperially-sanctioned undertakings. Personal properties of certain members of the Imperial Family, such as Empress Dowager, the Empress, Crown Prince and Crown Princess, the Imperial Grandson and the consort of the Imperial Grandson, in addition to properties held for Imperial Family members who were minors, were exempted from taxation.

Up to 1921, the Imperial Crown Estates comprised 1,112,535.58 acres (450,227.18 ha). In 1921, due to the poor economic situation in Japan, 289,259.25 acres (117,059.07 ha) of crown lands (26%) were sold or transferred to the Japanese government and the private sector. In 1930, the Nagoya Detached Palace (Nagoya Castle) was donated to the city of Nagoya and six other imperial villas were sold or donated. In 1939, Nijō Castle was donated to the city of Kyoto. The former Kyoto residence of the Tokugawa shogunate which became an imperial palace in the Meiji Restoration, was donated to the city of Kyoto.

At the end of 1935, the Imperial Court owned 3,111,965 acres (1,259,368 ha) landed estates according to official government figures. 2,599,548 acres (1,052,000 ha) of that was the Emperor's private lands. The total landholdings of the crown estates was 512,161 acres (207,264 ha). It comprised palace complexes, forest and farm lands and other residential and commercial properties. The total economic value of the Imperial properties was estimated at ¥650 million in 1935 which is approximately US$195 million at prevailing exchange rates and $19.9 billion as of 2017. (Note: (¥650 million was worth $195 million in 1935 and $19.9 billion as of 2017 https://www.measuringworth.com/calculators/uscompare/ Archived 2018-10-22 at the Wayback Machine)) Emperor Shōwa's personal fortune was an additional hundreds of millions of yen (estimated over $6 billion as of 2017). It included numerous family heirlooms and furnishings, purebred livestock and investments in major Japanese firms, such as the Bank of Japan, other major Japanese banks, the Imperial Hotel and Nippon Yusen.

After World War II, all of the 11 collateral branches of the Imperial Family were abolished under the Allied occupation of Japan, and the subsequent constitutional reforms imposed under Allied supervision forced those families to sell their assets to private or government owners. Staff numbers of the Imperial Household Ministry were slashed from roughly 6000 to about 1000. The Imperial Estates and the Emperor's personal fortune (then estimated at $17.15 million in 1946, or roughly $270.70 million as of 2023) were transferred to state or private ownership with the exception of 6,810 acres (2,760 ha) of landholdings. The largest imperial divestments were the former imperial Kiso and Amagi forest lands in Gifu and Shizuoka prefectures, grazing lands for livestock in Hokkaido and a stock farm in the Chiba region. They were all transferred to the Ministry of Agriculture, Forestry and Fisheries. Imperial property holdings were further reduced since 1947 after several handovers to the government. When Emperor Shōwa died, he left a personal fortune of £11 million in 1989. In 2017, Emperor Akihito had an estimated net worth of US$40 million.

=== Property ===
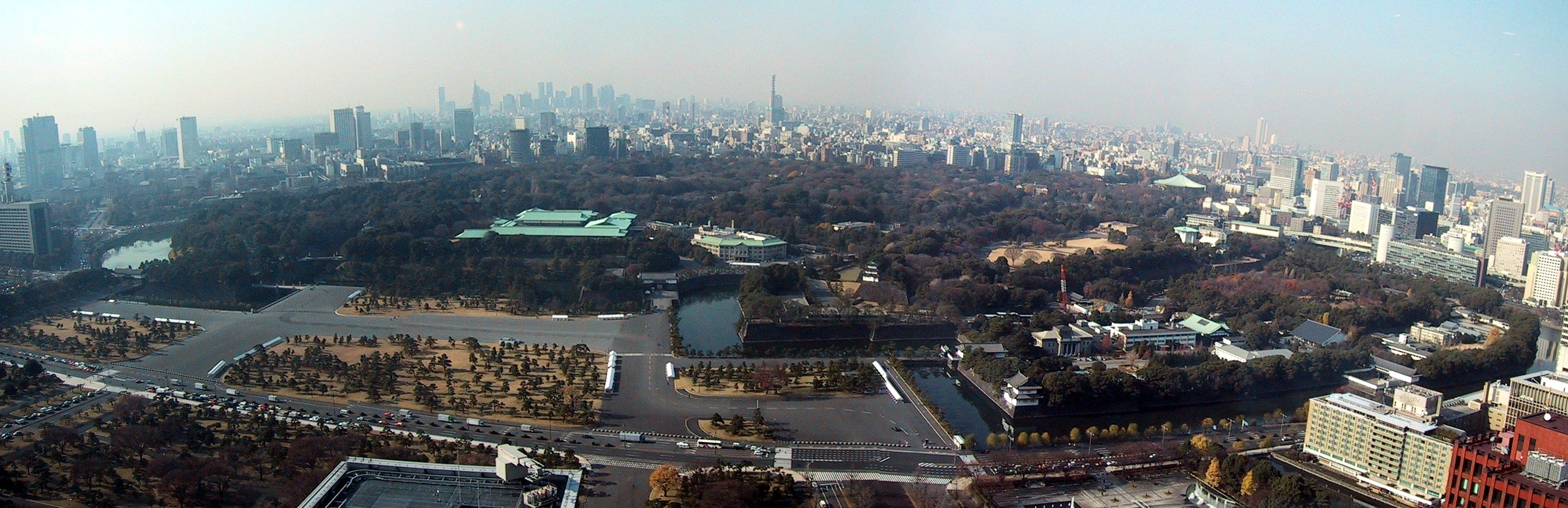
Panorama of the Tokyo Imperial Palace

Currently the primary Imperial properties are the Tokyo Imperial Palace and the Kyoto Imperial Palace. The estimated landholdings are 6,810 acres (2,760 ha). The Tōgū Palace is located in the larger Akasaka Estate where numerous other Imperial Family members reside. There are privately used imperial villas in Hayama, Nasu and the Suzaki Imperial Villa in Shimoda. The Katsura Imperial Villa, Shugakuin Imperial Villa and Sentō Imperial Palace are in Kyoto. There are a number of Imperial farms, residences and game preserves. The Imperial Household Agency administers the Shosoin Imperial Repository in Nara. The Imperial properties are all owned by the State.

=== Budget ===
The Emperor can spend £150 million of public money annually. The imperial palaces are all owned and paid for by the State.

Until 2003, facts about the Japanese Imperial Family's life and finances were kept secret behind the "Chrysanthemum Curtain." Yohei Mori (former royal correspondent for the Mainichi Shimbun and assistant professor of journalism at Seijo University) revealed details about finances of the Imperial Family in his book based on 200 documents that were published with the public information law.

=== Staff ===
The Japanese Imperial Family has a staff of more than 1,000 people (47 servants per royal). This includes a 24-piece traditional orchestra (gagaku) with 1,000 year-old instruments such as the koto and the shō, 30 gardeners, 25 chefs, 40 chauffeurs as well as 78 builders, plumbers and electricians. There are 30 archaeologists to protect the 895 imperial tombs. There is a silkworm breeder of the Momijiyama Imperial Cocoonery. The Emperor has four doctors on standby 24 hours a day, five men manage his wardrobe and 11 assist in Shinto rites.

The Imperial Palace in Tokyo has 160 servants who maintain it. This is partly due to demarcation rules, such as a maid who wipes a table cannot also wipe the floor. There are also separate stewards in charge of handling silverware and the crystal. The Kyoto Imperial Palace has a staff of 78 people. There are also 67 who care for the horses at the Tochigi ranch. There are scores of additional staff for the summer palaces at the beach and in the mountains.

=== Expenditure ===
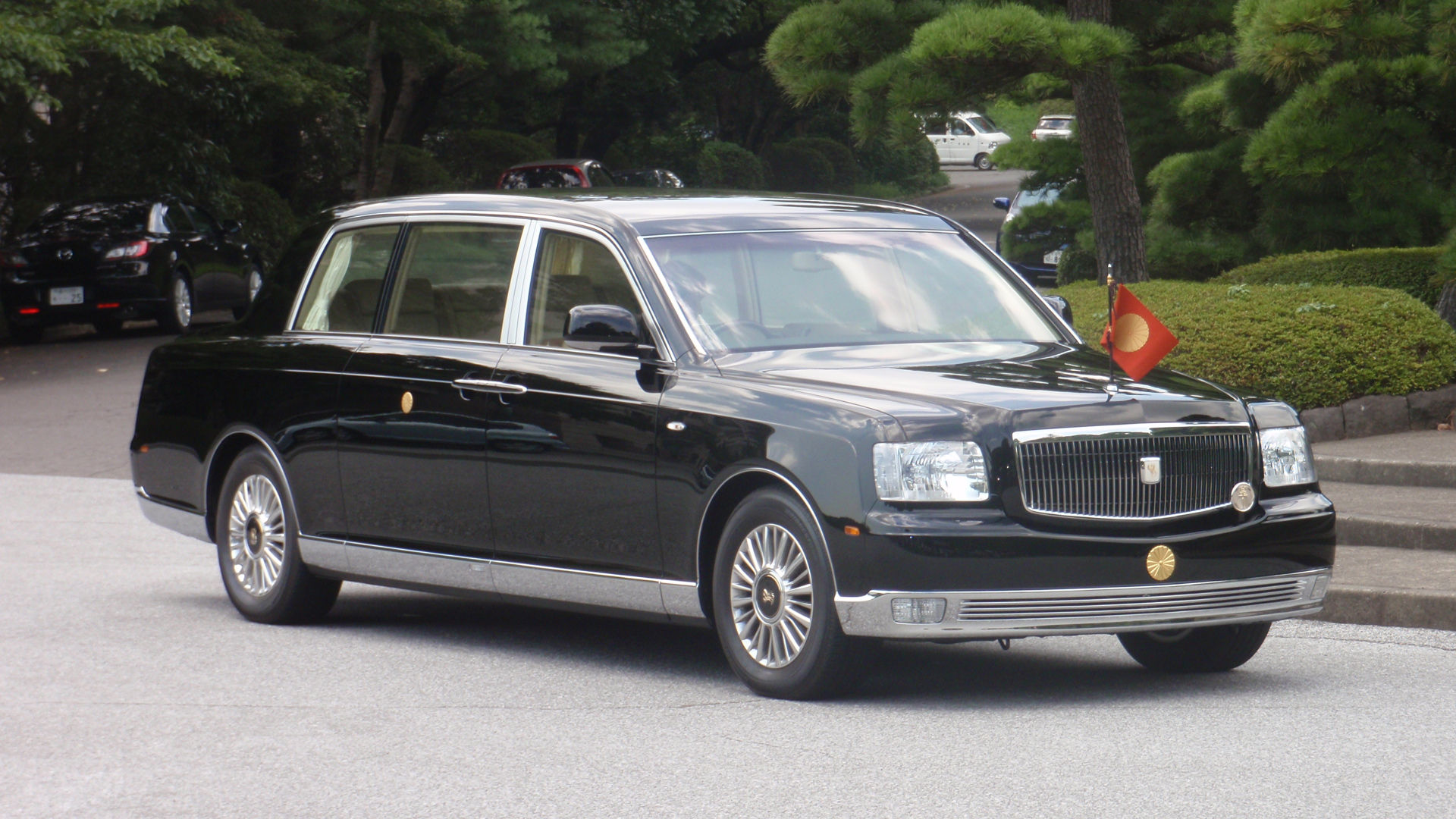
Imperial official vehicle, Toyota Century Royal "Empress 1".

The Imperial Palace has a £2 million-a-year clinic with 42 staff and 8 medical departments. An example of lavish spending is the prior redecoration of a room for £140,000 where Crown Princess Masako gave birth to Princess Aiko in 2001. Emperor Akihito spent £140,000 on building a wine cellar. It has 4,500 bottles of 11 types of white wine and seven types of red such as Chateau Mouton Rothschild (1982) and champagne Dom Perignon (1992).

The Imperial properties includes a 622 acres (252 ha) farm which supplies produce and meat for the Imperial Family. The farm costs were £3 million per year as of 2003; the emperor and his family had a monthly water bill of approximately £50,000, also as of 2003.

The Imperial Guard is a special over 900 strong police force that provides personal protection for the Emperor and other members of the Imperial Family including their residences for £48 million per year.

The Imperial Household owns and operates a fleet of Toyota Century motor vehicles, designated "Empresses", for exclusive use of the Imperial Household. In 2006, the Imperial Household Agency took delivery of the first of four bespoke Toyota Century Royals. The first of these specially prepared vehicles, Empress 1, serve as the official state car of the Emperor. Two Century Royals, Empress 3 and Empress 5, were assigned to the Ministry of Foreign Affairs for special use by visiting dignitaries and foreign heads of state. The last, Empress 2, was built in 2008 as a hearse exclusively for imperial funerals. Despite the imperial family's extravagant expenditures, there is a limitation with travel expenses since the Emperor's entourage pays a maximum of £110 a night, regardless of the actual cost of the hotel. Hotels accept it since they regard it as an honour to host the Imperial Family.

Aside from the inner court (the Emperor and Empress, and their children including the Crown Prince and Crown Princess), the civil list covers additional family members who live in imperial residences. They are not prohibited from holding jobs or running businesses. For example, Prince Tomohito of Mikasa, his wife and two daughters received £310,000 per year, but they are not well known by the Japanese public and have had few imperial duties.

The real annual cost was estimated to be $325 million per year, also as of 2003.

== Involvement in war ==
=== World War II ===
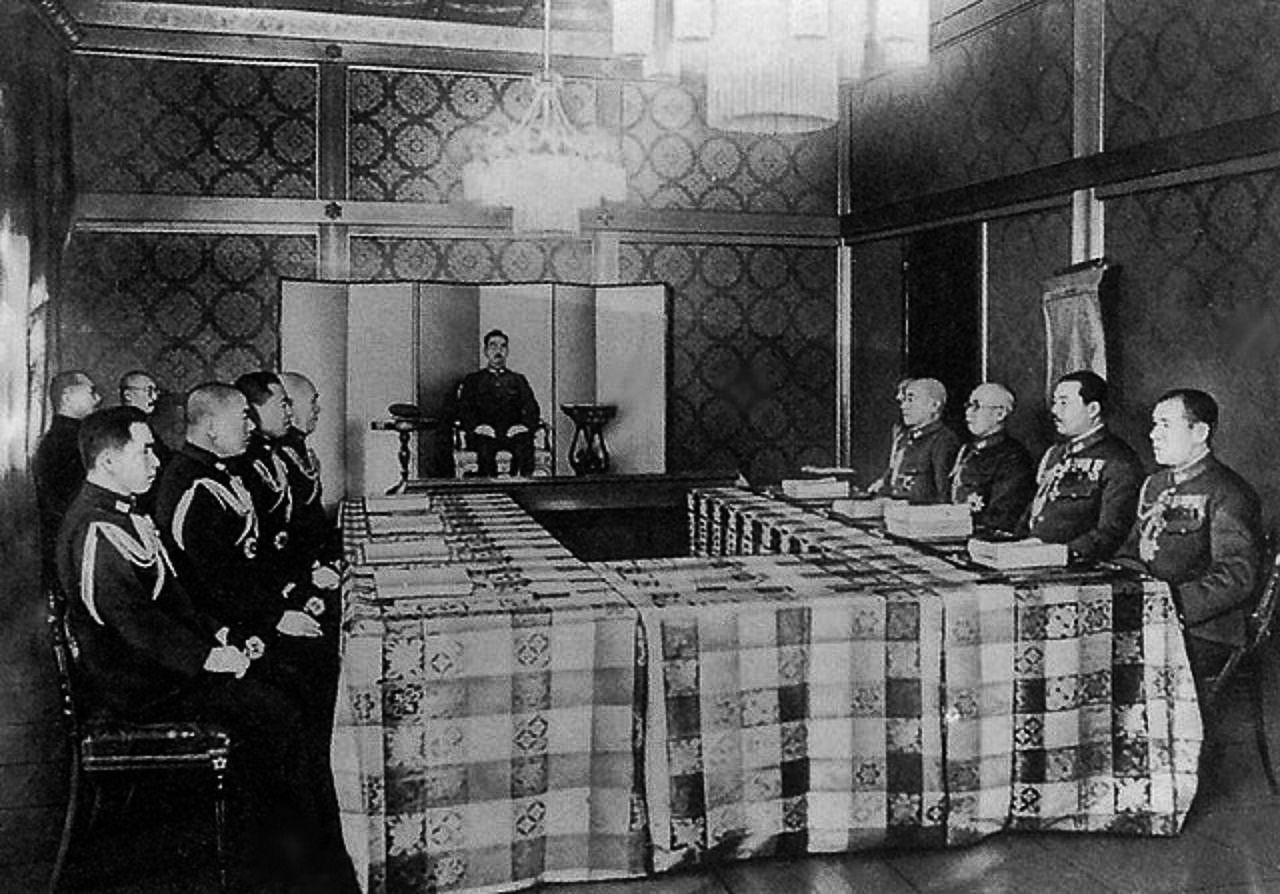
Emperor Shōwa as head of the Imperial General Headquarters on 29 April 1943

Members of the imperial family, including Naruhiko, Prince Higashikuni, Yasuhito, Prince Chichibu, Takahito, Prince Mikasa and Tsuneyoshi, Prince Takeda, were involved in unethical human experimentation programs in various ways, which included authorizing, funding, supplying, and inspecting biomedical facilities.

Since 1978, the Emperors of Japan (Emperor Shōwa, Akihito and Naruhito) have never visited Yasukuni Shrine due to Emperor Shōwa's displeasure over the enshrinement of convicted Class-A war criminals.

== Support ==
A 1997 survey by Asahi Shimbun showed that 82% of Japanese supported the continuation of the monarchy. Polls after showed 1/3 of respondents were "indifferent" towards it. The imperial system is considered a symbol of the country, it provides a sense of linkage, purpose, spiritual core, diplomatic role as ambassador and a source of tradition and stability. A small percentage argue that the imperial system is out of date, not in synchrony with the contemporary times.

== Imperial standards currently in use ==
Imperial Standard of the Emperor (tennō)

Imperial Standard of the Emperor Emeritus (jōkō)

Imperial Standard of the Empress (kōgō)

Imperial Standard of the Crown Prince (kōshi)

Imperial Standard of a member of the Imperial House

== See also ==
- Akasaka Palace
- Family tree of Japanese monarchs
- Ie (Japanese family system)
- Imperial Regalia of Japan
- Kyoto Imperial Palace
- List of emperors of Japan
- Three Palace Sanctuaries
- Tokyo Imperial Palace

=== Related terms ===
- Shinnōke
  - Fushimi
    - Ōke
  - Arisugawa
  - Kan'in
  - Katsura

== Notes ==
Imperial House Imperial House of Japan
First ruling house	Ruling House of Japan; 539 AD–present	Incumbent
