= Emperor Abdication Law =

2017 Japanese law

Emperor Abdication Special Law

National Diet
- Long title: The Law for Special Exception of the Imperial House Law concerning Abdication, etc. of Emperor
- Citation: Law No. 63 of Heisei 29
- Enacted by: House of Representatives
- Enacted: 2 June 2017
- Enacted by: House of Councillors
- Enacted: 9 June 2017
- Effective: 16 June 2017
- Administered by: Cabinet Secretariat; Imperial Household Agency

Legislative history

Initiating chamber: House of Representatives
- Bill title: The Bill for Special Exception of the Imperial House Law concerning Abdication, etc. of Emperor
- Introduced: 19 May 2017

Amends
- Imperial Household Law, Imperial Household Agency Law, Public Holiday Law

Related legislation
- Constitution of Japan, etc.

Summary
- To enact exemptions for the abdication of Akihito, the 125th Emperor of Japan
- Status: Current legislation

The Law for Special Exception of the Imperial House Law concerning Abdication, etc. of Emperor (天皇の退位等に関する皇室典範特例法), or in short Emperor Abdication Special Law (天皇退位特例法), is a Japanese law enacted for the abdication of Akihito, the 125th emperor of Japan.

The special law was enacted by the National Diet on 9 June 2017 after both houses passed the legislation. The law partially came into effect on 16 June 2017, and fully in effect on 1 May 2019 after the accession and enthronement of the new emperor, Naruhito.

== Background ==
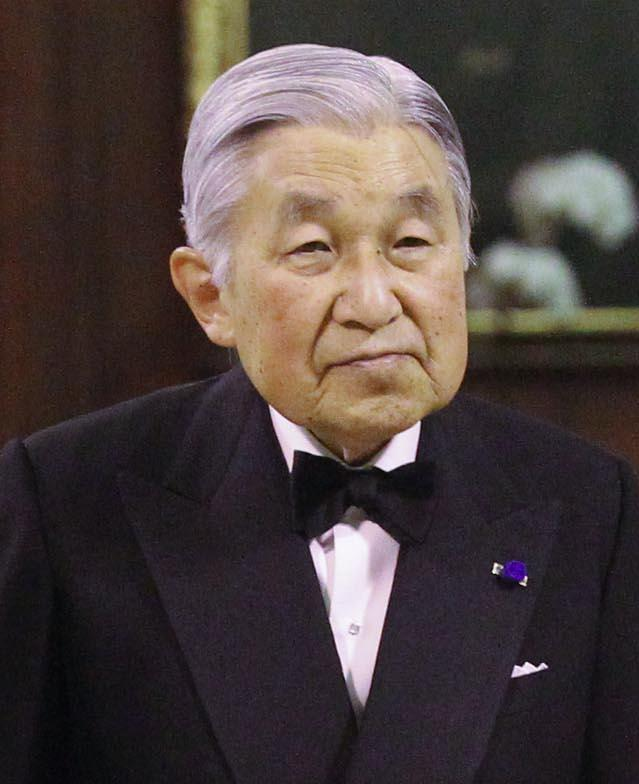
Emperor Akihito in 2016

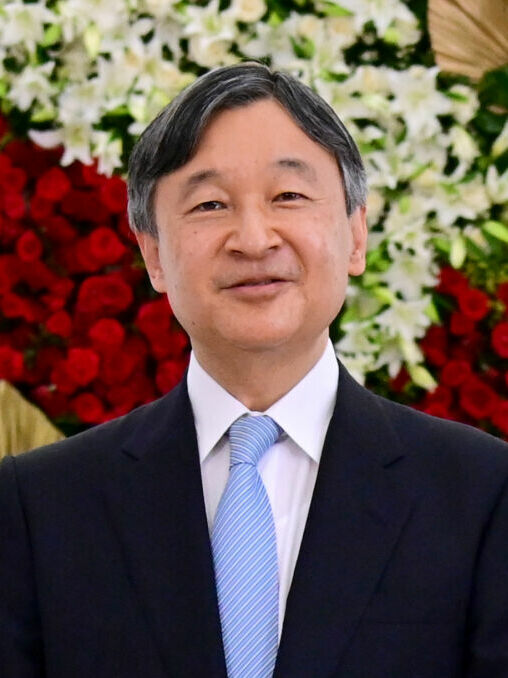
Emperor Naruhito in 2023

According to the Imperial Household Law, the Emperor is "on throne until death". The Abdication Law, however, provides legal basis for the abdication of Akihito and the accession of his elder son, Crown Prince Naruhito, and was described by the Chief Cabinet Secretary as "setting up precedents for the future".

Akihito reportedly revealed his intention to abdicate on 22 July 2010 in a Palace Meeting, admitting his parents' illnesses in their later years, including cancer of Emperor Hirohito and dementia of Empress Nagako, had impacted him hugely.

NHK, a major Japanese public broadcaster, reported on 13 July 2016 and citing officials of Imperial Household Agency, that "His Majesty the Emperor had expressed his intention to abdicate for Crown Prince Naruhito in the coming few years". The Agency initially rejected the report as "impossible" and "unrealistic".

On 8 August, the Emperor made his second-ever televised address to the public. Akihito said his declining health means it is difficult to fulfil his duties, which strongly indicated his wish to abdicate as he was barred from making political statements according to the constitution. Prime Minister Shinzo Abe said the government would take the remarks seriously and discuss what could be done.

== Legislation ==
The cabinet convened 14 meetings on "reducing the burden of Emperor's duties" in 2016 and 2017. On 21 April 2017, the final report of the meetings was published which recommended the enactment of new law by the National Diet. The proposed bill would allow Akihito to abdicate and be conferred the title of "Emperor Emeritus", while Empress Michiko, wife of Akihito, will be called "Empress Emeritus". Both will retain the title of "Majesty". The Imperial Household Agency will be reformed by creating "Department of Emperor Emeritus" and "Department of Crown Prince".

All parliamentary parties were invited to send representatives over drafting of the bill by virtue of Article 1 of the Constitution, which said "The Emperor shall be the symbol of the State and of the unity of the People, deriving his position from the will of the people with whom resides sovereign power."

The bill was agreed by the cabinet in the meeting on 19 May 2017, and was sent to the National Diet on the same day. Following discussion in a committee of the House of Representatives on 1 June, the bill was passed in the House of Representatives with a simple majority on the next day - noticeably that no independent member or parties indicate objection.

The House of Councillors, the upper house, then established the "Special Bills Committee on the Law for Special Exception of the Imperial House Law concerning Abdication, etc. of Emperor" for further discussion. The Councillors passed the bill on 9 June without objection, but the Liberal Party abstained from the vote, saying the abdication should be handled by the amendment to the Imperial Household Law. The law came into effect on 16 June.

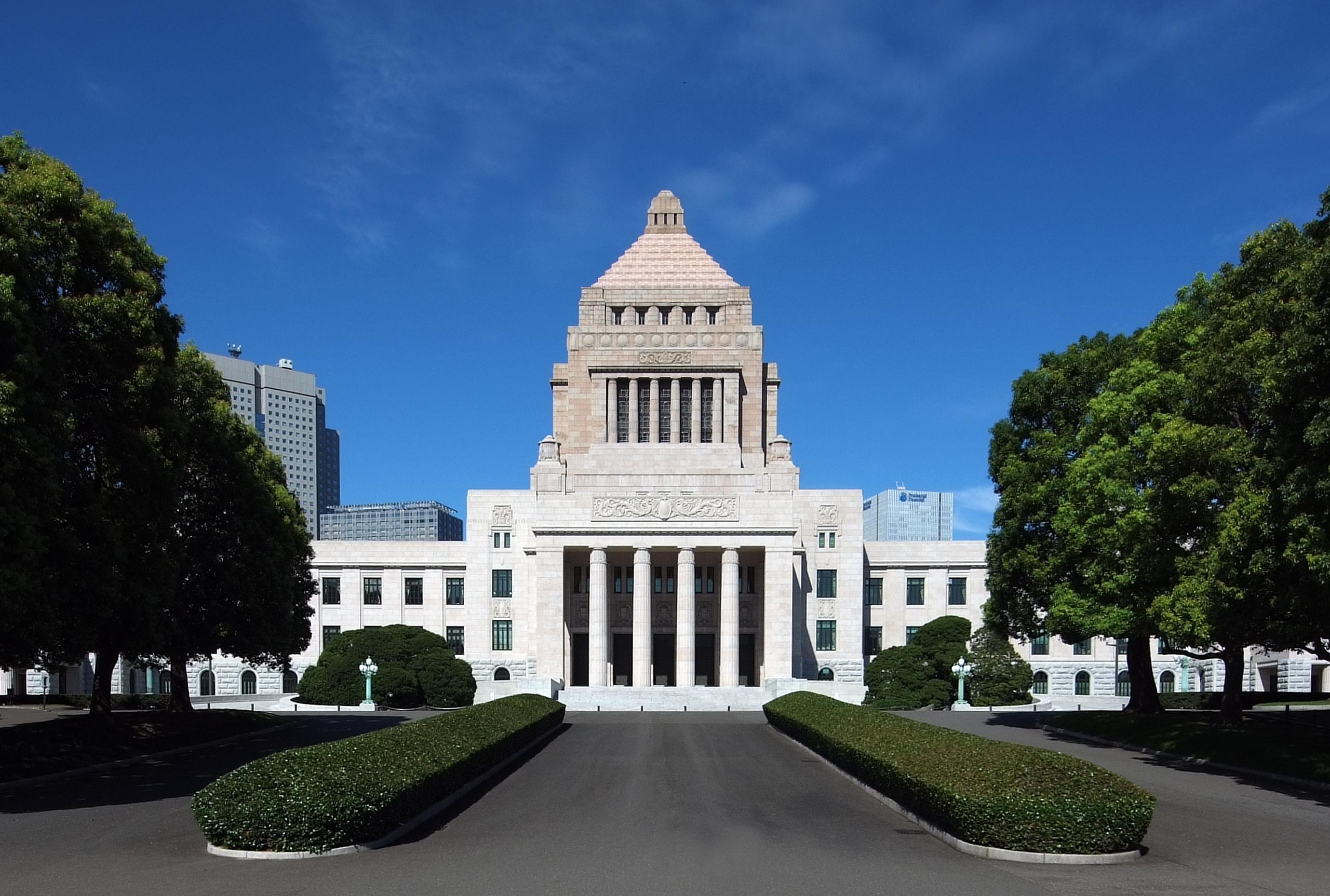
National Diet Building

Bill for Special Exception of the Imperial House Law concerning Abdication, etc. of Emperor House of Representatives vote
Party	Votes for	Votes against	Abstained/Absent
LDP (291)	291	–	–
Democratic (95)	95	–	–
Komeito (35)	35	–	–
JCP (21)	21	–	–
Ishin (15)	15	–	–
Liberal (2)	–	–	2
Social Democratic (2)	2	–	–
Independents (13)	10	3	–
Total (474)	469	3	2

Bill for Special Exception of the Imperial House Law concerning Abdication, etc. of Emperor House of Councillors vote
Party	Votes for	Votes against	Abstained/Absent
LDP (126)	125	–	1
Democratic (50)	49	–	1
Komeito (25)	25	–	–
JCP (14)	14	–	–
Ishin (12)	12	–	–
Liberal (4)	–	–	4
Social Democratic (2)	2	–	–
Independent Club (4)	4	–	–
Okinawa no kaze (2)	2	–	–
Independents (3)	2	–	1
Total (242)	235	0	7

A resolution was included in the bill, which confirmed "the Government will take into account the shrinking of the imperial family, and will consider various measures regarding the imperial succession, including the establishment of female palace, and to timely report to the National Diet."

The opposition party, the Constitutional Democratic Party, formed a study group on studying the possibility of absolute primogeniture (i.e. to allow female succession to the crown) and to make abdication procedures permanent.

== Subsequent decisions ==
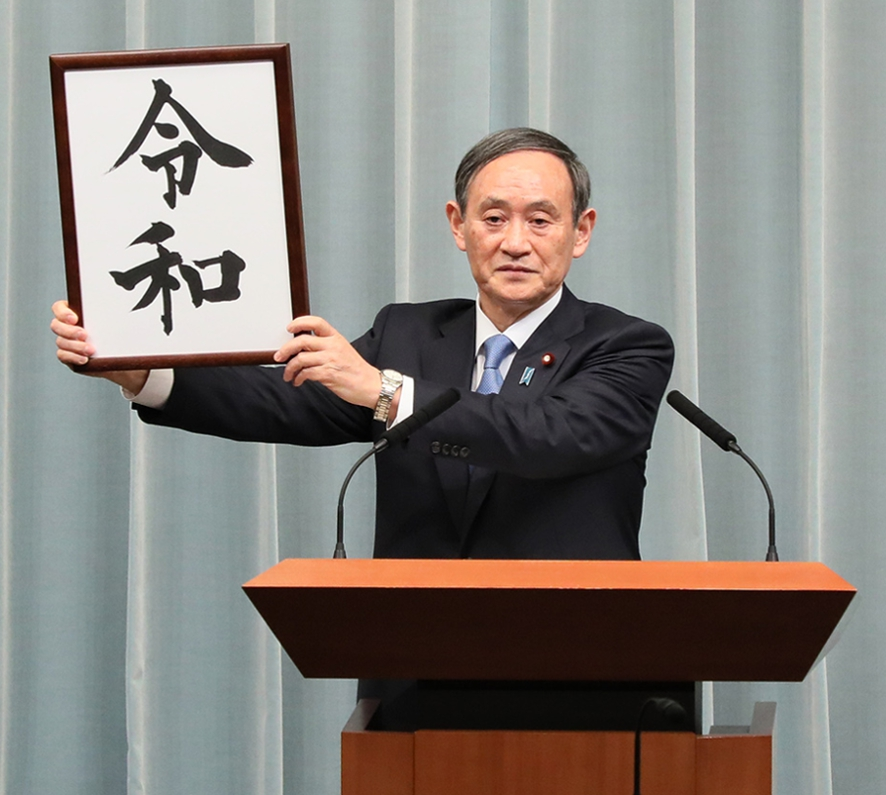
"Reiwa", the new era name, announced by Yoshihide Suga, Chief Cabinet Secretary (1 April 2019)

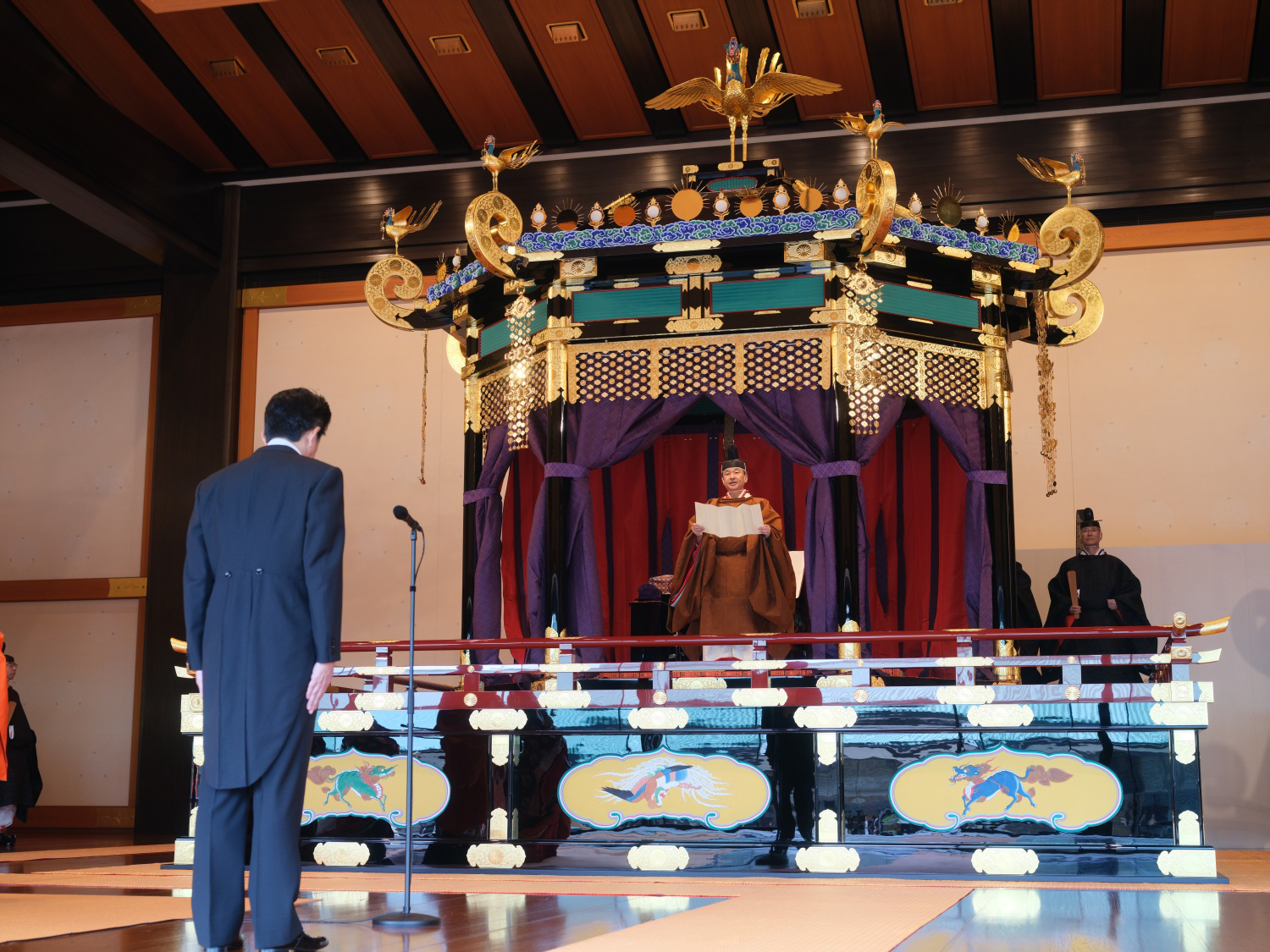
Enthronement ceremony of Naruhito as Emperor of Japan (22 October 2019)

Following the passage of bill into law, the Government started planning the timeline of the abdication and to decide on the new era name.

On 1 December 2017, the Imperial Household Council decided the abdication of Emperor Akihito will take place on 30 April 2019.

Members of the Imperial Household Council (on 1 December 2017) below:

- Shinzo Abe (Prime Minister) - Chairperson
- Masahito, Prince Hitachi (Member of Japanese Imperial Family)
- Hanako, Princess Hitachi (Member of Japanese Imperial Family)
- Tadamori Ōshima (Speaker of the House of Representatives)
- Chūichi Date (President of the House of Councillors)
- Hirotaka Akamatsu (Vice Speaker of the House of Representatives)
- Akira Gunji (Vice President of the House of Councillors)
- Itsuro Terada (Chief Justice of the Supreme Court)
- Kiyoko Okabe (Justice of the Supreme Court of Japan)
- Shinichiro Yamamoto (Grand Steward of Imperial Household Agency)
- Some other members of the National Diet

The date of 31 March 2019 was at one point considered for the abdication of Akihito, with the accession on the next day, but this plan was abandoned because of the potential political impact by the local elections.

The Third Abe Cabinet agreed on the abdication date on 8 December 2017, and the decree was gazetted on 13 December. The decree which provides legal basis for the abdication ceremony was also promulgated on 9 March 2018 after cabinet's decision on 6 March.

On 1 April 2019, the cabinet decided on the details of the announcement of the new era name, and that the new era name would come into effect on 1 May 2019 with the accession to the throne of Naruhito, Akihito's eldest son. Crown Prince Naruhito became the 126th Emperor at midnight on 1 May 2019, and the era name was changed from Heisei to Reiwa simultaneously.

== Provisions ==
Section 1 (Preamble) provides the background information of Emperor Akihito, which includes his health issues and the necessity of abdication.

Section 2 (Abdication of Emperor and Succession by Crown Prince) stipulates that the abdication of Akihito and succession by his eldest son, Crown Prince Naruhito will happen on "enforcement date".

Section 3 (Emperor Emeritus) and Section 4 (Empress Emeritus) stipulate, respectively, the title of Emperor Akihito and Empress Michiko after abdication.

Section 5 (Crown Prince after succession to the throne) confers the title of crown prince to Fumihito, Naruhito's brother.

The annexes of the law provides further details in connection with the abdication, including the enforcement and expiry date of the law, application of laws related to Emperor and Empress Emeritus and the finance of the Imperial Family, taxation, exemption of public consultation, amendment to the Imperial Household, Public Holiday Law and Imperial Household Agency Law.
