= Mikasa-no-miya =

Branch of Japanese imperial family

Mikasa-no-miya 三笠宮家
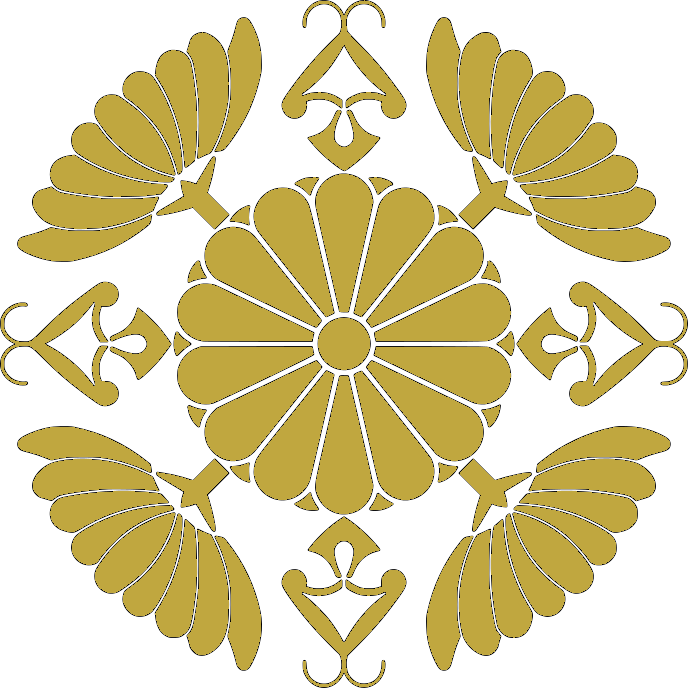
- Home province: Tokyo
- Parent house: Imperial House of Japan
- Titles: Prince Mikasa; Princess Mikasa
- Founder: Takahito, Prince Mikasa
- Current head: Princess Akiko
- Founding year: 1935
- Cadet branches: Katsura-no-miya; Takamado-no-miya

The Mikasa-no-miya is a branch of the Japanese imperial family.

== Overview ==
The Mikasa-no-miya was established on December 2, 1935, when Emperor Shōwa granted Prince Takahito the title of Prince Mikasa, along with permission to establish a new branch of the Imperial Family on the occasion of his 20th birthday and coming of age ceremony.

Upon Prince Mikasa's death in 2016, his wife Princess Mikasa assumed leadership of the family. Following her death in November 2024, the position of head of the family was left vacant until September 2025, when it was decided that Princess Akiko would succeed to the position. On this occasion, her mother, Princess Nobuko left the Mikasa household, establishing the Princess Tomohito of Mikasa household.

=== Membership ===
==== Current members ====
Name	Gender	Date of Birth	Age	Lineage	Notes
Princess Akiko of Mikasa	Female	December 20, 1981	44	Eldest daughter of Prince Tomohito of Mikasa	3rd head of the family. Prince Tomohito household reintegrated into Mikasa household in 2013.
Princess Yōko of Mikasa	Female	October 25, 1983	42	Second daughter of Prince Tomohito	

==== Past members ====
Name	Gender	Date of Birth	Age	Year of departure	Reason	Lineage	Notes
Takahito, Prince Mikasa	Male	December 2, 1915		2016	Death	Fourth son of Emperor Taishō	First head of the Mikasa household.
Yuriko, Princess Mikasa	Female	June 4, 1923		2024	Death	Consort of Prince Takahito	Second head of the Mikasa household.
Yasuko Konoe	Female	April 26, 1944	82	1966	Left Imperial Family upon marriage	Eldest daughter of Prince Takahito	
Prince Tomohito of Mikasa	Male	January 5, 1946		1980	Established household within Mikasa household	Eldest son of Prince Takahito	Died in 2012.
Princess Tomohito of Mikasa	Female	April 8, 1955	71	2025	Established Prince Tomohito of Mikasa household independent of Mikasa household	Consort of Prince Tomohito	Prince Tomohito household merged back in 2013.
Yoshihito, Prince Katsura	Male	February 11, 1948		1988	Established Katsura-no-miya household	Second son of Prince Takahito	Died in 2014.
Masako Sen	Female	October 23, 1951	84	1983	Left Imperial Family upon marriage	Second daughter of Prince Takahito	
Norihito, Prince Takamado	Male	December 29, 1954		1984	Established Takamado-no-miya household	Third son of Prince Takahito	Died in 2002.

== Genealogy ==
123rd Emperor of Japan; Emperor Taishō
124th Emperor of Japan; Emperor Shōwa	1st Prince Mikasa; Prince Takahito	2nd House Head; Princess Yuriko
Yasuko Konoe	Prince Tomohito	Princess Nobuko 〔Princess Tomohito of Mikasa household〕	Prince Yoshihito 〔Katsura-no-miya〕	Masako Sen	Prince Norihito 〔Takamado-no-miya〕
3rd House Head; Princess Akiko	Princess Yōko

== Heads of Household ==
Position	Name	Appointed By	Date of Appointment	Ended	Reason	Length	Lineage	Descent
1st	Takahito, Prince Mikasa	Established as head of household by Emperor Showa	December 2, 1935	October 17, 2016	Death	80 years 331 days	Imperial Family	Fourth son of Emperor Taisho.
2nd	Yuriko, Princess Mikasa	Imperial Household Council	November 16, 2016	November 15, 2024	Death	8 years	Non-Imperial Origin	Second daughter of Masanori Takagi. Consort of Prince Takahito.
3rd	Princess Akiko of Mikasa	Imperial Household Council	September 30, 2025	Incumbent			Imperial Family	Eldest daughter of Prince Tomohito.

== Branch families ==
=== Prince Tomohito household ===
Prince Tomohito, the eldest son and heir of Prince Mikasa established his own household on November 7th, 1980, upon his marriage to Nobuko Aso. Unlike other princes of the Imperial Family who found new branches of the household, Prince Tomohito was not granted permission to do so, or a new princely title, as he was expected to eventually inherit the Mikasa household and title of Prince Mikasa.

However, Prince Tomohito predeceased his father, passing away on June 6th, 2012, with no male heir. As a result, the headship of the Prince Tomohito household remained vacant. On June 10th, 2013, the Imperial Household Agency announced that the Prince Tomohito household would be considered abolished retroactively to the date of the prince’s death, and that its remaining members would be reintegrated into the Mikasa household while retaining their staff and imperial allowances. On July 31st of the same year, the former residence of the Prince Tomohito family was renamed the “Mikasa East Palace".

==== Members ====
Name	Gender	Date of Birth	Year of departure	Reason	Lineage	Notes
Prince Tomohito of Mikasa	Male	January 5, 1946	2012	Death	Eldest son of Prince Takahito	Not granted princely title as heir to Mikasa household.
Princess Tomohito of Mikasa (Nobuko)	Female	April 9, 1955	2013	Reintegrated into Mikasa household	Consort of Prince Tomohito	
Princess Akiko of Mikasa	Female	December 20, 1981	2013	Reintegrated into Mikasa household	Eldest daughter of Prince Tomohito	Third head of Mikasa household.
Princess Yōko of Mikasa	Female	October 25, 1983	2013	Reintegrated into Mikasa household	Second daughter of Prince Tomohito	

=== Princess Tomohito of Mikasa household ===
Following the November 2024 death of Princess Mikasa, the Mikasa household was left without a head. However, on September 30th, 2025, it was decided that Princess Akiko of Mikasa would become head of the household.

On this occasion, Princess Nobuko departed the Mikasa household and established the Princess Tomohito of Mikasa household.

Name	Gender	Date of Birth	Relation	Notes
Princess Tomohito of Mikasa (Nobuko)	Female	April 9, 1955	Consort of Prince Tomohito	In 2025, she left the Mikasa household and established the independent Princess Tomohito of Mikasa household.

=== Katsura-no-miya ===
Prince Yoshihito received the title of Prince Katsura and permission to start a new branch of the Imperial Family in 1988. This was somewhat unusual as he never married or had children.

Name	Gender	Date of Birth	Year of Departure	Reason	Lineage	Notes
Yoshihito, Prince Katsura	Male	February 11, 1948	2014	Death	Second son of Prince Takahito	Household abolished upon Prince Katsura's death.

=== Takamado-no-miya ===
Prince Norihito received the title of Prince Takamado and permission to start a new branch of the Imperial Family upon the occasion of his marriage in 1984. The Takamado branch remains extant, although Prince Norihito died in 2002.

Name	Gender	Date of Birth	Year of Departure	Reason	Lineage	Notes
Norihito, Prince Takamado	Male	December 29, 1954	2002	Death	Third son of Prince Takahito	Died in 2002.
Hisako, Princess Takamado	Female	July 10, 1953			Eldest daughter of Shigejiro Tottori	
Princess Tsuguko of Takamado	Female	March 8, 1986			Eldest daughter of Prince Norihito	
Noriko Senge	Female	July 22, 1988	2014	Left Imperial Family upon marriage	Second daughter of Prince Norihito	Left the Imperial Family upon marriage to Kunimaro Senge on May 27, 2014.
Ayako Moriya	Female	September 15, 1990	2018	Left Imperial Family upon marriage	Third daughter of Prince Norihito	Left the Imperial Family upon marriage to Kei Moriya on October 29, 2018.

== Residences ==
The principal residence of the Mikasa household is the Mikasa Palace, located adjacent to the Mikasa East Palace and the Takamado Palace, within the grounds of the Akasaka Estate, in Moto-Akasaka, Tokyo. Completed in 1970, the palace has a floor area of approximately 11,500 square feet across two floors, and served as the official residence of Prince Mikasa and Princess Mikasa from 1970 until their respective deaths in 2016 and 2024. It was vacant following the death of Princess Mikasa, but in September of 2025, it was announced that, in conjunction with Princess Akiko assuming the headship of the Mikasa household, she would move into the Mikasa palace. She moved in to the Mikasa Palace on May 7th, 2026.

The Mikasa East Palace is another residence of the Mikasa family, located on the south side of the Akasaka Estate, adjacent to the Mikasa and Akishino Palaces. Completed in 1982 as the official residence of the Prince Tomohito household, the two story, 7,300 square foot palace contains 15 rooms, plus offices and staff accommodations. While was originally named the Prince Tomohito Residence, it was renamed to the Mikasa East Palace following Prince Tomohito's death in 2012. Princess Akiko and Princess Yōko continued to live there (Princess Nobuko having been living separately since 2003) until May 2026, when Princess Akiko moved into the Mikasa Palace. Princess Yōko continues to reside at the Mikasa East Palace.
