= Sayako Kuroda =

Former Japanese princess (born 1969)

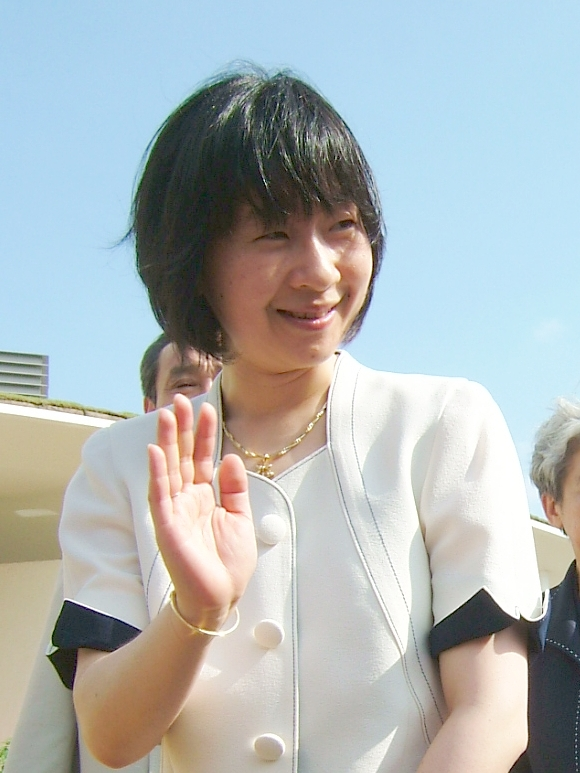
- Sayako at Expo 2005
- Born: Sayako, Princess Nori (紀宮清子内親王); 18 April 1969 (age 57); Imperial Household Agency Hospital, Tokyo Imperial Palace, Chiyoda, Tokyo, Japan
- Occupations: Supreme Priestess of the Ise Grand Shrine; Researcher of Tamagawa University Education Museum
- Spouse: Yoshiki Kuroda (m. 2005)
- Parents: Akihito (father); Michiko Shōda (mother)
- Relatives: Imperial House of Japan

Sayako Kuroda (黒田 清子, Kuroda Sayako; born 18 April 1969), formerly Sayako, Princess Nori (紀宮清子内親王, Nori-no-miya Sayako Naishinnō), is the youngest child and only daughter of Emperor Emeritus Akihito and Empress Emerita Michiko, and the younger sister of the current Emperor of Japan, Naruhito. She is an imperial Shinto priestess of the Ise Grand Shrine, currently serving as the Supreme Priestess.

Kuroda held the appellation "Nori-no-miya" (Princess Nori), until her marriage to Yoshiki Kuroda on 15 November 2005. As a result of her marriage, she gave up her imperial title and left the Japanese imperial family, as required by the Article 12 of the Imperial Household Law, and received a payment of approximately US$1,000,000.

== Education and career ==
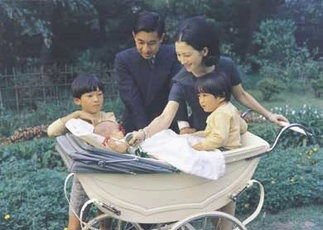
Princess Sayako with her parents and older brothers in 1969

Princess Sayako was born on 18 April 1969 at the Imperial Household Agency Hospital in Tokyo Imperial Palace, Tokyo. Her mother, Empress Emerita Michiko, is an alumna of the University of the Sacred Heart and a convert to Shinto from Roman Catholicism. She first attended Kakinokizaka Kindergarten in 1973, and then Gakushuin school for her primary, junior high, high school and university education, graduated in 1992. Later in the year, she was accepted as research associate at the Yamashina Institute for Ornithology, where she specialized in the study of kingfishers. In 1998, she was appointed researcher at the same institute.

Apart from her research, Sayako has traveled extensively abroad and within Japan, as a representative of the Imperial family.

== Marriage and change in status ==
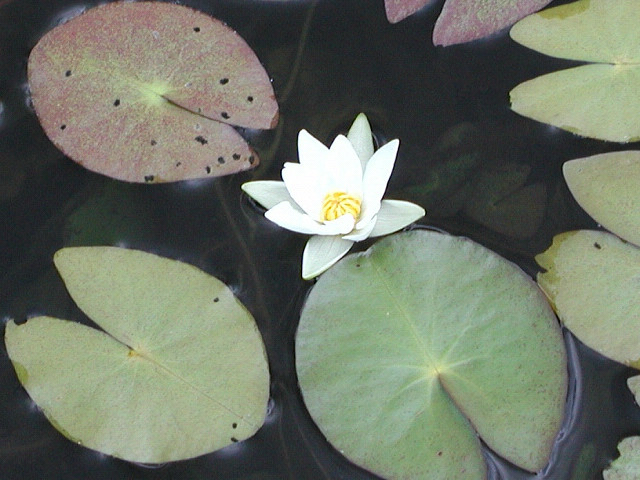
Pygmy waterlily, Nymphaea tetragona, designated imperial personal emblem of Sayako

On 30 December 2004, the Imperial Household Agency announced the engagement of the 35-year-old Princess Nori to the 39-year-old Yoshiki Kuroda (黒田慶樹 Kuroda Yoshiki). Born in Tokyo on 17 April 1965, he is an urban designer with the Tokyo Metropolitan Government and a longtime friend of Prince Akishino. The announcement of the engagement was postponed twice following the 2004 Chūetsu earthquake and the death of Princess Takamatsu. Upon her marriage, which took place at the Imperial Hotel, Tokyo on 15 November 2005, Princess Nori left the Imperial Family, taking the surname of her husband; he became the first non-aristocratic commoner to marry an Imperial princess. This change in her status is mandated by the Imperial Household Law that requires females of the imperial family who marry to relinquish their title, official membership in the imperial family, and allowance from the state. She became the sixth female member born into the Japanese imperial family to marry a commoner since the passage of the Imperial Household Law in 1947, and the first member of the family to lose royal status since the marriage of Princess Masako of Mikasa, one of Emperor Akihito's cousins, in 1983. The law that required Sayako to relinquish her title of nobility was repealed in July 2026. It is not known if such former nobles can be reinstated under this change.

Sayako's parents, Emperor Akihito and Empress Michiko were in attendance at her wedding, as were other members of the imperial family. About 30 people attended the ceremony, and some 120 guests attended the reception including the Governor of Tokyo Shintaro Ishihara. Thousands of well-wishers lined the streets between the royal palace and the city hotel where the half-hour marriage rite took place.

Kuroda resigned from her job as an ornithologist to focus on her family life. While she is no longer entitled to an imperial allowance, she received a wedding gift worth US$1,200,000 from the Japanese government. To prepare for her change of lifestyle, Princess Sayako reportedly took driving lessons and practiced shopping at the supermarket.

== After marriage ==
In April 2012, Kuroda was appointed as a high priestess of the Ise Grand Shrine to assist her aunt, Atsuko Ikeda, Chief Priestess of the shrine, who was also subjected to the conditions of the Imperial Household Law upon marriage. She was among the guests during a banquet held at the Tokyo Imperial Palace in honour of King Philippe and Queen Mathilde of Belgium in October 2016. Since her marriage, Kuroda has continued to appear on some formal occasions with other members of the Imperial Family. She officially replaced Atsuko Ikeda as the supreme priestess of Ise Shrine on 19 June 2017.

For the coming-of-age of her niece, Aiko, Princess Toshi, the daughter of Emperor Naruhito and Empress Masako, Kuroda lent Aiko the tiara that was presented to Kuroda for her own coming-of-age in 1989. Princess Aiko wore Kuroda’s tiara for the celebration of her coming-of-age on 5 December 2021.

== Titles and styles ==
Styles of Sayako, Princess Nori (before her marriage)
- Imperial Coat of Arms
- Reference style: Her Imperial Highness
- Spoken style: Your Imperial Highness

- 18 April 1969 – 15 November 2005: Her Imperial Highness Princess Nori
- 15 November 2005 – present: Mrs. Yoshiki Kuroda
