= Takamado-no-miya =

Branch of Japanese Imperial family

Takamado-no-miya 高円宮家
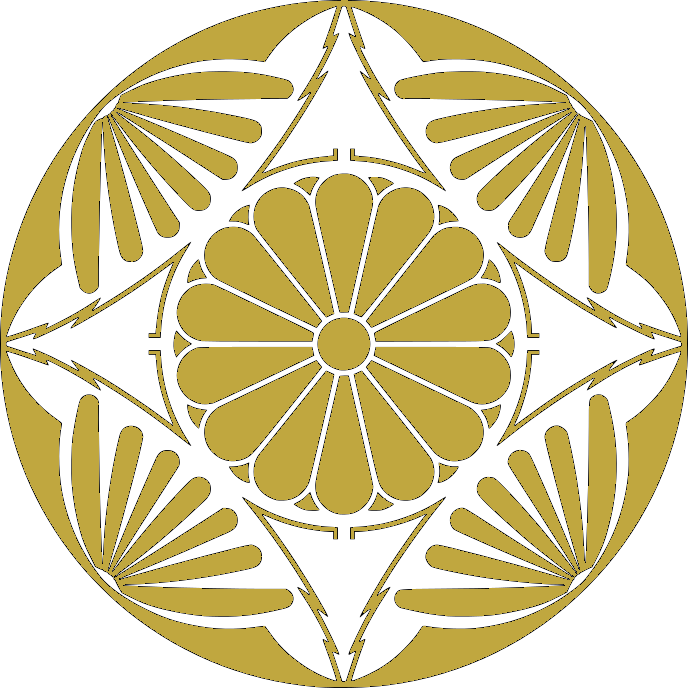
- Chrysanthemum crest of the Takamado family
- Home province: Tokyo
- Parent house: Mikasa-no-miya
- Titles: Prince Takamado
- Founder: Norihito, Prince Takamado
- Current head: Hisako, Princess Takamado
- Founding year: 1984

The Takamado-no-miya is a branch of the Japanese imperial family.

== Overview ==
The Takamado-no-miya was founded on December 6th, 1984, when Emperor Shōwa granted Prince Norihito, the third son of Prince Mikasa permission to start a new branch of the Imperial Family upon the occasion of his marriage to Hisako Tottori.

His title of Prince Takamado was derived from Mount Takamado in Nara, located near Mount Mikasa, the origin of his father's title. This was in accordance with the custom of princely titles coming from places associated with the Imperial Family.

=== Membership ===
| Name | Gender | Date of Birth | Age | Lineage | Notes |
|---|---|---|---|---|---|
| Norihito, Prince Takamado | Male | December 29, 1954 | | Third son of Takahito, Prince Mikasa | Died on 21 November 2002, at the age of 47. |
| Hisako, Princess Takamado | Female | July 10, 1953 | 72 | Eldest daughter of Shigejirō Tottori | |
| Princess Tsuguko of Takamado | Female | March 8, 1986 | 40 | Eldest daughter of Prince Norihito | |
| Noriko Senge | Female | July 22, 1988 | 37 | Second daughter of Prince Norihito | Left the Imperial Family upon marriage to Kunimaro Senge on May 27, 2014. |
| Ayako Moriya | Female | September 15, 1990 | 35 | Third daughter of Prince Norihito | Left the Imperial Family upon marriage to Kei Moriya on October 29, 2018. |

== Genealogy ==
123rd Emperor of Japan; Emperor Taishō
124th Emperor of Japan; Emperor Shōwa | Mikasa-no-miya; Prince Mikasa
〔Mikasa Household〕 | 1st Prince Takamado; Prince Norihito | Princess Hisako
Princess Tsuguko | Noriko Senge | Ayako Moriya
