= Uchima =

Uchima (written: 内間) is a Japanese surnames. Notable people with the surname include:

- Kohei Uchima (内間 康平, born 1988), Japanese cyclist
- Toshiko Uchima (内間俊子) (1918 - 2000), Japanese-American artist
- Yasumichi Uchima (内間 安路, born 1984), Japanese footballer
- Uchima Kanemaru, a royalist and founder of Uchima kingdom
