= Itsuko Nashimoto =

- Former Princess Nashimoto
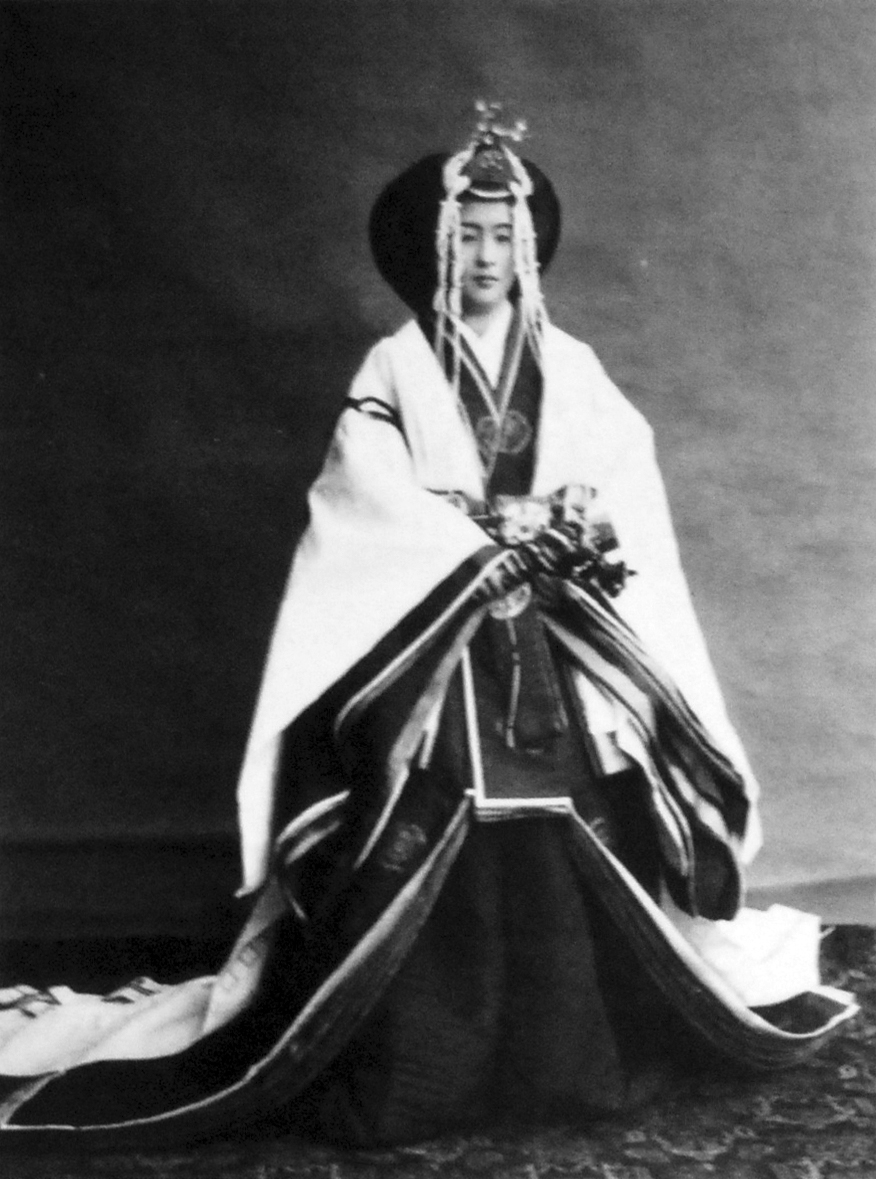
- Born: Itsuko Nabeshima; February 2, 1882; Rome, Italy
- Died: August 19, 1976 (aged 94); Tokyo, Japan
- Burial: Toshimaoka Cemetery, Bunkyo Ward, Tokyo, Japan
- Spouse: Prince Morimasa Nashimoto
- Issue: Yi Bangja; Noriko Hirohashi; Prince Norihiko (adopted)
- Father: Naohiro Nabeshima
- Mother: Nabeshima Nagako

Itsuko Nashimoto (梨本 伊都子, February 2, 1882 - August 19, 1976) was a former Japanese imperial family member. She was the wife of Prince Morimasa Nashimoto and the daughter of Marquis Naohiro Nabeshima and was an older sister of Nobuko Matsudaira. Before leaving the imperial family, she held the title of princess, and her honorific title under the Imperial Household Law was Her Imperial Highness (殿下, Denka). During her time as a royal, she was known as Princess Nashimoto.

She became involved in Japanese Red Cross activities and contributed to wartime nursing efforts. After leaving the imperial family in 1947, she lived as a private citizen until her death.

== Early life ==
Itsuko was born on February 2, 1882, in Rome, Italy, as the second daughter of Naohiro Nabeshima, who was serving as the Japanese Ambassador Plenipotentiary to Italy and her mother was Nagako Hirohashi, the fifth daughter of Taneyasu Hirohashi. Her name, Itsuko, was chosen to reflect "the child of the capital of Italy" (伊太利亜の都の子). At seven months old, her family returned to Japan, and she was raised at the Nabeshima residence in Nagatacho, Tokyo.

In September 1888, she enrolled in the Peeresses' School at the age of 7.

== Marital life ==
On October 13, 1896, Emperor Meiji approved her engagement to Prince Morimasa Nashimoto, and their formal betrothal ceremony took place on October 17.

On November 28, 1900, after she turned 18 years old, she fully married Prince Nashimoto, becoming Princess Itsuko Nashimoto.

Upon her marriage, she received a diamond and pearl bracelet from Empress Dowager Shoken and her father gifted her a tiara ordered from Paris, valued at over 20,000 yen at that time, along with a full set of jewelry, including necklaces, bracelets, brooches, and rings.

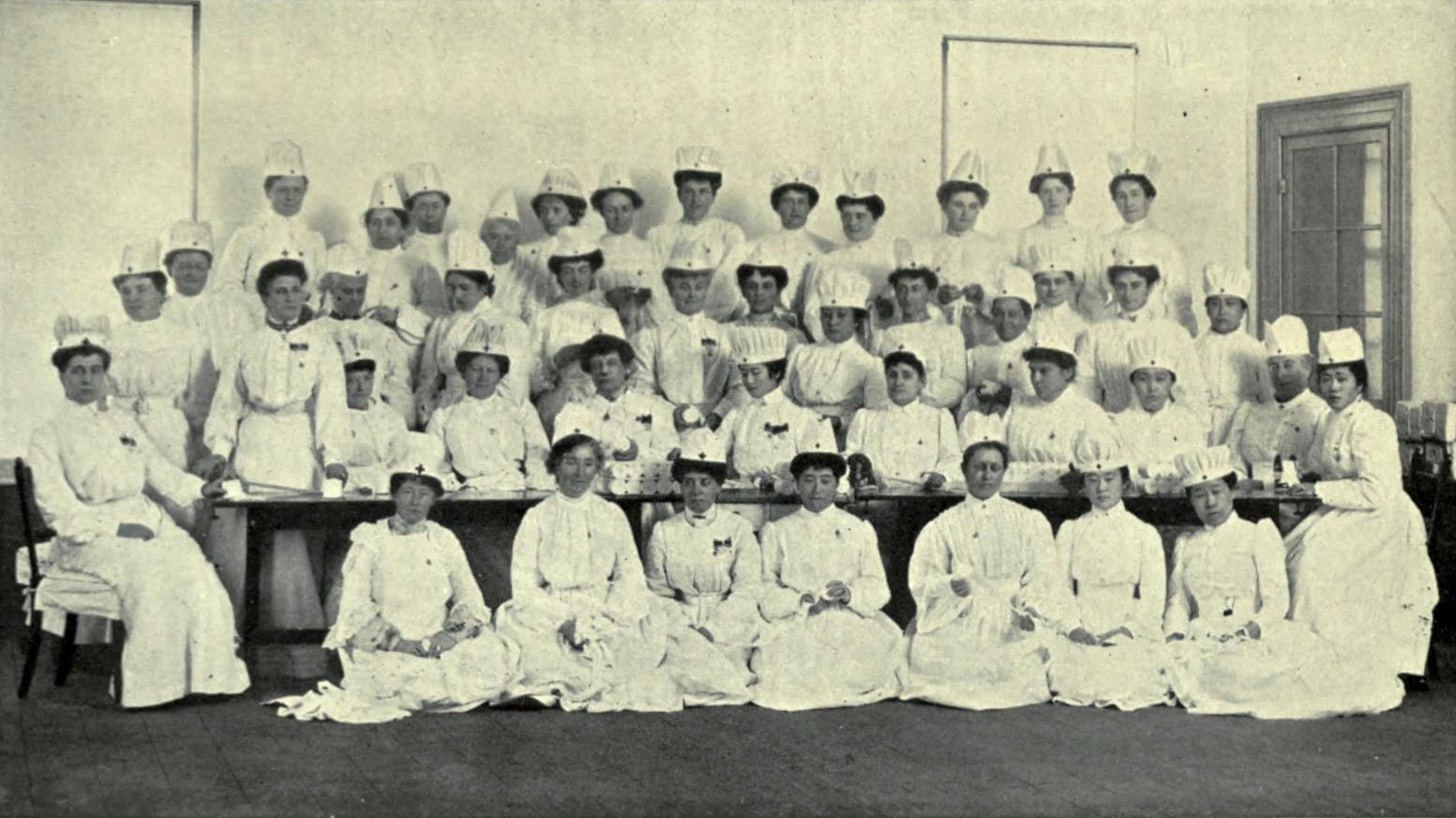
Princess nashimoto red cross hospital tokyo.jpg (description page)

Itsuko Nashimoto received medical training based on Western medicine from the Japanese Red Cross Society around 1902 and was awarded a nursing certificate on June 17, 1903. During the Russo-Japanese War (1904), she actively participated in volunteer nursing efforts, visiting and supporting wounded soldiers.

On January 13, 1909, she traveled to Europe under the title Countess Tada, accompanying Prince Morimasa Nashimoto, who had completed his studies in France, on a tour of European royal courts.

During World War II, she continued relief efforts, even traveling to Liaodong Peninsula. Initially, she welcomed Japan's victories and the rise of anti-American sentiment, describing it as a long-awaited awakening. However, by 1944, frequent air raid warnings led to sleepless nights, and on May 26, 1945, the Nashimoto residence in Shibuya was destroyed in a Tokyo air raid, worsening her living conditions.

On August 15, 1945, she knelt before the radio to listen to the Emperor's surrender broadcast, shedding tears over Japan's defeat. Her diary entry that day expressed relief that the national polity was preserved, but also contained strong resentment toward the United States and Britain. Even after the war, she continued charitable work, including supporting war orphans.

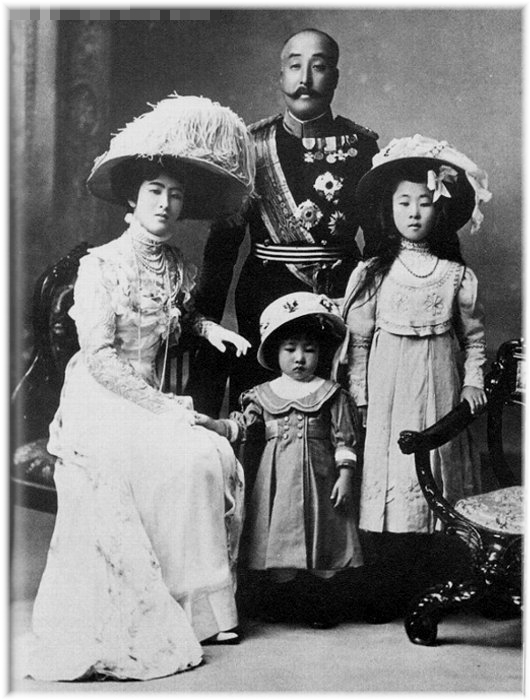
Nashimoto Family

On October 14, 1947, Itsuko Nashimoto left the imperial family under Article 11, Clause 1 of the Imperial House Law (Article 11, Clause 1 of the Imperial House Law states that a Naishinno (Imperial Princess), O (Prince), or Jo-o (Princess) who is 15 years or older may leave the Imperial Family if they wish to do so, with approval from the Imperial House Council). Following her departure, she officially adopted the name Itsuko Nashimoto (梨本 伊都子). Despite losing her royal status, she maintained her dignity as a former imperial family member and was often referred to as "the last noblewoman." However, she faced financial difficulties, having to sell her villa, personal belongings, and parts of her main residence to pay heavy property taxes.

On 2 January 1951, Itsuko's husband Prince Morimasa Nashimoto died of a heart attack.

The couple had two daughters :

1. Princess Nashimoto Masako (方子女王, 4 November 1899 – 30 April 1989): She married Yi Un (Crown Prince Euimin), the half-brother and heir of Korea's last monarch Sunjong of Korea and mothered two sons, Yi Jin and Yi Ku, respectively.
2. Princess Nashimoto Noriko (規子女王, 27 April 1907 – 25 August 1985): She married Count Hirohashi Tadamitsu.

== Later life ==
In 1958, she strongly opposed the "Mitchy Boom", a public frenzy surrounding the engagement of Crown Prince Akihito and Michiko Shoda, alongside her sister Nobuko Matsudaira, her niece Princess Chichibu, and Empress Kōjun. In her diary entry on November 27, 1958, she expressed anger and disappointment, writing that the engagement filled the day with frustration and lamenting that Japan was doomed.However, after Emperor Shōwa expressed his approval of the marriage, she refrained from further public criticism.

In her later years, she enjoyed kabuki performances and gatherings of the Tokiwakai, the alumna association of noblewomen who graduated from the middle school division of Gakushūin. She lived on the widow's pension of her late husband, Prince Morimasa, who had served as an army general.

On August 19, 1976, she died at the age of 94 due to complications following breast cancer surgery.
