= Japan–British Society =

The Japan–British Society
- Formation: 1908-11-27
- Headquarters: 2F Fuji Building, 3-2-3 Marunouchi, Chiyoda-ku, Tokyo 100-0005, Japan
- Members: 2000+ members, 120+ corporate members
- Official language: English, Japanese
- Honorary Patron: Prince Tomohito of Mikasa
- President: Ambassador Sir David Warren, KCMG
- Chairman: Yoshiji Nogami
- Website: www.japanbritishsociety.or.jp/english/

The Japan–British Society (or Nichiei Kyōkai (日英協会)) was founded in 1908 "to encourage the study of things British and to promote cordial relations between the peoples of Great Britain and Japan." It is the oldest bilateral organization in Japan, promoting international cooperation and exchanges.

== Foundation of the society ==
The society was founded in 1908, six years after Japan and the United Kingdom formed the Anglo-Japanese Alliance, which at first was a purely military arrangement. Japanese Government Officials established the society after recognising the need for mutual understanding of the two countries' societies and cultures.

The Japan–British Society and the Japan Society's Japan branch (which is no longer extant) appear to have had their roots in a group known as "the Old Country Club" for Japanese who had previously lived in England.

On 20 October 1908, a meeting was held at the Peer's Club (Note: The Peer's Club purchased the old Rokumeikan building in 1890, and renamed it Kazoku Kaikan (華族会館, literally "Peerage Meeting Hall", though known in English as the Peer's Club, Noble's Club, and Peerage Club.) The building was demolished in 1941, and its imposing, copper clad gates were destroyed by bombing in 1945.) in Tokyo to discuss the formation in Tokyo of a society to equal the Japan Society of London. Viscount Hayashi was elected as chairman, and the British Ambassador (Note: The Ambassador Extraordinary and Plenipotentiary from the Court of St. James's to Japan holds the presidency of the society for the duration of their appointment.) was elected as its first president. The Ambassador proposed that the society be named "The Japanese and British Society", however those present chose the shorter "The British Society" instead.

On 27 November 1908, "The British Society" held its inaugural meeting at the Imperial Hotel (Note: The original, wooden Imperial Hotel was built next to the Rokumeikan/Kazoku Kaikan in 1890, but was demolished and replaced by a stone and concrete structure designed by Frank Lloyd Wright in 1923, which in turn was demolished to make way for the current structure in 1968.) in Tokyo, and at some point after 1910, changed its name to "The Japan-British Society".

== 1908 to the present day ==
On 13 March 1935, Mr. Charles Sale of the Japan Society used the inauguration of a telephone service between Japan and the United Kingdom to send the Japan Society's greetings to the officers and council of the Japan–British Society in Tokyo, and to their patron Prince Chichibu.

During the Second World War, the society's activities were halted, and air raids destroyed much of their records. The society resumed its activities upon the conclusion of the Treaty of San Francisco in 1951.

Large-scale festivals of Japanese culture were held in the U.K. in 1981 and 1991. In 1998, a reciprocal event, the UK98 festival, was held with the cooperation of the association to introduce British culture to Japan.

The Society supported the Japan 2001 festival, which featured a series of events to introduce traditional and contemporary Japanese culture throughout Britain. The event's joint patrons were the Prince of Wales and the Crown Prince of Japan. In addition, the society began compiling a history of the organization in preparation for its centenary in 2008.

In November, 2000, the society was reformed and established as a Shadan Hojin (社団法人, incorporated association).

== Membership ==
This body has over 2000 members and is supported by more than 120 corporate members. Membership of the Society is open to anyone with an interest in the cause of Japan-United Kingdom relations, and on the recommendation of a member of the Society or upon attending a membership interview.

== Imperial patronage ==
Prince Fushimi Sadanaru became the first Royal Patron of the Society in 1910, after taking an active role in Anglo-Japanese relations. He travelled to the UK in May, 1907, to give Emperor Meiji's thanks to King Edward VII for bestowing The Most Noble Order of the Garter upon him. He was sent to England again after Russo-Japanese War in 1909, on a mission of thanks from the Japanese government for British advice and assistance during the war, and the Prince also represented Japan at the state funeral of King Edward VII on May 20, 1910, and met with the new King George V at Buckingham Palace.

Later, Prince and Princess Chichibu were Honorary Patrons. Prince Chichibu was the second son of Emperor Taishō and noted for his efforts to promote international relations. His promotion of rugby in Japan is remembered at the Chichibunomiya Rugby Stadium (Prince Chichibu Memorial Rugby Ground) in Aoyama. After his death, Princess Chichibu, eldest daughter of Ambassador Tsuneo Matsudaira, accepted the honorary patronage. She was active in Anglo-Japanese relations, visiting the UK in 1962 (in reciprocation for the first post-war visit by a member of the UK Royal family, Princess Alexandra of Kent, the previous year), and again in 1967, for the 75th anniversary of the Japan Society. Every year, the society holds the Princess Chichibu Memorial Lecture.

As of 2013 Prince Tomohito of Mikasa was the Honorary Patron of the Japan–British Society. He is the eldest son of Prince Mikasa, and an alumnus of Oxford University's Magdalen College.

== Events ==
The Society provides a forum within which members of both nationalities meet for social and cultural exchanges on an informal and friendly basis. The Society's regular events are an Annual Dinner, a Gala Party, the Princess Chichibu Memorial Lecture and the Annual Golf Tournament for the Princess Chichibu Trophy. The society also holds many other events such as wine or sake tasting, trips to sporting events and theatrical performances, cultural lessons (such as English cookery), Business Forum meetings, and lectures.

The society's Junior Group arranges social events to appeal to younger members, including the annual Christmas party, the Mochitsuki (rice pounding), Shinnenkai (New Year's party), pub nights, film viewings, barbecues, and cherry blossom viewing at the British Embassy.

== Activities ==
The society has supported a number of exchange programs and offers opportunities for British and Japanese members to become acquainted with each other, including seasonal events and lectures. In the educational sphere, the society has supported English language study programs in Britain.

Beginning in 2017, the society worked with the Japan Association of the UK to coordinate the Sakura Cherry Tree Project, a program designated to plant cherry blossoms in the United Kingdom as a show of friendship. The first trees were planted in 2019.

== Regional The Japan British Society ==
The Japan–British Society was founded in Tokyo in 1908 and gradually spread to many regional areas. As of August, 2009, there are 19 independent, regional Japan-British Societies outside Tokyo: Aichi, Aomori, Asahikawa, Ehime, Fukui, Fukuoka, Hakodate, Hiroshima, Hokkaido, Ishikawa, Iwate, Kagoshima, Kansai, Kumamoto, Miyazaki, Nagasaki, Shizuoka, Tohoku, Yamaguchi.

== Works ==
The society publishes monthly notices (including information about society events, related events, and book reviews) and an annual report.

== See also ==
- British Council
- Japan–British Exhibition
- The Japan Society of the UK

== External links and sources ==
- The Japan British Society's website
- Exterior and interior photographs of the Peer's Club in Tokyo, circa 1911.
- Exterior and interior photographs of the Imperial Hotel in Tokyo, circa 1911.
