= Nagako Nabeshima =

Nabeshima Nagako
- 鍋島榮子
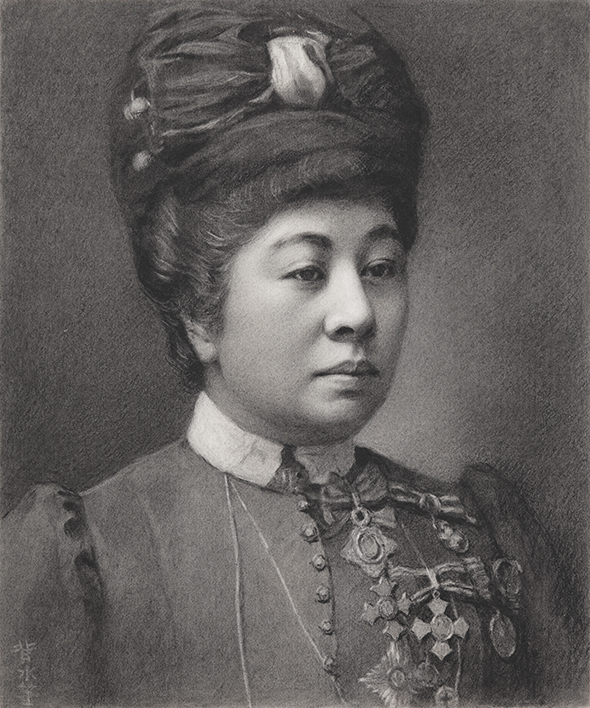
- Portrait of Nabeshima Nagako by Takagi Haisui (Nabeshima Hōkōkai)
- Born: 18 May 1855
- Died: 3 January 1941 (aged 85)
- Spouse(s): Minamiiwakura Tomoyoshi; Nabeshima Naohiro
- Children: Itsuko Nashimoto; Nabeshima Nobuko
- Father: Hirohashi Taneyasu

Nagako Nabeshima (鍋島榮子; 18 May 1855 – 3 January 1941) was a feature of Japanese high society from the Meiji period to the early Shōwa era. Daughter of kuge Hirohashi Taneyasu, in April 1881 she married Nabeshima Naohiro, eleventh and final daimyō of the Saga Domain, in Italy, where he was performing official duties. Nagako served as secretary and chair of the Volunteer Nurses Association (篤志看護婦人会) of the Japanese Red Cross Society from 1887 to 1936 as well as president of the Oriental Women's Association (東洋婦人会).

== See also ==
- Seiyōkan (Nabeshima residence)
- Chōkokan
