= Nabeshima Naotora =

Japanese politician

Junior Second Rank Viscount Nabeshima Naotora
- 鍋島 直虎
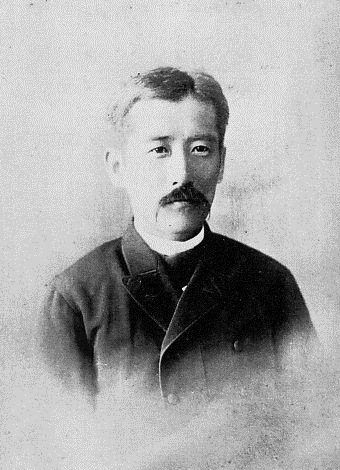

Member of the House of Peers
- In office 10 July 1890 – 9 July 1925 Elected by the Viscounts

Governor of Ogi Domain
- In office June 1869 – 14 July 1871
- Monarch: Meiji
- Preceded by: Himself (as Daimyō of Ogi)
- Succeeded by: Position abolished

Daimyō of Ogi Domain
- In office 21 March 1864 – June 1869
- Shōgun: Tokugawa Iemochi; Tokugawa Yoshinobu
- Preceded by: Nabeshima Naosuke
- Succeeded by: Himself (as Governor of Ogi)

Personal details
- Born: 15 March 1856
- Died: 30 October 1925 (aged 69)
- Parent: Nabeshima Naomasa (father)

Viscount Nabeshima Naotora (鍋島 直虎; 15 March 1856 – 30 October 1925) was the 11th and final daimyō of Ogi Domain in Hizen Province, Kyūshū, Japan. Before the Meiji Restoration, his courtesy title was Kii-no-Kami and junior 5th, lower grade court rank (ju go i no ge, 従五位下).

== Biography ==
Naotora was born as the 7th son of Nabeshima Naomasa, the daimyō of Saga Domain. As the 10th daimyō of Ogi, Nabeshima Naosuke had no son, he adopted Naotora, who married his only daughter Haruko. Naotora became daimyō on the death of his father-in-law in 1864.

The Boshin War of the Meiji Restoration began only four years later, and he was called upon to lead Ogi’s forces against the Tokugawa remnants at Akita in northern Japan. For his loyalty to the new government and efforts in the war, the revenues of Ogi domain were raised by 5,000 koku in August 1869. However, this reward was only nominal, as with the abolition of the han system, the title of daimyo had been abolished and Naotora became "domain governor". This title was abolished as well in 1871, when Ogi domain became part of the new Saga Prefecture.

Naotora departed Japan with his elder brother Nabeshima Naohiro in 1873 for studies in Great Britain, returning to Japan only in 1882. During his stay in England, many of his former retainers perished in the Saga Rebellion and he found himself in disfavor with the new Meiji government. However, through the efforts of his brother Naohiro after his return to Japan, he was awarded the peerage title of viscount (shishaku) under the kazoku system.

He later served as an advisor to the Foreign Ministry and as a member of the House of Peers in the Diet of Japan. In 1922, he was granted the courtesy title of junior second rank (ju ni-i, 従二位).

Preceded by Nabeshima Naosuke	11th Daimyō of Ogi; 1864-1871	Succeeded by None (domain abolished)
