= Chichibunomiya =

Chichibunomiya may refer to:

- Chichibunomiya Rugby Stadium
- Prince Chichibu
