= Yi Bangja =

Japanese-Korean princess (1901–1989)

- Crown Princess of Korea
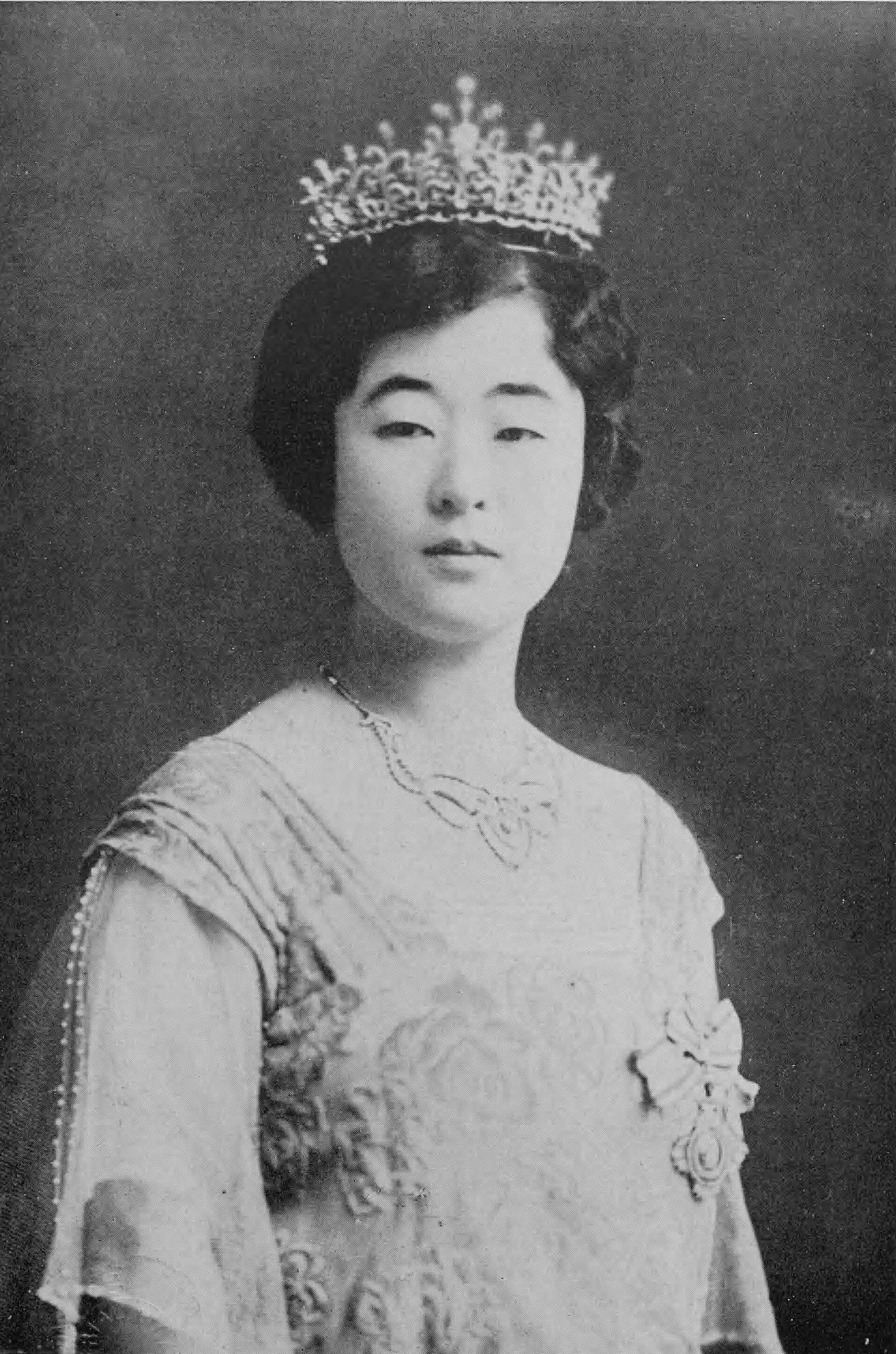
- Then-Princess Masako wearing the Order of the Precious Crown, between 1919/1926
- Born: Princess Masako of Nashimoto; 4 November 1901; Tokyo, Japan
- Died: 30 April 1989 (aged 87); Nakseon Hall, Changdeok Palace, Seoul, South Korea
- Spouse: Crown Prince Euimin (m. 1920; died 1970)
- Issue: Yi Jin; Yi Gu
- House: Yi (by marriage)
- Father: Morimasa, Prince Nashimoto
- Mother: Nabeshima Itsuko

Japanese name
- Kanji: 方子女王
Transcriptions
- Romanization: Masako Joō

Korean name
- Hangul: 이방자
- Hanja: 李方子
Transcriptions
- Revised Romanization: I Bangja
- McCune–Reischauer: I Pangja

Yi Bangja (Korean: 이방자; 4 November 1901 – 30 April 1989) was the wife of Crown Prince Euimin, the last Crown Prince of the Korean Empire. She was born as Princess Masako of Nashimoto (方子女王, Masako Joō), a member of the Japanese Imperial Family.

== Birth ==
Born Princess Masako of Nashimoto (Japanese: 方子女王), she was the first daughter of Japanese imperial family member Prince Nashimoto Morimasa, the seventh son of Prince Kuni Asahiko and his wife, Princess Itsuko, a daughter of Marquis Naohiro Nabeshima. She was a first cousin of Empress Kōjun of Japan. On the maternal side, she was also a first cousin of Princess Setsuko.

== Marriage ==
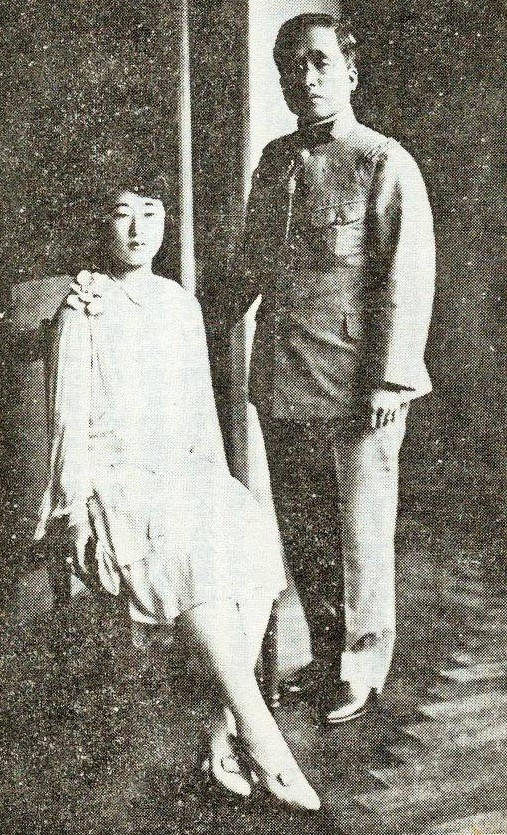
Wedding photo

Princess Masako was a leading candidate to wed the crown prince of Japan, the future Emperor Hirohito. Other candidates included Princess Nagako of Kuni (who became the future Empress Kōjun), and Tokiko Ichijō, the daughter of Prince Saneteru Ichijō who was later eventually to marry Prince Fushimi Hiroyoshi. The possibility of infertility and the feeble political influence of her family were among the reasons she was removed from the list of candidates. However, Princess Masako was selected instead to wed Crown Prince Euimin of Korea who had been held by Japanese government under the pretense of studying abroad in 1917. The wedding was held on 28 April 1920, at the Korean royal residence in Tokyo. Princess Masako was still a student at the Girls' Department of the Gakushūin Peers' School at the time; her new title became Her Royal Highness Crown Princess of King Yi (Japanese: 李王世子妃). In addition, the title she received from birth, Princess Masako, still retained after she married. Despite an unfavorable fertility diagnosis prior to her marriage, she gave birth to a son, Yi Jin, on 18 August 1921. However, Prince Jin died under suspicious circumstances when she visited Korea with her husband on 11 May 1922.

On 24 April 1926, Princess Masako received the formal title Her Royal Highness Princess Masako, Queen Yi (Japanese: 李王妃方子女王) when the Emperor Sunjong, the elder brother of Crown Prince Euimin, died. Under the terms of the Japan–Korea Annexation Treaty, the Korean royal title was demoted from that of "Emperor" to "King" and Crown Prince Euimin was never formally crowned as the monarch of Korea; therefore, Princess Masako would later be addressed as "Bangja, Crown Princess Euimin" in Korea. On 29 December 1931, she gave birth to a second son, Yi Ku.

== Life as last Crown Princess of Korea ==
After the end of World War II, all former royal and peerage titles were abolished by the American occupation authorities, after which, Princess Masako took the Korean name Yi Bangja. Republic of Korea President Rhee Syng-man's fear of Crown Prince Euimin's potential to be a political opponent, along with Euimin's collaboration with Japan prevented the family's homecoming, and they lived in destitution as Korean residents in Japan. In November 1963, Yi Bangja and her family came back to Korea at the invitation of President Park Chung Hee and were allowed to live in Changdeok Palace in downtown Seoul. However, by this time, Crown Prince Euimin was already unconscious from cerebral thrombosis and was rushed to Seoul Sungmo Hospital where he remained bedridden for the rest of his life.

Thereafter, Yi Bangja devoted herself to the education of mentally and physically disabled people. She successively became the chairman of various committees including the Commemorative Committee of Crown Prince Euimin, and the Myeonghwi-won, an asylum for deaf-and-dumb persons or patients suffering from infantile paralysis and she founded the Jahye School and the Myeonghye School, which helps disabled people become socially adapted. She was adored as the "mother of the handicapped in Korea" and despite lingering anti-Japanese sentiment in Korea she was a widely respected Japanese woman in Korea.

Some members of the Nashimoto family, her relatives, visited Seoul in October 2008 to pay their respects. The Nashimotos have continued supporting her charity foundations for helping physically challenged Korean people even after the Princess died in 1989.

== Death ==
Yi Bangja died from cancer on 30 April 1989, at the age of 87, at Nakseon Hall within Changdeok Palace in Seoul.

Her funeral was conducted as a semi-state funeral, attended by Prince Mikasa and Princess Mikasa of Japan as representatives of the Japanese imperial family. She was buried alongside her husband, Crown Prince Euimin, at the Hongyureung tomb complex in Namyangju, near Seoul.

== Children ==
1. Prince Yi Jin (이진; 李晋; I Jin; 18 August 1921 – 11 May 1922). He was poisoned during a visit to Korea with his parents. His funeral was held on 17 May 1922 and he was buried in Korea.
2. Prince Yi Ku (이구; 李玖; I Gu; 29 December 1931 – 16 July 2005). Prince Gu became the 29th Head of the House of Yi upon the death of his father.

== Ancestry ==
Ancestors of Yi Bangja

16. Sadayoshi, Prince Fushimi
8. Kuniye, Prince Fushimi
4. Asahiko, Prince Kuni
9. Torikoji Nobuko, concubine
2. Morimasa, Prince Nashimoto
5. Harada Mitsue, concubine
1. Princess Masako of Nashimoto
24. Nabeshima Narinao, 9th Daimyō of Saga
12. Nabeshima Naomasa, 10th Daimyō of Saga
25. daughter of Ikeda Harumichi, 6th Daimyō of Tottori
6. Marquis Nabeshima Naohiro
3. Lady Nabeshima Itsuko
28. Jundaijin Hirohashi Mitsunari
14. Dainagon Count Hirohashi Taneho
29. daughter of Asukai Masayuki
7. Lady Hirohashi Nagako

== Popular culture ==
Yi Bangja was portrayed by Naho Toda in the 2016 film The Last Princess.

== See also ==
- Rulers of Korea
- Korea under Japanese rule

Yi Bangja Nashimoto-no-miya Born: 4 November 1899 Died: 30 April 1989
Titles in pretence
| Preceded by Empress Sunjeonghyo | — TITULAR — Empress consort of Korea; 24 April 1926 – 1 May 1970; Reason for succession failure: Empire abolished by Japanese annexation 1910 | Succeeded by Julia Mullock |
