= Statue of Yasuhito, Prince Chichibu =

Sculpture in Tokyo, Japan

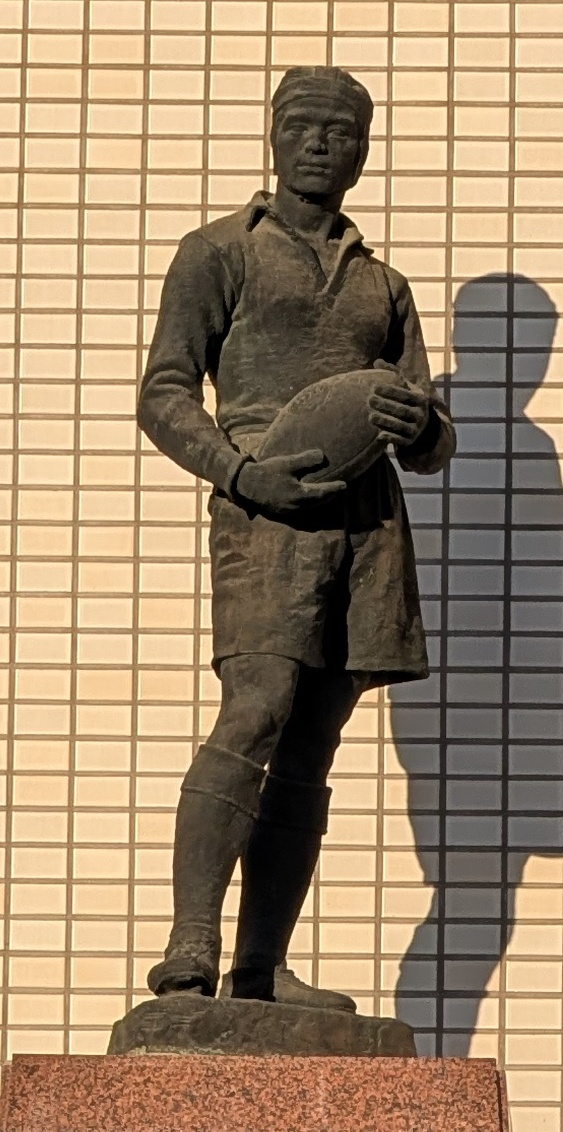
- The statue in 2025
- Subject: Yasuhito, Prince Chichibu
- Location: Tokyo, Japan; 35°40′20.7″N 139°43′3.3″E

A statue of Yasuhito, Prince Chichibu wearing a rugby uniform is installed outside Chichibunomiya Rugby Stadium, in Tokyo, Japan.
