= Sakura Cherry Tree Project =

Tree planting project in the UK

The Sakura Cherry Tree Project is a tree planting program in the United Kingdom. It is intended to symbolise friendship between the United Kingdom and Japan.

The trees were donated by the private sector in Japan and are of three types: Beni-yutaka, Tai-haku, and Somei-yoshino.

== History ==
The project was started following the meeting of the Japanese and British prime ministers, Shinzo Abe and Theresa May respectively, in 2017. It was coordinated by the Japan–British Society and the Japan Association of the UK. The Japanese arm of the Japan–British Society organised funding for the project, while the British arm of the Japan Association of the UK selected sites for planting and procured the trees.

On 27 November 2019, the first trees were planted at Regent's Park in London. By 2021, there were 160 Sakura-planting sites in the UK, and 400 schools participating to the plantation project.
