= Yasuhito, Prince Chichibu =

Japanese prince (1902–1953)

Yasuhito
- Prince Chichibu
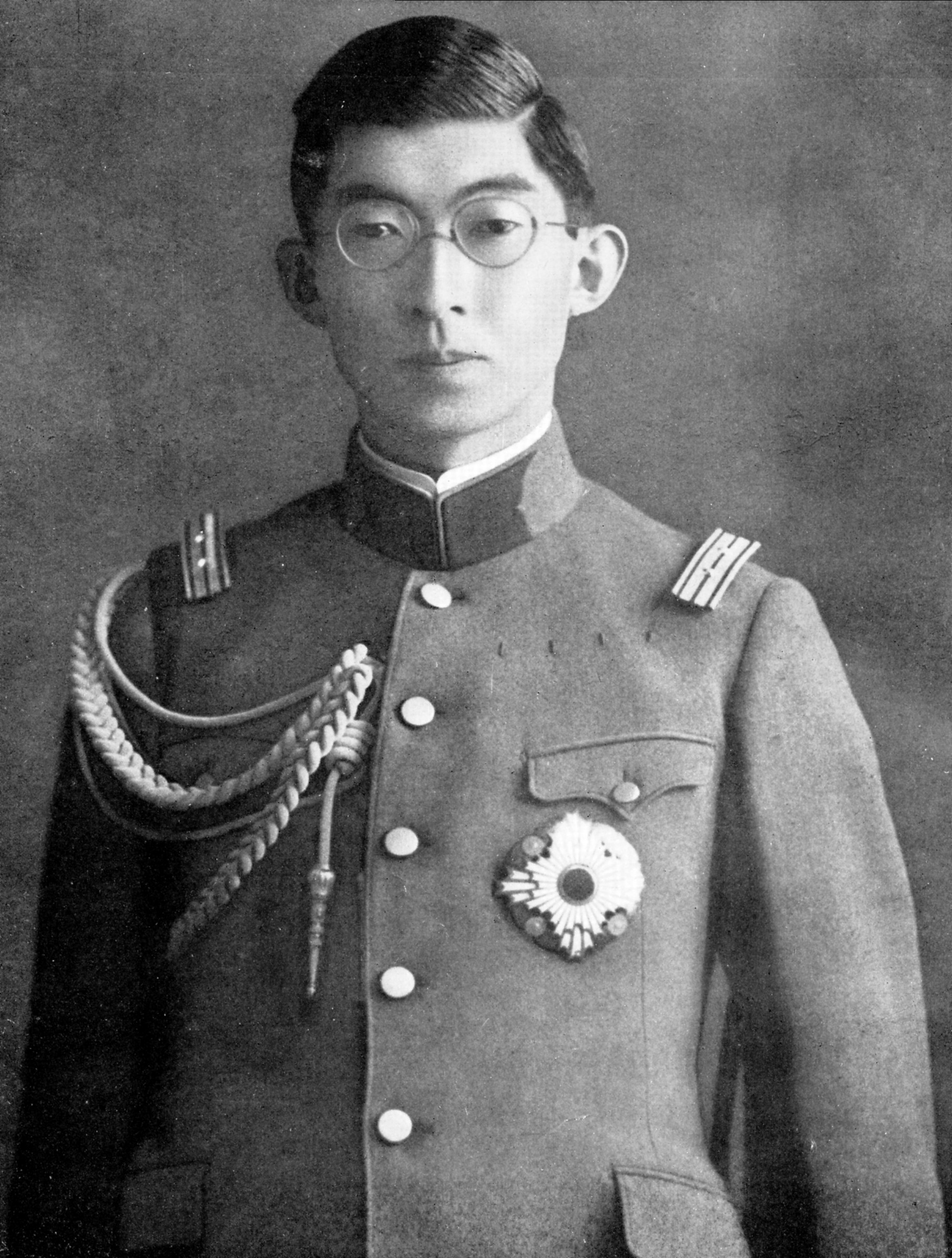
- Yasuhito, c. 1938–39
- Born: Yasuhito, Prince Atsu (淳宮雍仁親王); 25 June 1902; Aoyama Detached Palace, Tokyo City, Japan
- Died: 4 January 1953 (aged 50); Kugenuma Villa, Fujisawa, Kanagawa, Japan
- Burial: 12 January 1953; Toshimagaoka Imperial Cemetery, Bunkyō, Tokyo
- Spouse: Setsuko Matsudaira (m. 1928)
- House: Imperial House of Japan
- Father: Emperor Taishō
- Mother: Sadako Kujō
- Occupation: General in the Imperial Japanese Army (see military career)
- Military career
- Allegiance: Japan
- Branch: Imperial Japanese Army
- Service years: 1922–1945
- Rank: Major-General
- Commands: 31st Infantry
- Conflicts: Second Sino-Japanese War; World War II

Yasuhito, Prince Chichibu (秩父宮雍仁親王, Chichibu-no-miya Yasuhito Shinnō; 25 June 1902 – 4 January 1953) was the second son of Emperor Taishō (Yoshihito) and Empress Teimei (Sadako), a younger brother of Emperor Shōwa (Hirohito) and a general in the Imperial Japanese Army. As a member of the Imperial House of Japan, he was the patron of several sporting, medical, and international exchange organizations. Before and after World War II, the English-speaking prince and his wife attempted to foster good relations between Japan and the United Kingdom and enjoyed a good rapport with the British royal family. As with other Japanese imperial princes of his generation, he was an active-duty career officer in the Imperial Japanese Army. Like all members of the imperial family, he was given immunity from criminal prosecution before the International Military Tribunal for the Far East by Douglas MacArthur.

== Background and family ==
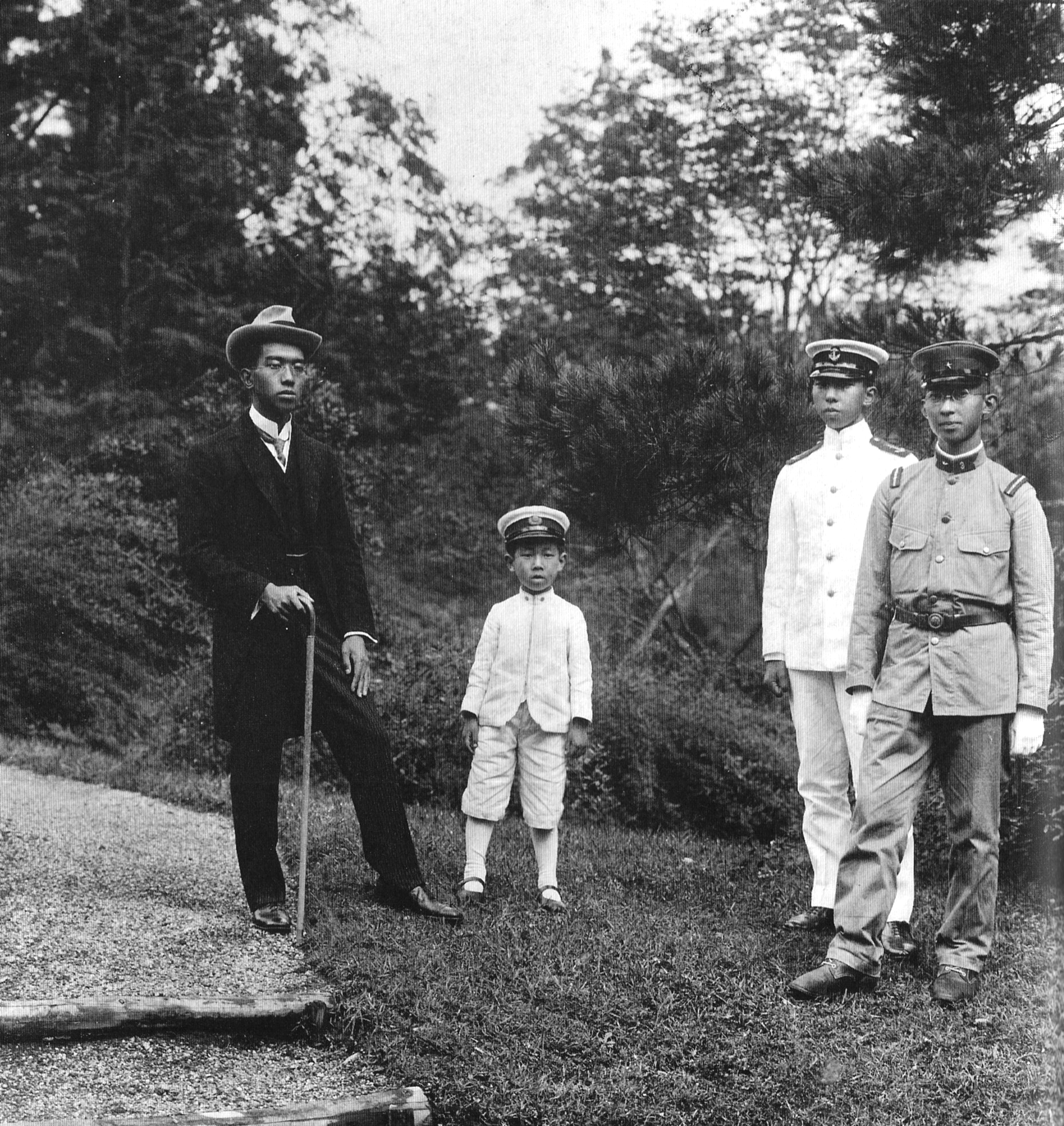
Emperor Taishō's four sons in 1921: Hirohito, Takahito, Nobuhito and Yasuhito

Born at Aoyama Detached Palace in Tokyo, the second son of Crown Prince Yoshihito (later Emperor Taishō) and Crown Princess Sadako (later Empress Teimei), the prince was originally titled Atsu no miya (Prince Atsu). He and his elder brother were separated from their parents and entrusted to the care of a respected ex-naval officer, Count Kawamura Sumiyoshi and his wife. After Kawamura died in 1904, the young princes rejoined their parents at the Tōgū-gosho (Crown Prince's residence) on the grounds of the Akasaka estate. He attended the elementary and secondary departments of the Gakushuin Peers' School along with Crown Prince Hirohito, and his younger brother, Prince Nobuhito (born in 1905) (a fourth brother, Prince Takahito, was born in 1915). Prince Chichibu enrolled in the Central Military Preparatory School in 1917 and then in the Imperial Japanese Army Academy in 1922.

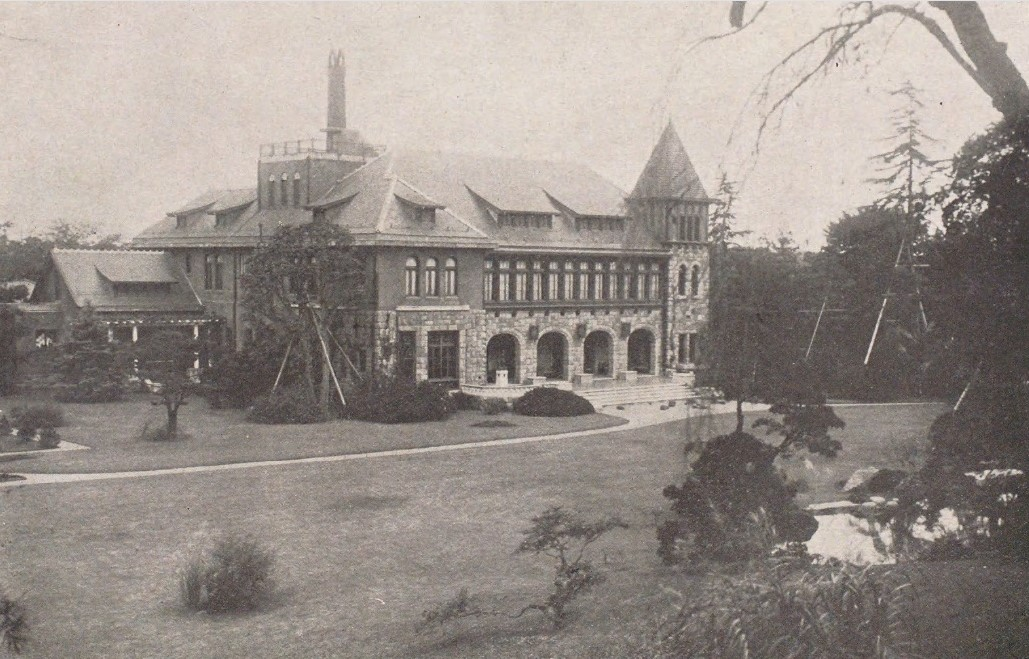
Prince Chichibu's residence in the Akasaka Imperial Estate

On 26 May 1922, Emperor Taishō granted his second son the title Chichibu no miya and the authorization to start a new branch of the imperial family. In 1925, the Prince went to Great Britain to study at Magdalen College, Oxford. While in Great Britain King George V decorated Prince Chichibu with the Grand Cross of the Royal Victorian Order. Prince Chichibu had a reputation as an outdoorsman and alpinist during his stay in Europe (he was elected to Honorary membership of the Alpine Club in 1928 (struck off in the second world war, but reinstated in 1952). He returned to Japan in January 1927 following the death of Emperor Taishō, who for some time had suffered from debilitating physical and mental ill-health. Until the birth of his nephew, Crown Prince Akihito in December 1933, Prince Chichibu was heir presumptive to the Chrysanthemum Throne.

== Marriage ==
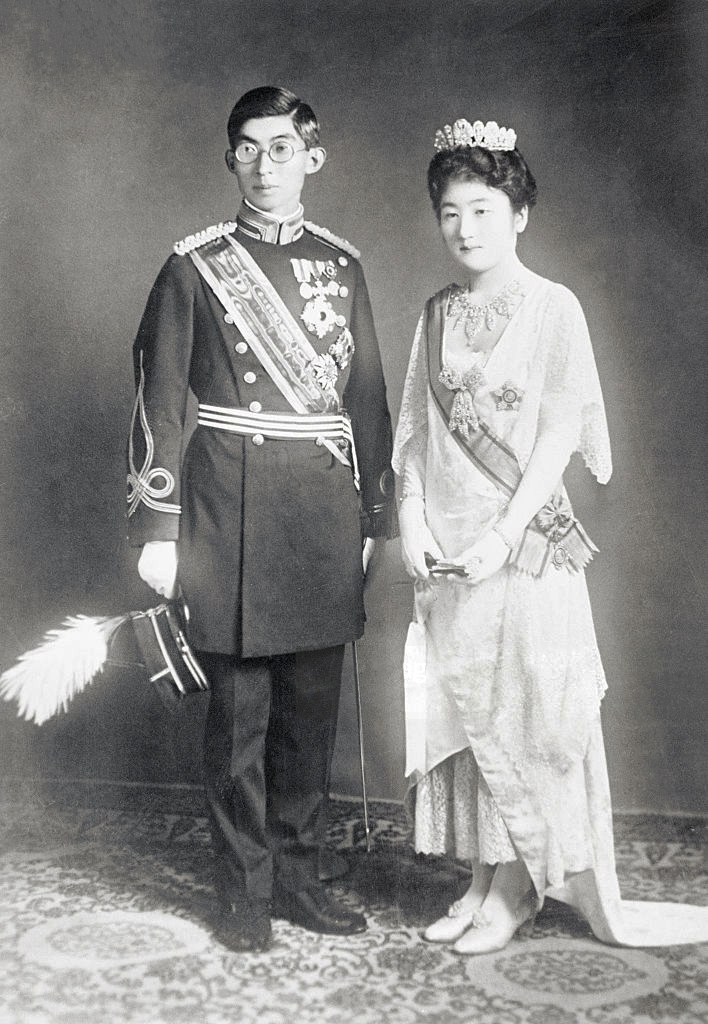
The Prince and Princess Chichibu on their wedding day

On 28 September 1928, the prince married Setsuko Matsudaira (1909–1995), the daughter of Tsuneo Matsudaira, Japanese ambassador to the United States and later Great Britain (and later, Imperial Household Minister), and his wife, the former Nobuko Nabeshima. Although technically born a commoner, the new princess was a scion of the Matsudaira of Aizu, a cadet branch of the Tokugawa shogunate. Her paternal grandfather was Matsudaira Katamori, the last daimyō of Aizu, whose heir had been created a viscount in the new kazoku system in 1884. Yasuhito and Setsuko were eighth cousins, thrice removed, as both were descended from Nabeshima Katsushige, the first lord of Saga. Prince and Princess Chichibu had no children, as Princess Chichibu's only pregnancy ended in a miscarriage. However, by all accounts their marriage was filled with love and happiness for each other.

== Military career ==
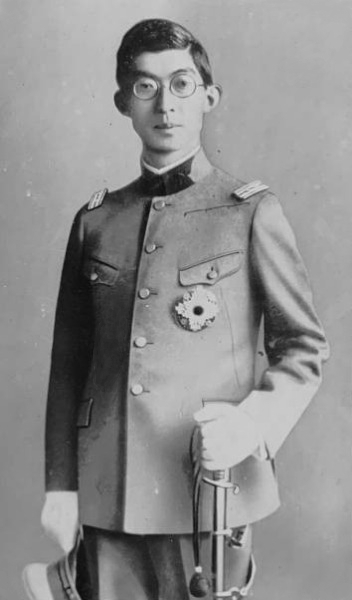
Prince Chichibu in 1934

Prince Chichibu received his commission as a second lieutenant in the infantry in October 1922 and was assigned to the First Imperial Guard Division. He was promoted to first lieutenant in 1925 and became a captain in 1930 after graduation from the Army War College. He received a promotion to the rank of major and assigned to command the Thirty First Infantry Division stationed at Hirosaki, Aomori in August 1935. Prince Chichibu was a vehement ultra-right-wing militarist who increasingly influenced Japanese military policy in the prewar era.

Prince Chichibu has been implicated by some historians in the abortive 26 February Incident in 1936. How much of a role he actually played in that event remains unclear, but it was clear that he was sympathetic to the rebels and that his political sentiments were in agreement with theirs, i.e., replacement of the corrupt political party based government with a military dictatorship under direct control of the emperor. His sympathy to the Kodoha faction within the Imperial Japanese Army was well known at the time. After the assassination of prime minister Inukai Tsuyoshi in 1932, he had many violent arguments with his brother, Emperor Hirohito, about the suspension of the constitution and the implementation of direct imperial rule.

After the coup attempt, the prince and his wife were sent on a tour of Western Europe taking several months. They represented Japan at the May 1937 coronation of King George VI and Queen Elizabeth of the United Kingdom in Westminster Abbey and subsequently visited Sweden and the Netherlands as the guests of King Gustaf V and Queen Wilhelmina, respectively. This tour ended with the visit of Nuremberg in Germany by the prince alone. There he attended the Nuremberg rally and met Adolf Hitler, with whom he tried to boost relations. At Nuremberg Castle, Hitler launched a scathing attack against Joseph Stalin, after which the prince privately said to his aide-de-camp Masaharu Homma: "Hitler is an actor, it will be difficult to trust him". Nevertheless, he remained convinced that the future of Japan was linked to Nazi Germany and in 1938 and 1939, he had many quarrels with the Emperor about the opportunity to join a military alliance with Germany against Great Britain and the United States.

Prince Chichibu was subsequently appointed battalion commander of Thirty-First Infantry Regiment in August 1937, promoted to lieutenant colonel in March 1938 and to colonel in August 1939. During the war, he was involved in combat operations, and was sent to Manchukuo before the Nomonhan incident and to Nanjing after the Nanjing Massacre. On 9 February 1939, Chichibu attended a lecture on bacteriological warfare, given by Shirō Ishii, in the War Ministry Grand Conference Hall in Tokyo. He also attended vivisection demonstrations by Ishii.

According to a version told in her memoirs by Princess Chichibu, according to which the prince retired from active duty after being diagnosed with pulmonary tuberculosis in June 1940, spent most of World War II convalescing at his villa in Gotemba, Shizuoka Prefecture, on the eastern foot of Mount Fuji and never really recovering from his illness. He was promoted to major general in March 1945.

== Patronage ==
After World War II, Prince Chichibu was honorary head of many athletic organizations, and was nicknamed the "sporting Prince" due to his efforts to promote skiing, rugby and other sports. He was also honorary President of both the Japan–British Society and the Swedish Society of Japan. He was a supporter of Scouting in Japan and attended the Fourth International Conference in 1926.

== Rugby union ==
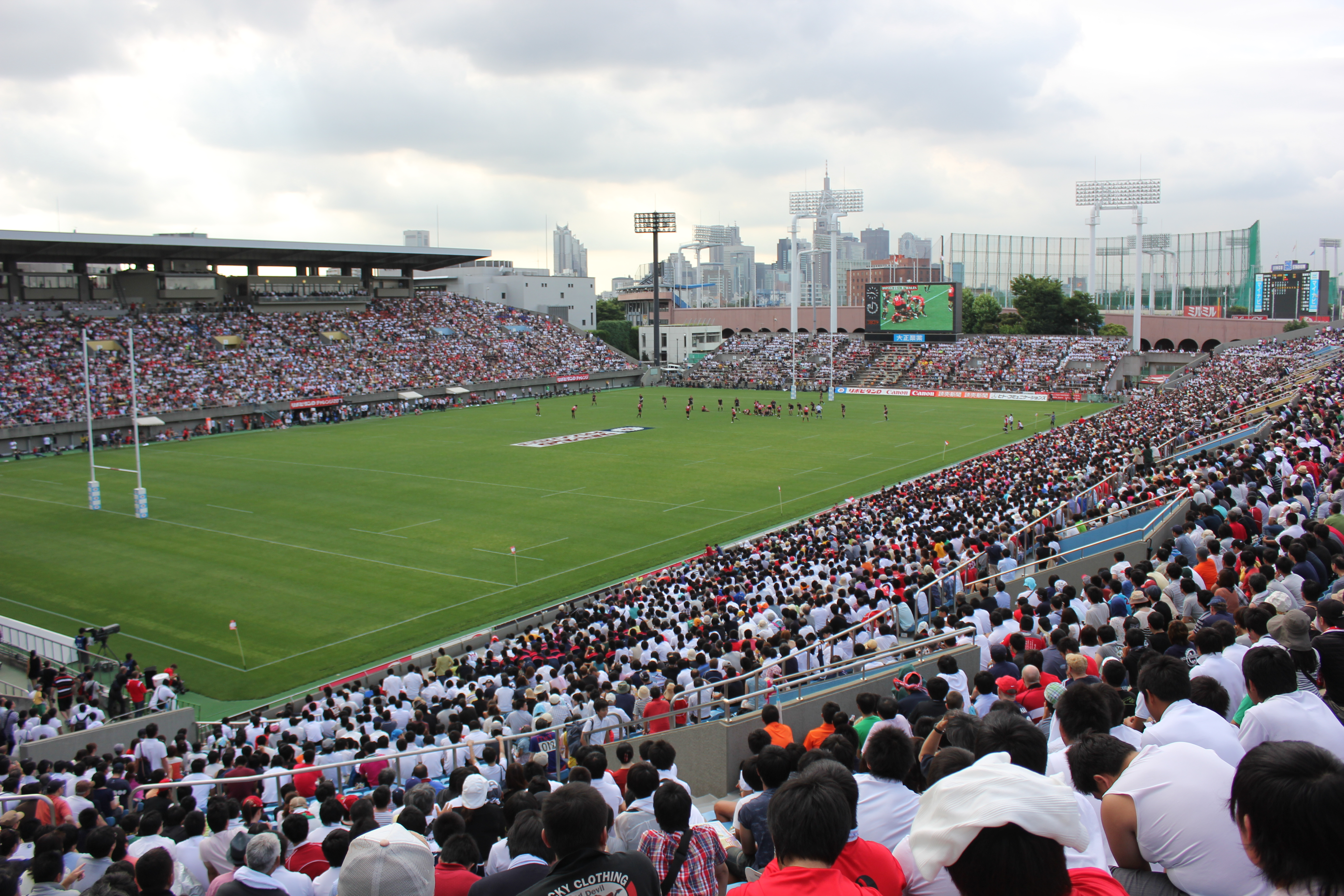
Chichibunomiya Rugby Stadium, which is named after the Prince

The prince was also instrumental in securing the development of rugby union in Japan. He was "converted" to rugby after the JRFU president, Shigeru Kayama, returned from a long sea voyage and was able to "market" the game to Prince Chichibu.

After his death, the Tokyo Rugby Stadium in Kita-Aoyama 2-chome was renamed Chichibunomiya Rugby Stadium. A statue of Prince Chichibu in rugby kit was erected there.

== Death ==
Prince Chichibu died from tuberculosis at his Kugenuma villa in Fujisawa, Kanagawa on 4 January 1953. His remains were cremated and the ashes buried at Toshimagaoka Cemetery (豊島岡墓地), Bunkyō, Tokyo, on 12 January 1953.

== Ancestry ==
Ancestors of Yasuhito, Prince Chichibu

8. Osahito, Emperor Kōmei
4. Mutsuhito, Emperor Meiji
9. Lady Yoshiko Nakayama
2. Yoshihito, Emperor Taishō
10. Count Takamitsu Yanagihara
5. Lady Naruko Yanagiwara
11. Lady Utano Hasegawa
1. Yasuhito, Prince Chichibu
12. Prince Kujō Hisatada, Regent
6. Prince Kujō Michitaka of the Fujiwara Clan
13. Lady Karahashi Meiko
3. Lady Sadako Kujō
14. Noma Yorioki
7. Lady Noma Ikuko
15. Lady Yamokushi Kairi

=== Patrilineal descent ===
Patrilineal descent

Imperial House of Japan

1. Descent prior to Keitai is unclear to modern historians, but traditionally traced back patrilineally to Emperor Jimmu
2. Emperor Keitai, ca. 450–534
3. Emperor Kinmei, 509–571
4. Emperor Bidatsu, 538–585
5. Prince Oshisaka, ca. 556–???
6. Emperor Jomei, 593–641
7. Emperor Tenji, 626–671
8. Prince Shiki, ???–716
9. Emperor Kōnin, 709–786
10. Emperor Kanmu, 737–806
11. Emperor Saga, 786–842
12. Emperor Ninmyō, 810–850
13. Emperor Kōkō, 830–867
14. Emperor Uda, 867–931
15. Emperor Daigo, 885–930
16. Emperor Murakami, 926–967
17. Emperor En'yū, 959–991
18. Emperor Ichijō, 980–1011
19. Emperor Go-Suzaku, 1009–1045
20. Emperor Go-Sanjō, 1034–1073
21. Emperor Shirakawa, 1053–1129
22. Emperor Horikawa, 1079–1107
23. Emperor Toba, 1103–1156
24. Emperor Go-Shirakawa, 1127–1192
25. Emperor Takakura, 1161–1181
26. Emperor Go-Toba, 1180–1239
27. Emperor Tsuchimikado, 1196–1231
28. Emperor Go-Saga, 1220–1272
29. Emperor Go-Fukakusa, 1243–1304
30. Emperor Fushimi, 1265–1317
31. Emperor Go-Fushimi, 1288–1336
32. Emperor Kōgon, 1313–1364
33. Emperor Sukō, 1334–1398
34. Prince Yoshihito Fushimi, 1351–1416
35. Prince Sadafusa Fushimi, 1372–1456
36. Emperor Go-Hanazono, 1419–1471
37. Emperor Go-Tsuchimikado, 1442–1500
38. Emperor Go-Kashiwabara, 1464–1526
39. Emperor Go-Nara, 1495–1557
40. Emperor Ōgimachi, 1517–1593
41. Prince Masahito, 1552–1586
42. Emperor Go-Yōzei, 1572–1617
43. Emperor Go-Mizunoo, 1596–1680
44. Emperor Reigen, 1654–1732
45. Emperor Higashiyama, 1675–1710
46. Prince Naohito Kanin, 1704–1753
47. Prince Sukehito Kanin, 1733–1794
48. Emperor Kōkaku, 1771–1840
49. Emperor Ninkō, 1800–1846
50. Emperor Kōmei, 1831–1867
51. Emperor Meiji, 1852–1912
52. Emperor Taishō, 1879–1926
53. Yasuhito, Prince Chichibu

== Gallery ==
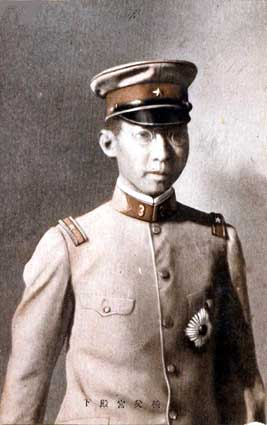
Prince Chichibu in his twenties, as a second lieutenant

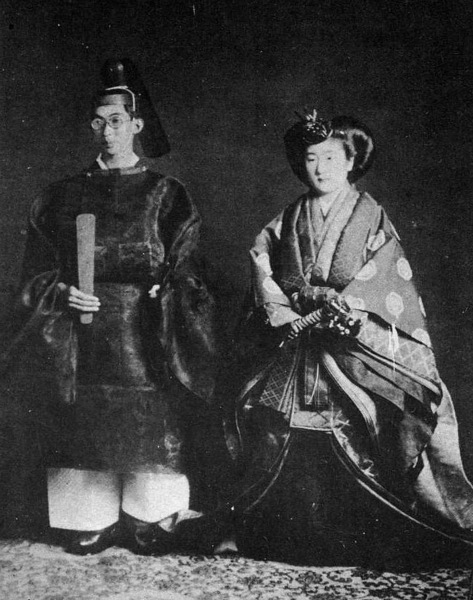
Prince and Princess Chichibu wedding

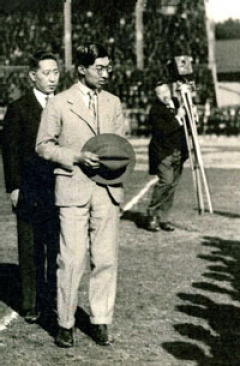
Prince Chichibu in stadium

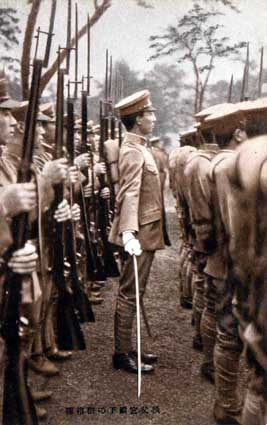
Prince Chichibu at Hirosaki

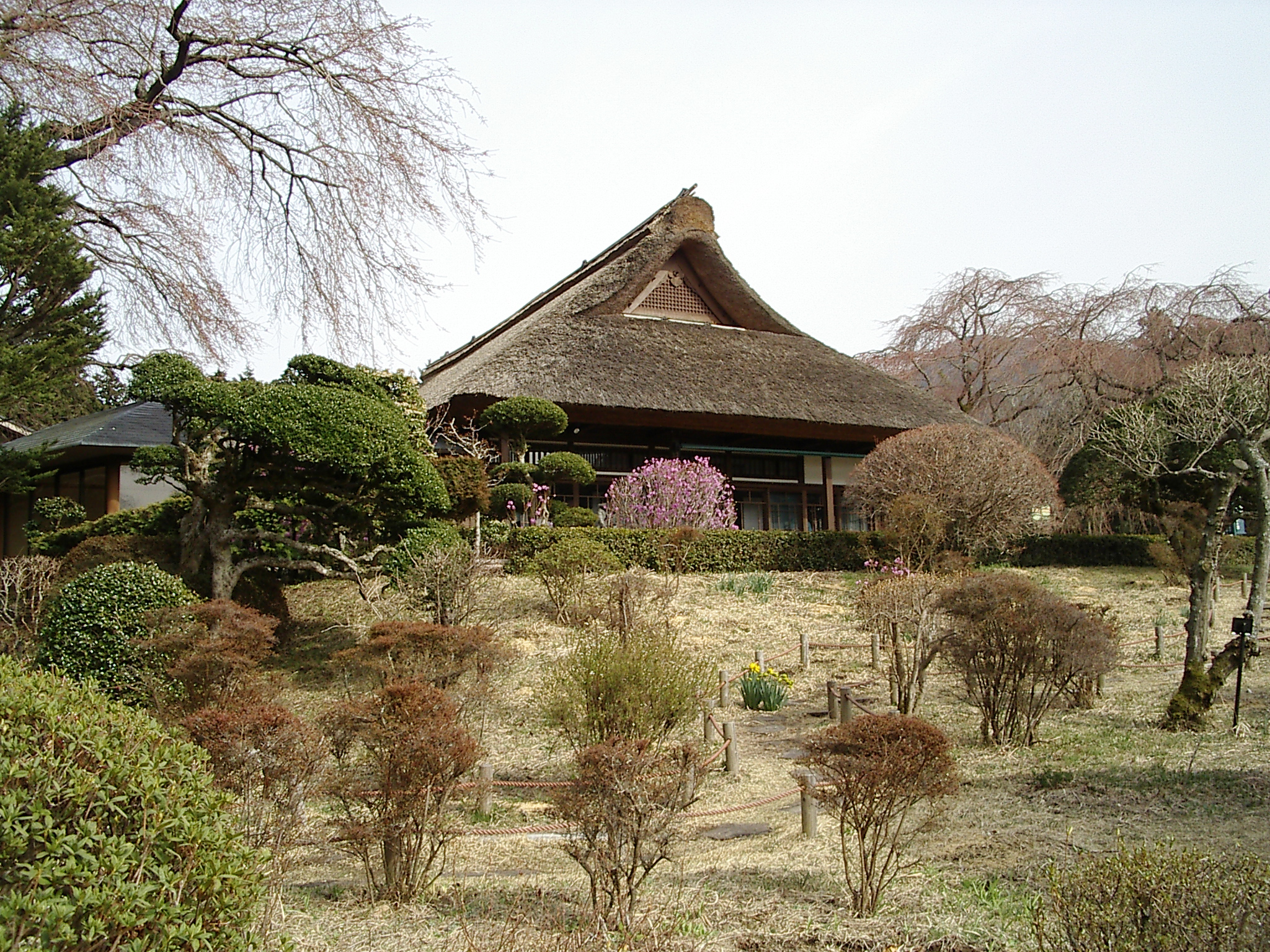
Former villa of Prince Chichibu in Gotemba

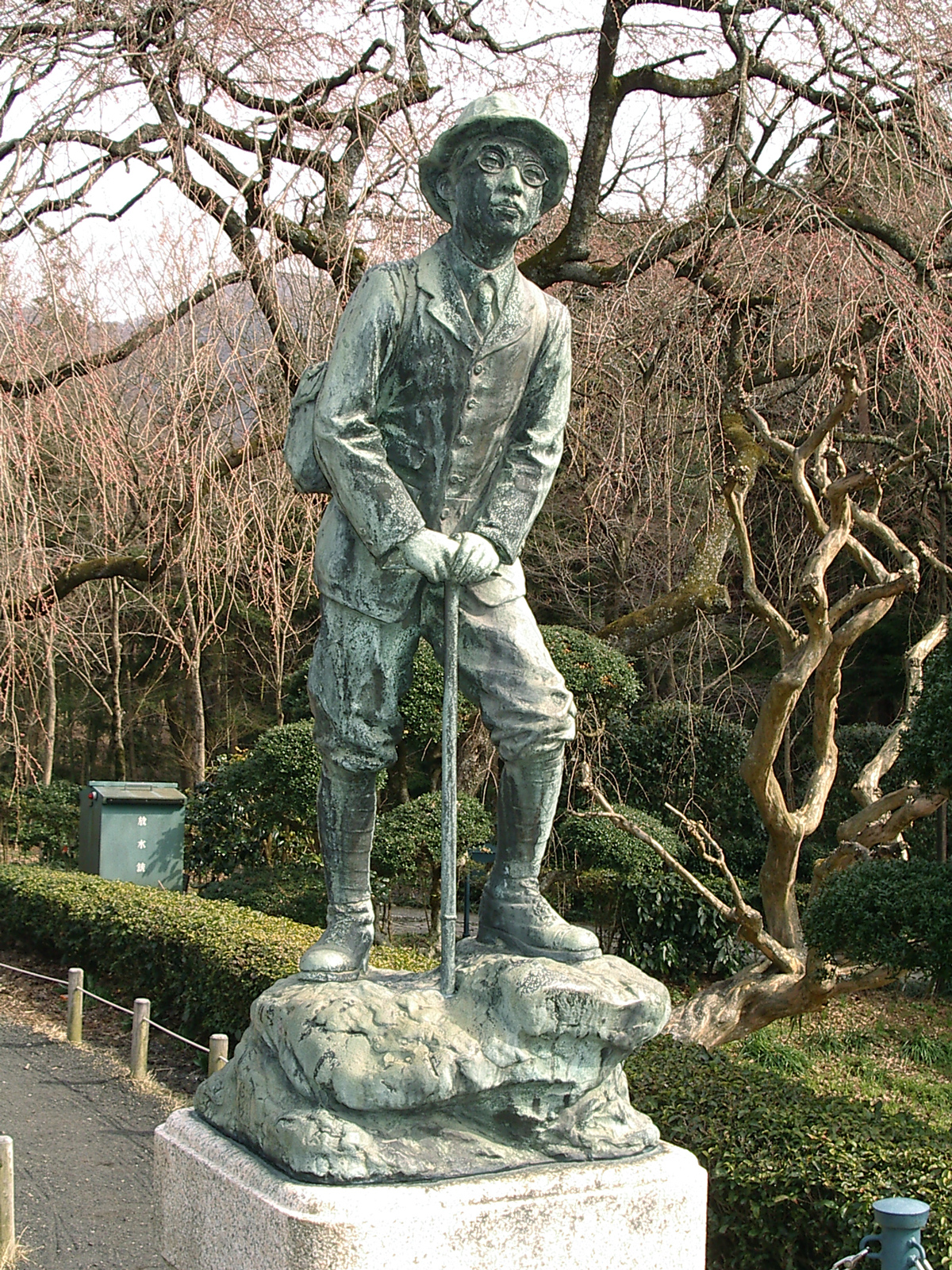
Statue of Prince Chichibu

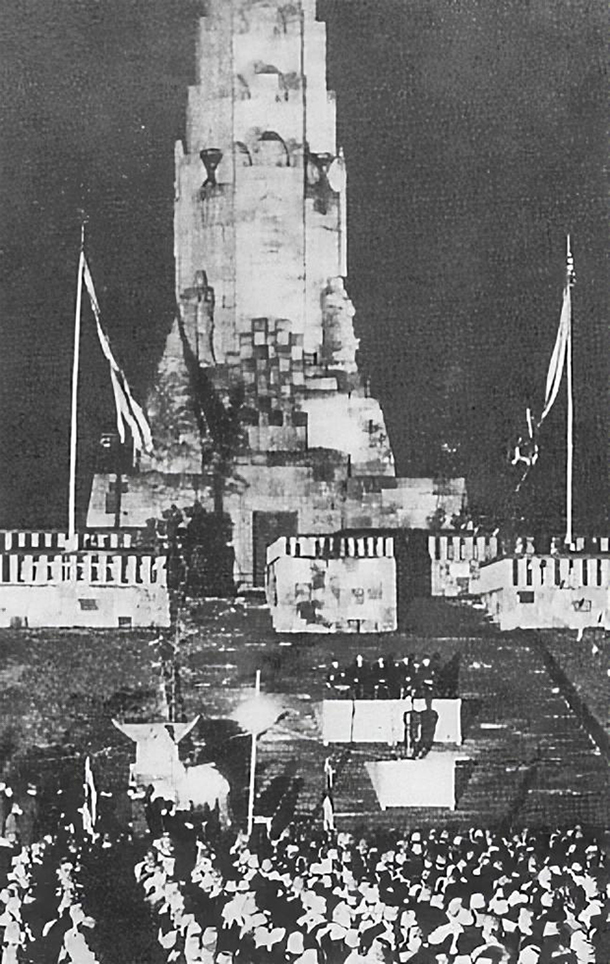
The hakkō ichiu monument (1940) had Prince Chichibu's calligraphy of Hakkō ichiu on its front side.

== See also ==
- Yamashita's gold - an urban legend about Prince Chichibu
