= Seiyōkan (Nabeshima residence) =

- 西洋館
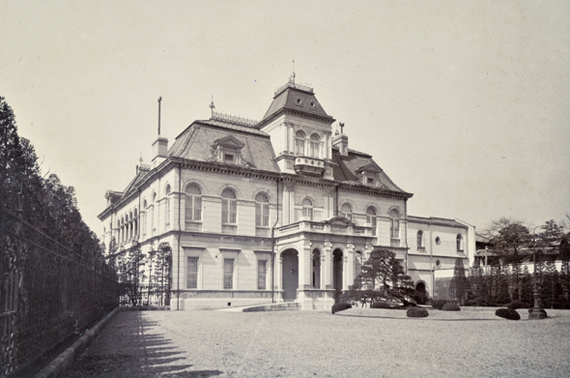
- Meiji-period photograph of the Seiyōkan

General information
- Location: Nagatachō, Tōkyō, Japan
- Opened: 1892
- Destroyed: 1 September 1923
- Owner: Nabeshima Naohiro

Design and construction
- Architects: Sakamoto Matatsune, Tatsuno Kingo, Katayama Tōkuma

The Seiyōkan (Japanese: 西洋館) was the Tōkyō residence of the Nabeshima clan from 1892 until its destruction in the 1923 Great Kantō earthquake.

== History ==
After the return of Nabeshima Naohiro, eleventh and final daimyō of the Saga Domain, from ministerial duties in Italy in 1882, he approached the architect Sakamoto Matatsune (坂本復経), first technical head of what is now Shimizu Corporation, to design a western-style building to serve as his Tōkyō residence. Construction began in 1884 and continued for three years, before being complicated by the architect's death. Tatsuno Kingo and, at one stage, Katayama Tōkuma were drafted in to oversee the remainder of the project, and works finished in 1892. On 9 July that year the Meiji Emperor visited, Empress Shōken attending the following day. The residence had a grand salon, large and small reception rooms, and a ballroom. It was destroyed in the Great Kantō earthquake in 1923.

== See also ==
- Chōkokan
