= Tsuneo Matsudaira =

Japanese diplomat and politician (1877–1949)

- 松平 恒雄
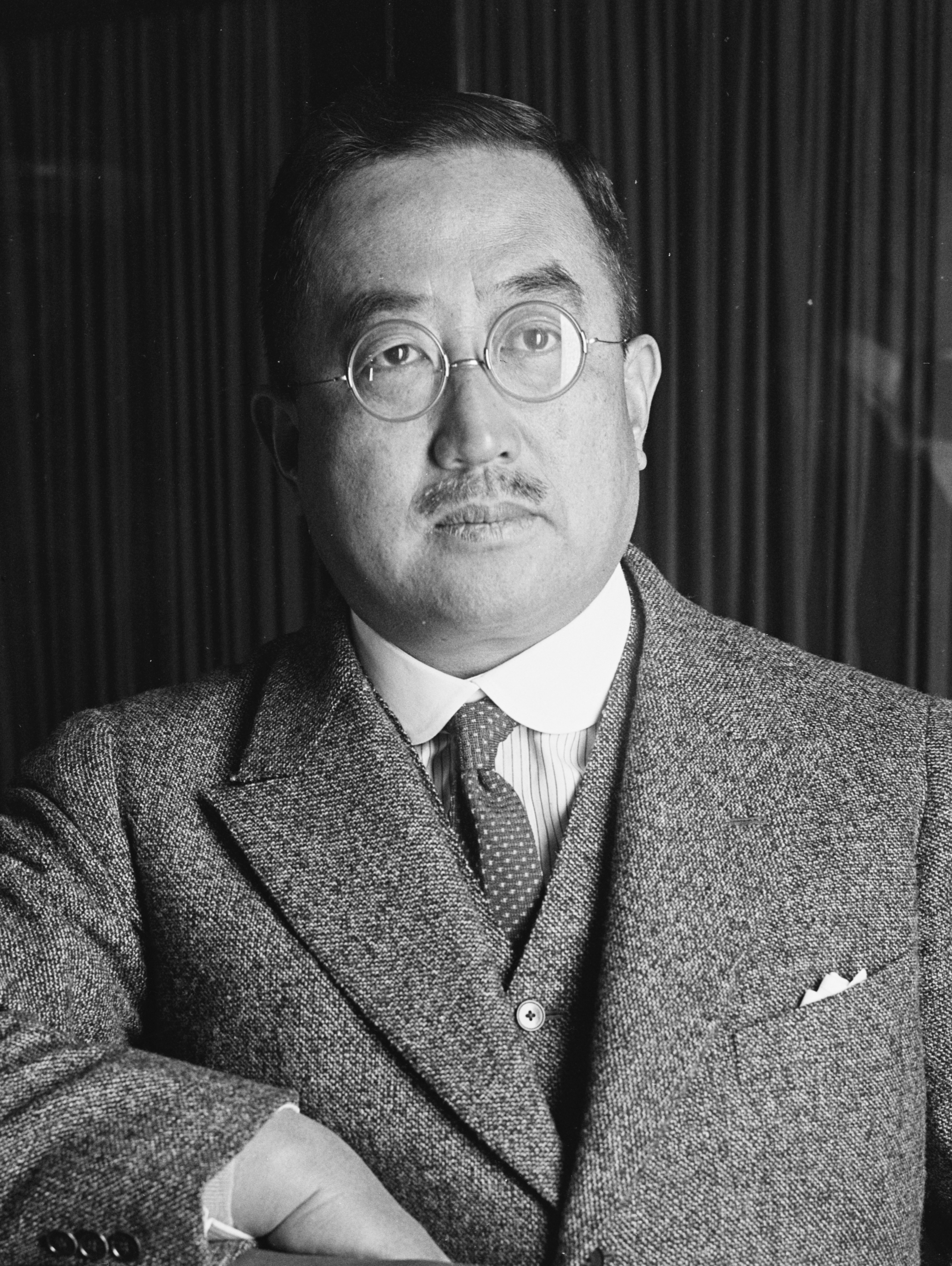
- Matsudaira in 1925

President of the House of Councillors
- In office 20 May 1947 – 14 November 1949
- Monarch: Hirohito
- Vice President: Jiichirō Matsumoto; Kisaku Matsushima
- Preceded by: Iemasa Tokugawa (as President of the House of Peers)
- Succeeded by: Naotake Satō

Minister of the Imperial Household
- In office 6 March 1936 – 4 June 1945
- Monarch: Hirohito
- Preceded by: Kurahei Yuasa
- Succeeded by: Sōtarō Ishiwata

Member of the House of Councillors
- In office 3 May 1947 – 14 November 1949
- Preceded by: Constituency established
- Succeeded by: Kan'ichirō Ishihara
- Constituency: Fukushima at-large

Member of the Privy Council
- In office 10 June 1946 – 27 March 1947
- Monarch: Hirohito

Personal details
- Born: 17 April 1877 Aizuwakamatsu, Fukushima, Japan
- Died: 14 November 1949 (aged 72) Shinagawa, Tokyo, Japan
- Spouse: Nobuko Nabeshima (m. 1906)
- Children: 3, including Setsuko, Princess Chichibu
- Parent: Matsudaira Katamori (father)
- Relatives: Tsunenari Tokugawa (grandson)
- Education: Tokyo Imperial University

Tsuneo Matsudaira (松平 恒雄, Matsudaira Tsuneo; 17 April 1877 – 14 November 1949) was a Japanese diplomat and politician who served as the first President of the House of Councillors from 1947 to 1949. He previously served as Ambassador to the United States from 1924 to 1928, to Britain from 1929 to 1936, and Minister of the Imperial Household from 1936 to 1945.

== Early life and career ==
Tsuneo Matsudaira was born on 17 April 1877, as the sixth son of Katamori Matsudaira, former daimyo of Aizu. Katamori was a prominent Tokugawa loyalist in the Boshin War, but had been shown clemency and later became a priest. The eldest son Kataharu took over the family headship and became a viscount when the nobility was reorganised in 1884.

After attending Gakushuin and the First Higher School, Matsudaira studied law and politics at Tokyo Imperial University. He graduated in 1902 and entered the Ministry of Foreign Affairs. In 1906 he married Nobuko Nabeshima, the daughter of Marquis Naohiro Nabeshima. It was a particularly prestigious connection as her older sister had married Prince Nashimoto. Rising in the Ministry, Matsudaira became director general of the European and American Affairs Bureau in 1920. He was promoted to Vice Minister for Foreign Affairs in 1923, before being appointed Ambassador to the United States the following year.

== Imperial marriage ==
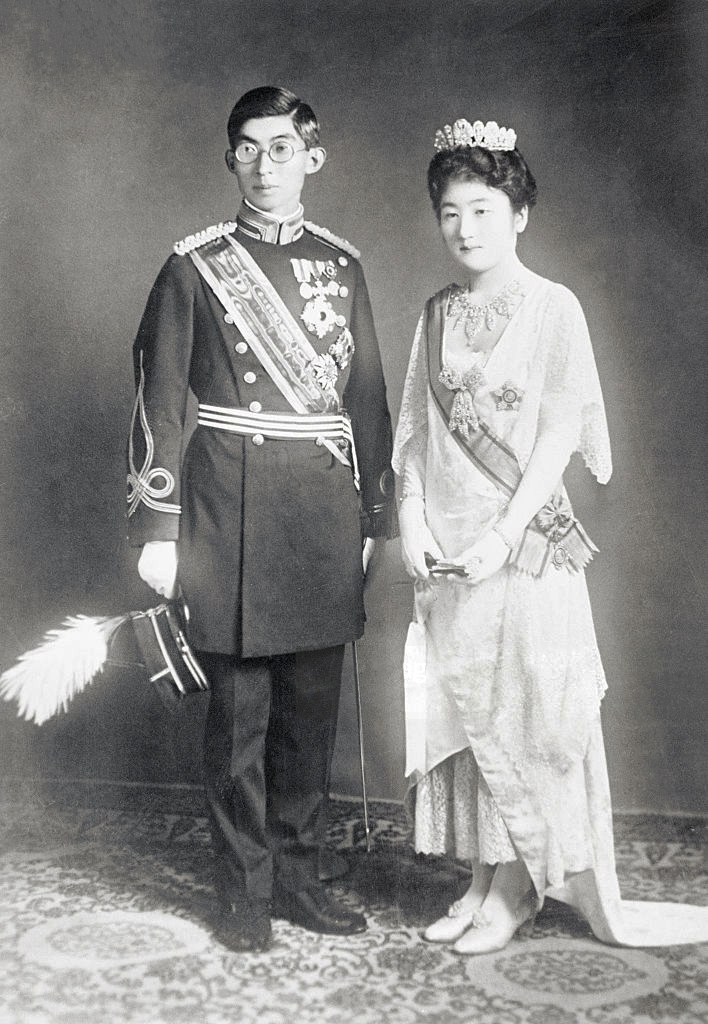
The Prince and Princess Chichibu on their wedding day

After he was called back to Japan in 1928, the Empress Dowager Sadako arranged for his daughter Setsuko to marry her second son Prince Chichibu. The wedding was celebrated in September.

Matsudaira was then sent to London as Ambassador to Britain from 1929. In that capacity he represented his country at the London Conference on Naval Armaments in 1930. During that conference, he was convinced to accept the ratio in ships which appeared humiliating to the Japanese government through the persuasion efforts of one of the US delegates, Senator David A. Reed, who in return agreed to grant the Japanese government better terms on non-combatant ships.

He returned to Japan in 1935. In October his second daughter Masako married the heir of Marquis Yoshichika Tokugawa and in December his son Ichiro married the daughter of Prince Iemasa Tokugawa.

After the Lord Keeper of the Privy Seal Makoto Saito was assassinated in the February 26 incident of 1936, the Minister of the Imperial Household Kurahei Yuasa was appointed to succeed him. Matsudaira was appointed to take over as Minister of the Imperial Household. He served in this position until June 1945, when he resigned to take responsibility for the destruction of a part of the Imperial Palace in the American firebombing of Tokyo. Towards the end of the war he was among the Japanese leaders who acknowledged that the war was lost and suggested searching for early surrender.

== Post-war political career ==
When Ichirō Hatoyama, the founder and president of the Liberal Party, was purged on the verge on becoming prime minister following the 1946 general election, Matsudaira was considered as a candidate to replace him, but Shigeru Yoshida was chosen instead.

In 1946 Matsudaira was appointed to the Privy Council, but this body was abolished when the 1947 constitution came into effect. Under the new constitution he was elected in the 1947 House of Councillors election. He formed the Ryokufūkai with other independents and was elected as the first President of the House. He died of a heart attack on 14 November 1949, at the age of 72. His tomb is in Aoyama Cemetery.

== Honors ==
From the corresponding Japanese Wikipedia article

=== Japanese decorations ===
- Grand Cordon of the Order of the Sacred Treasure (31 May 1924; Second Class: 1 November 1920; Third Class: 28 June 1919)
- Grand Cordon of the Order of the Rising Sun (11 April 1931; Fourth Class: 1 April 1916; Fifth Class: 24 August 1911; Sixth Class: 1 April 1906)

== Works ==
- Matsudaira, Tsuneo. "Sports and Physical Training in Modern Japan," Transactions and Proceedings of the Japan Society, London, 8 (1907/1909), 120

== Ancestry ==
Ancestors of Tsuneo Matsudaira

16. Tokugawa Harumori, 6th Lord of Mito (1751–1805)
8. Matsudaira Yoshinari, 9th Lord of Takasu (1776–1832)
17. Maeda Sayama
4. Matsudaira Yoshitatsu, 10th Lord of Takasu (1800–1862)
9. Hiramatsu
2. Matsudaira Katamori, 9th Lord of Aizu (1836–1893)
10. Komori
5. Komori Chiyoko
1. Matsudaira Tsuneo (1877–1949)
6. Kawamura Genbei
3. Kawamura Nagako

House of Councillors
New title	President of the House of Councillors; 1947–1949	Succeeded by Naotake Satō
Court offices
Preceded by Kurahei Yuasa	Minister of the Imperial Household; 1936–1945	Succeeded by Sōtarō Ishiwata
Diplomatic posts
Preceded by Matsui Keishirō	Japanese Ambassador to the United Kingdom; 1929–1935	Succeeded by Shigeru Yoshida
Preceded by Masanao Hanihara	Japanese Ambassador to the United States; 1924–1928	Succeeded by Katsuji Debuchi
Preceded by Tokichi Tanaka	Vice Minister for Foreign Affairs; 1923–1924	Succeeded by Katsuji Debuchi
