= Nobuko Matsudaira =

Japanese socialite

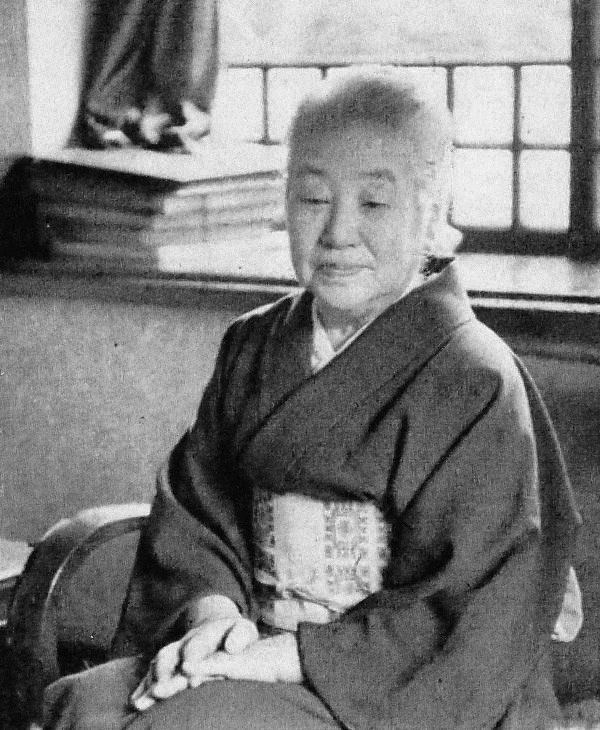
- Matsudaira from a 1956 magazine
- Born: Nobuko Nabeshima; 15 July 1886; Japan
- Died: 8 May 1969 (aged 82)
- Other names: Nobuko Nabeshima Matsudaira; Nobu Matsudaira
- Spouse: Tsuneo Matsudaira
- Children: 3, including Setsuko, Princess Chichibu
- Parents: Nabeshima Naohiro (Saga); Nabeshima Nagako
- Relatives: Nabeshima clan; Tsunenari Tokugawa (grandson)

Nobuko Matsudaira (松平信子, 15 July 1886 – 8 May 1969), also known as Madame Matsudaira, was a Japanese socialite. As the wife of a Japanese ambassador based in Washington, D.C. and London, she was well known as a political hostess in the West in the 1920s and 1930s.

== Early life ==
Nabeshima was born in 1886, the daughter of politician and college president Nabeshima Naohiro and Nabeshima Nagako, who was president of the Oriental Women's Association (東洋婦人会). She was a member of the powerful Nabeshima family. Nabeshima attended the Gakushuin Women's School, and was later president of the school's alumnae association.

== Career ==
Nabeshima was an aide and translator to Empress Teimei, whose son later married Nabeshima's daughter. She lived in Washington, D.C. as a political hostess, and traveled with her daughters from 1925 to 1928, while her husband was the Japanese Ambassador to the United States. She gave a public speech of gratitude in Boston in 1927. Her gowns were described in newspaper accounts of state dinners and other events. The family lived in London in 1909 (when daughter Setsuko was born) and from 1929 to 1935, when her husband was the Japanese Ambassador to the Court of St. James. She welcomed and promoted an international touring display of Japanese ceremonial dolls.

Madame Matsudaira wrote poetry. She assisted American writer Elizabeth Gray Vining, who described her as "grey-haired, serene, humorous, and wise." She was mentioned in two of Eleanor Roosevelt's "My Day" columns in May 1953, when Roosevelt was traveling in Japan.

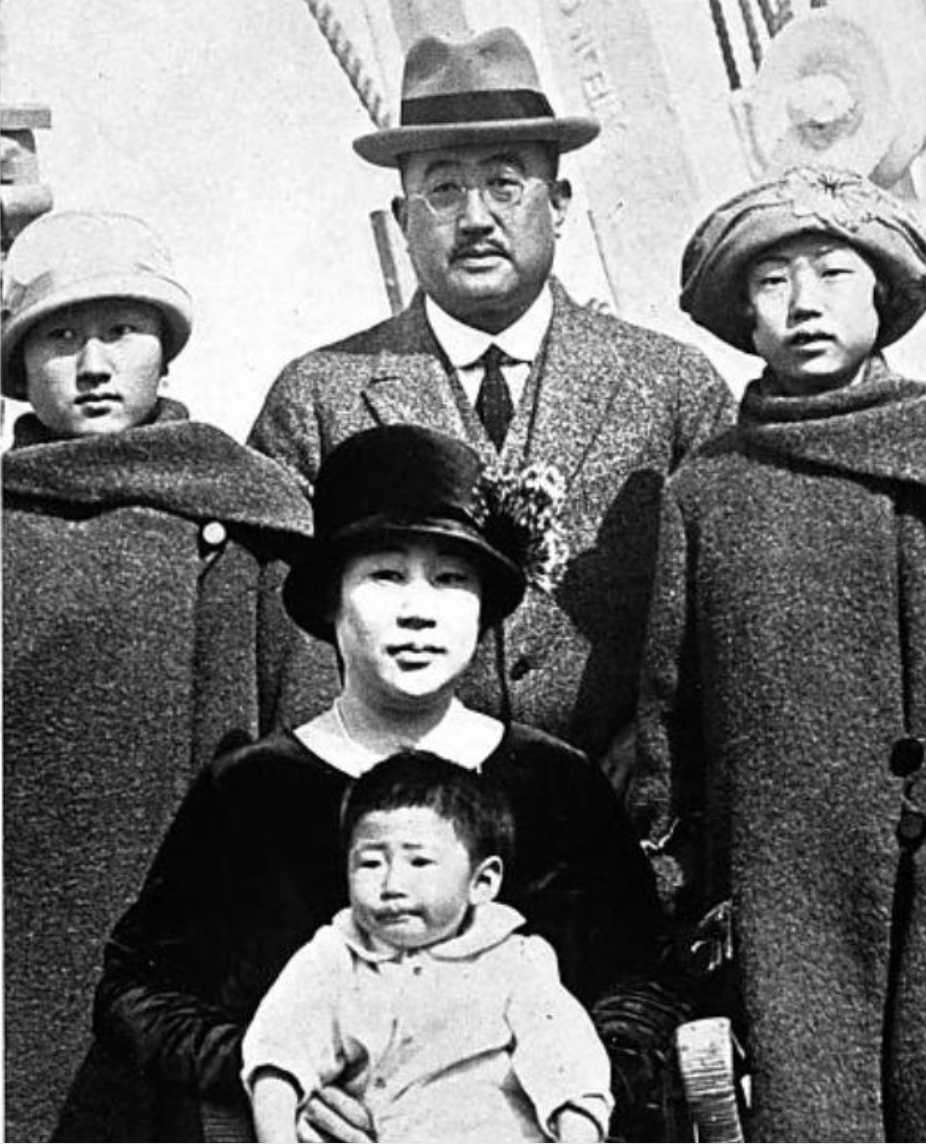
The Matsudaira family in 1925; Nobuko Nabeshima is seated holding her son; her husband and two daughters stand behind them

== Personal life ==
In 1906, Nabeshima married diplomat Tsuneo Matsudaira. Their son was Ichiro Matsudaira. One of their daughters was Setsuko, who became a princess in the Imperial House of Japan. One of the Matsudairas' grandchildren is Tsunenari Tokugawa, the 18th head of the Tokugawa clan, and one of their great-grandchildren is writer and translator Iehiro Tokugawa, who succeeded his father Tsunenari to the Tokugawa main line headship on 1 January 2023. Her husband died in 1949 and she lived with her widowed daughter after 1953; she eventually expired in 1969 at the age of 82.
