= Nabeshima Naohiro (Saga) =

Japanese politician

Junior First Rank Marquess Nabeshima Naohiro
- 鍋島 直大
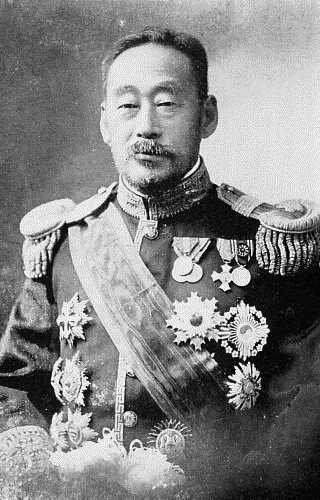

Member of the House of Peers
- In office February 1890 – 19 June 1921 Hereditary peerage

Member of the Genrōin
- In office 31 May 1882 – 15 February 1886

Governor of Saga Domain
- In office 1869–1871
- Monarch: Meiji
- Preceded by: Himself (as Daimyō of Saga)
- Succeeded by: Position abolished

Daimyō of Saga Domain
- In office 1861–1869
- Shōgun: Tokugawa Iemochi; Tokugawa Yoshinobu
- Preceded by: Nabeshima Naomasa
- Succeeded by: Himself (as Governor of Saga)

Personal details
- Born: 17 October 1846 Edo, Musashi, Japan
- Died: 19 June 1921 (aged 74) Nagatachō, Tokyo, Japan
- Resting place: Aoyama Cemetery
- Spouse: Nabeshima Nagako (m. 1881)
- Children: Princess Itsuko Nashimoto; Nabeshima Nobuko
- Parent: Nabeshima Naomasa (father)

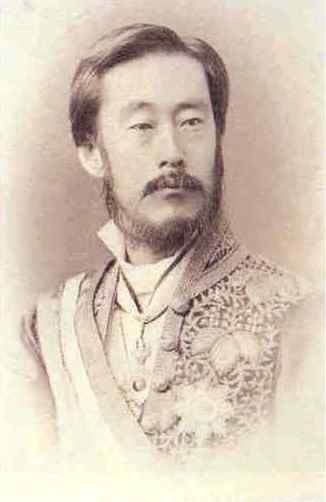
Nabeshima Naohiro in Meiji court uniform

Nabeshima Naohiro or Nabeshima Chokudai (鍋島 直大; 17 October 1846 – 19 June 1921) was the 11th and final daimyō of Saga Domain in Hizen Province, Kyūshū, Japan. Before the Meiji Restoration, his name was Nabeshima Mochizane (鍋島 茂実) and his honorary title was Hizen-no-Kami.

== Biography ==
Naohiro was the second son of Nabeshima Naomasa, the 10th daimyō of Saga. On the retirement of his father in 1861, Naohiro was appointed 11th (and final) daimyō of Saga Domain.

During the Boshin War of the Meiji Restoration, he led Saga’s forces as a component the Satchō Alliance in support of Emperor Meiji, after the Battle of Toba–Fushimi and fought against the Tokugawa remnants at the Battle of Ueno and in the various campaigns in northern Japan against the Ōuetsu Reppan Dōmei.

With the abolition of the han system, he surrendered his domain to the central government, and departed Japan with his two younger brothers for studies in Great Britain starting 1871. He was appointed plenipotentiary minister to Rome in 1880, and returned to Japan in 1882. During his stay in England, he was appointed as official representative of Japan to the Court of St. James's by the Japanese government. After his return to Japan, he served in various political capacities, including president of the Genrōin, advisor to Emperor Meiji (and later Emperor Taishō), and as a member of the House of Peers. He was created marquis (侯爵, kōshaku) in the Peerage Act of 7 July 1884. From 1911, he was president of Kokugakuin University.

His connections with the Imperial Family of Japan were strong. His second daughter Princess Nashimoto Itsuko became the wife of Prince Nashimoto Morimasa. This marriage produced for Naohiro two granddaughters, the elder of whom named Masako who became known as Bangja, consort to the heir to the Korean Yi dynasty. Naohiro's fourth daughter named Nobuko married Tsuneo Matsudaira and one of their daughters became Princess Chichibu. She also gave birth to Ichirō Matsudaira, who married Toyoko Tokugawa, Iemasa Tokugawa's daughter, and gave birth to Tsunenari Tokugawa, the eighteenth head of the Tokugawa clan. Naoharu died in 1921 and his grave is located at Aoyama Cemetery in Tokyo.

Preceded by Nabeshima Naomasa	11th Daimyō of Saga; 1861–1871	Succeeded by None (domain abolished)
