= Setsuko, Princess Chichibu =

Japanese princess (1909–1995)

Setsuko
- Princess Chichibu
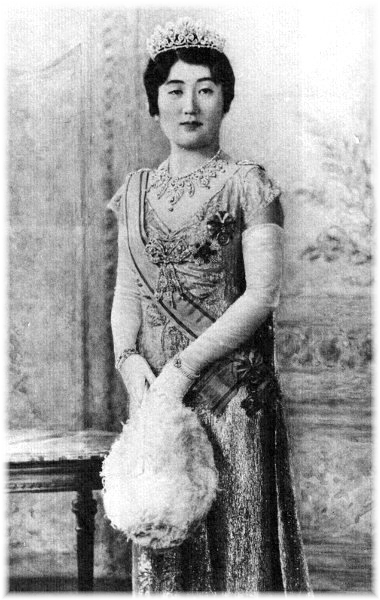
- Setsuko, c. 1928
- Born: Setsuko Matsudaira (松平節子); 9 September 1909; Walton-on-Thames, England
- Died: 25 August 1995 (aged 85); Tokyo, Japan
- Burial: Toshimagaoka Imperial Cemetery, Bunkyō, Tokyo
- Spouse: Yasuhito, Prince Chichibu (m. 1928; died 1953)
- House: Matsudaira clan (by birth); Imperial House of Japan (by marriage)
- Father: Tsuneo Matsudaira
- Mother: Nobuko Nabeshima

Setsuko, Princess Chichibu (雍仁親王妃勢津子, Yasuhito Shinnōhi Setsuko; born Setsuko Matsudaira (松平節子, Matsudaira Setsuko); 9 September 1909 – 25 August 1995) was a member of the Japanese imperial family and the wife of Yasuhito, Prince Chichibu, the second son of Emperor Taishō and Empress Teimei. Setsuko was a sister-in-law of Emperor Shōwa and an aunt by marriage of Emperor Akihito.

== Early life ==
Setsuko Matsudaira was born on 9 September 1909 in Walton-on-Thames, England, into the prominent Matsudaira family. Her father, Tsuneo Matsudaira, was a diplomat and politician who later served as the Japanese ambassador to the United States (1924) and later to United Kingdom (1928), and still later, Imperial Household Minister (1936–45, 1946–47). Her mother, Nobuko Nabeshima, was a member of the Nabeshima family. Her paternal grandfather, Katamori Matsudaira, was the last daimyō of the Aizu Domain and head of the Aizu-Matsudaira cadet branch of the Tokugawa. Her maternal grandfather, Marquis Naohiro Nabeshima, was the former daimyō of the Saga Domain. Her mother's elder sister, Itsuko (1882–1976), married Prince Morimasa Nashimoto, an uncle of Empress Kōjun. Despite her prestigious heritage, Setsuko was technically born a commoner, but both sides of her family maintained kinship with distinguished kazoku aristocratic families close to the Japanese Imperial Family.

From 1925 to 1928, Setsuko was educated at the Sidwell Friends School in Washington, D.C. while her father was ambassador to the United States. Setsuko was fluent in English and was sometimes considered to be a Kikokushijo. Upon her return to Japan, Setsuko was chosen by Empress Teimei to marry her second son, Yasuhito, Prince Chichibu, despite the fact she was a commoner. Setsuko married the Prince after her uncle, Viscount Morio Matsudaira, formally adopted her, thus removing the status incongruity between the prince and his bride.

== Marriage ==
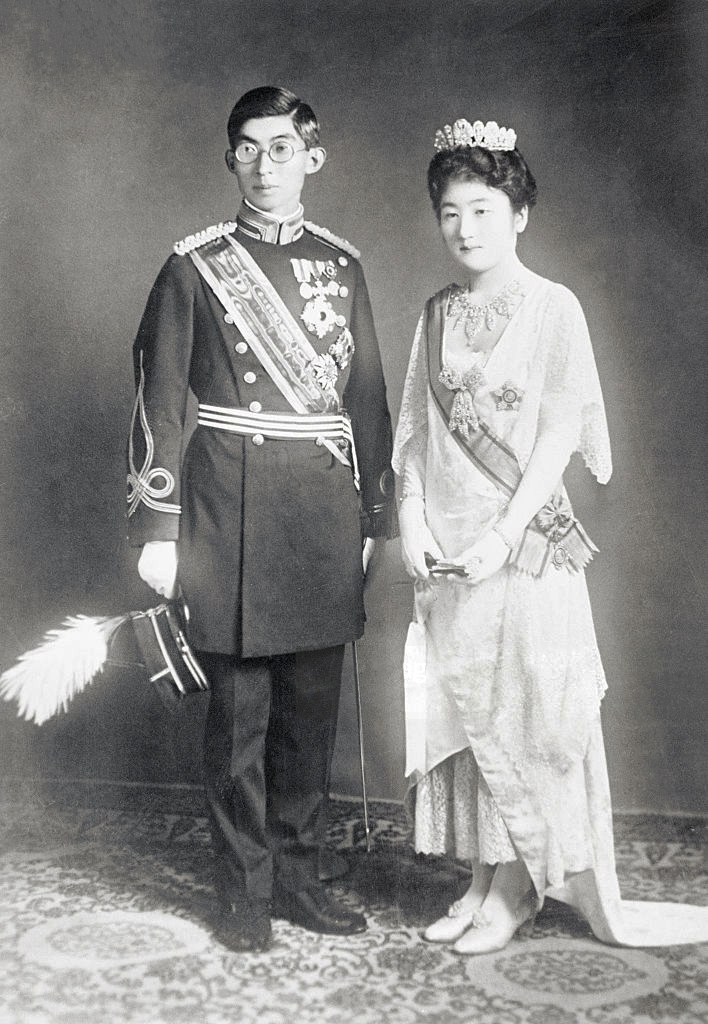
The Prince and Princess Chichibu on their wedding day

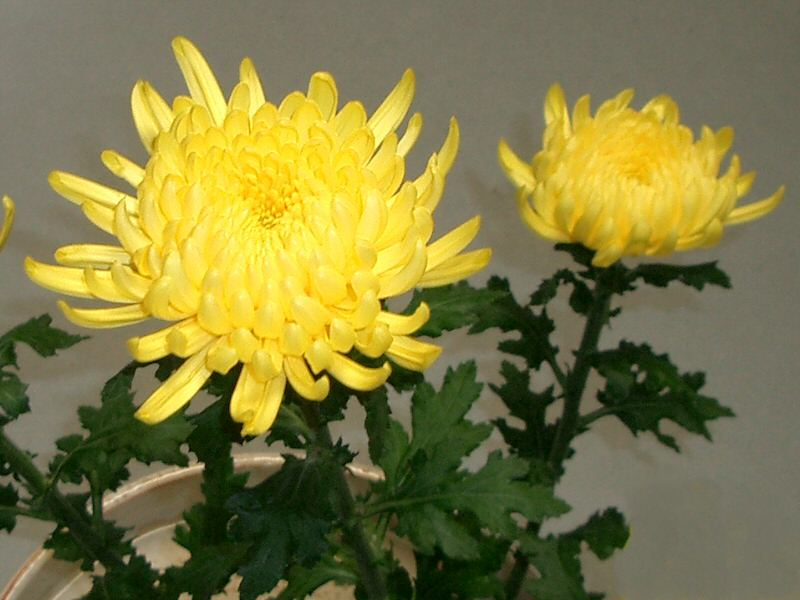
Chrysanthemum × morifolium, designated imperial personal emblem of Setsuko

On 28 September 1928, aged 19, Setsuko wed Prince Chichibu, and became Princess Chichibu. The bride and groom were eighth cousins, thrice removed, as both were descended from Nabeshima Katsushige, the first lord of Saga. Prince and Princess Chichibu had no children, as Princess Chichibu's only pregnancy ended in a miscarriage. However, by all accounts their marriage was filled with love and happiness for each other.

In 1937, the prince and princess were sent on a tour of Western Europe which took several months. They represented Japan at the May 1937 coronation of King George VI and Queen Elizabeth in Westminster Abbey and subsequently visited Sweden and the Netherlands as the guests of King Gustav V and Queen Wilhelmina, respectively. Princess Chichibu stayed in Switzerland while her husband met Adolf Hitler in Nuremberg at the end of the trip. Princess Chichibu felt a great love for the United States and for the United Kingdom and, as an anglophile, was greatly saddened by Japan's entry into the Second World War on the side of the Axis powers.

== Widowhood ==
After the Prince's death of tuberculosis in 1953, Princess Chichibu became president of the Society for the Prevention of Tuberculosis, honorary president of the Britain-Japan Society, the Sweden-Japan Society, and an honorary vice president of the Japanese Red Cross The Princess made several semi-official visits to Great Britain and Sweden.

== Death ==
Princess Chichibu died from heart failure in Tokyo on 25 August 1995, shortly before her 86th birthday. Princess Chichibu's autobiography, which was published posthumously as The Silver Drum: A Japanese Imperial Memoir, was translated into English by Dorothy Britton.

== Honours ==
National

- Grand Cordon of the Order of the Precious Crown, 1st Class - 28 September 1928

Foreign

- United Kingdom: Dame Grand Cross of the Most Distinguished Order of Saint Michael and Saint George

== Ancestry ==
Ancestors of Setsuko, Princess Chichibu

8. Matsudaira Yoshitatsu, 10th Lord of Takasu (1800–1862)
4. Matsudaira Katamori, 9th Lord of Aizu (1836–1893)
9. Komori Chiyoko
2. Matsudaira Tsuneo (1877–1949)
10. Kawamura Genbei
5. Kawamura Nagako
1. Setsuko, Princess Chichibu
12. Nabeshima Naomasa, 10th Lord of Saga (1815–1871)
6. Marquess Nabeshima Naohiro, 11th Lord of Saga (1846–1921)
13. Tokugawa Tatsuko (1830–1886)
3. Lady Nabeshima Nobuko (1886–1969)
14. Hirohashi Taneyasu (1819–1876)
7. Hirohashi Nagako (1855–1941)

=== Patrilineal descent ===
Patrilineal descent

Setsuko's patriline is the line from which she is descended father to son.

The existence of a verifiable link between the Nitta clan and the Tokugawa/Matsudaira clan remains somewhat in dispute.

1. Descent prior to Keitai is unclear to modern historians, but traditionally traced back patrilineally to Emperor Jimmu
2. Emperor Keitai, ca. 450–534
3. Emperor Kinmei, 509–571
4. Emperor Bidatsu, 538–585
5. Prince Oshisaka, ca. 556–???
6. Emperor Jomei, 593–641
7. Emperor Tenji, 626–671
8. Prince Shiki, ????–716
9. Emperor Kōnin, 709–786
10. Emperor Kanmu, 737–806
11. Emperor Saga, 786–842
12. Emperor Ninmyō, 810–850
13. Emperor Montoku 826–858
14. Emperor Seiwa, 850–881
15. Prince Sadazumi, 873–916
16. Minamoto no Tsunemoto, 894–961
17. Minamoto no Mitsunaka, 912–997
18. Minamoto no Yorinobu, 968–1048
19. Minamoto no Yoriyoshi, 988–1075
20. Minamoto no Yoshiie, 1039–1106
21. Minamoto no Yoshikuni, 1091–1155
22. Minamoto no Yoshishige, 1114–1202
23. Nitta Yoshikane, 1139–1206
24. Nitta Yoshifusa, 1162–1195
25. Nitta Masayoshi, 1187–1257
26. Nitta Masauji, 1208–1271
27. Nitta Motouji, 1253–1324
28. Nitta Tomouji, 1274–1318
29. Nitta Yoshisada, 1301–1338
30. Nitta Yoshimune, 1331?–1368
31. Tokugawa Chikasue?, ????–???? (speculated)
32. Tokugawa Arichika, ????–????
33. Matsudaira Chikauji, d. 1393?
34. Matsudaira Yasuchika, ????–14??
35. Matsudaira Nobumitsu, c. 1404–1488/89?
36. Matsudaira Chikatada, 1430s–1501
37. Masudaira Nagachika, 1473–1544
38. Matsudaira Nobutada, 1490–1531
39. Matsudaira Kiyoyasu, 1511–1536
40. Matsudaira Hirotada, 1526–1549
41. Tokugawa Ieyasu, 1st Tokugawa Shōgun (1543–1616)
42. Tokugawa Yorifusa, 1st Lord of Mito (1603–1661)
43. Matsudaira Yorishige, 1st Lord of Takamatsu (1622–1695)
44. Matsudaira Yoriyuki (1661–1687)
45. Matsudaira Yoritoyo, 3rd Lord of Takamatsu (1680–1735)
46. Tokugawa Munetaka, 4th Lord of Mito (1705–1730)
47. Tokugawa Munemoto, 5th Lord of Mito (1728–1766)
48. Tokugawa Harumori, 6th Lord of Mito (1751–1805)
49. Matsudaira Yoshinari, 9th Lord of Takasu (1776–1832)
50. Matsudaira Yoshitatsu, 10th Lord of Takasu (1800–1862)
51. Matsudaira Katamori, 9th Lord of Aizu (1836–1893)
52. Tsuneo Matsudaira, (1877–1949)
53. Setsuko Matsudaira, (1909–1995)
