= Kikuko, Princess Takamatsu =

Japanese princess (1911–2004)

Kikuko
- Princess Takamatsu
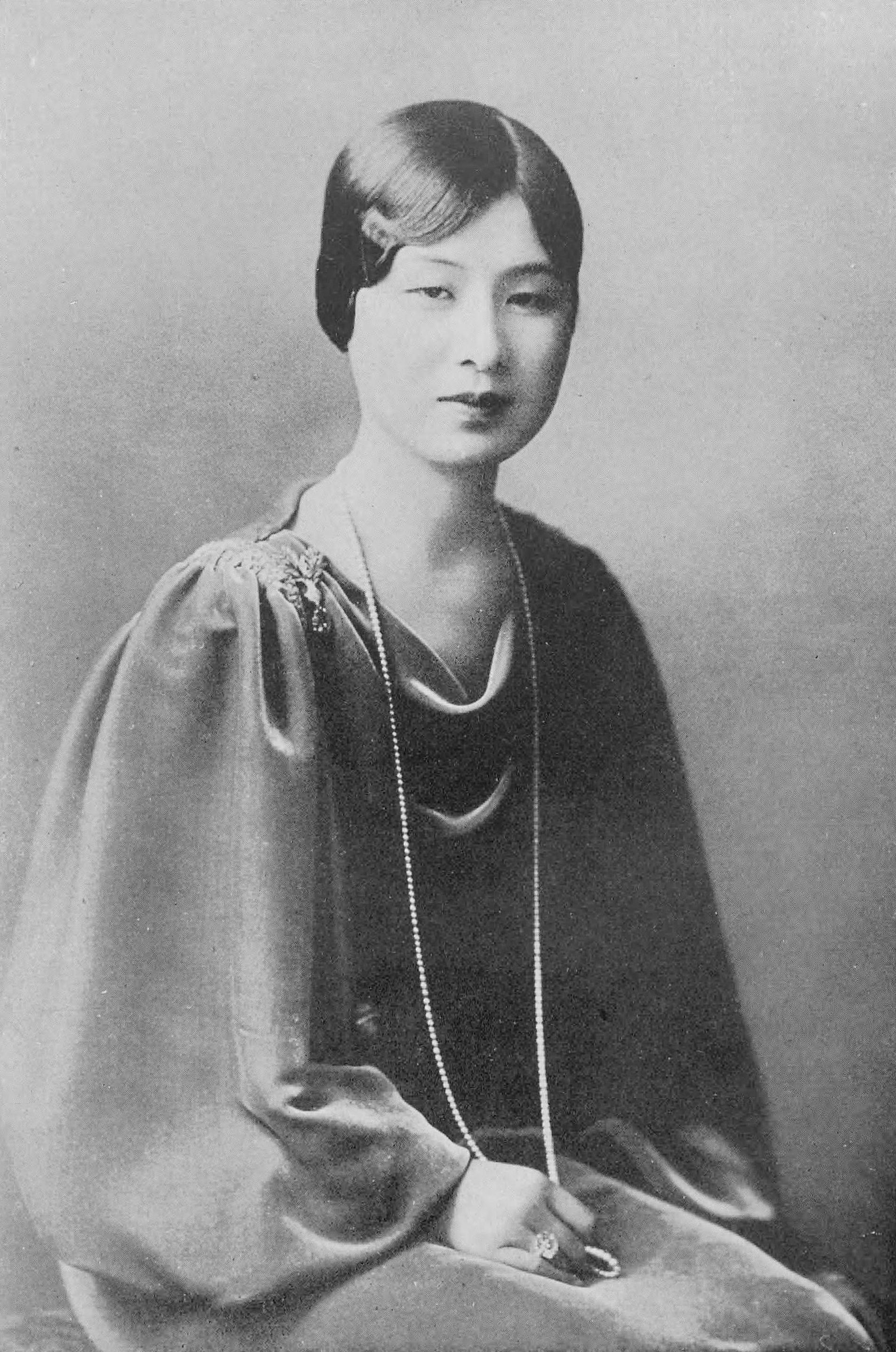
- Kikuko in the 1930s
- Born: Kikuko Tokugawa (徳川喜久子); 26 December 1911; Tokyo City, Japan
- Died: 18 December 2004 (aged 92); St. Luke's International Hospital, Chūō, Tokyo, Japan
- Burial: 27 December 2004; Toshimagaoka Imperial Cemetery, Bunkyo, Tokyo
- Spouse: Nobuhito, Prince Takamatsu (m. 1930; died 1987)
- House: Tokugawa clan (by birth); Imperial House of Japan (by marriage)
- Father: Yoshihisa Tokugawa
- Mother: Princess Mieko of Arisugawa

Kikuko, Princess Takamatsu (宣仁親王妃喜久子, Nobuhito Shinnōhi Kikuko), born Tokugawa Kikuko (徳川喜久子; 26 December 1911 – 18 December 2004), was a member of the Japanese imperial family. The Princess was married to Nobuhito, Prince Takamatsu, the third son of Emperor Taishō and Empress Teimei. She was, therefore, a sister-in-law of Emperor Shōwa and an aunt by marriage of the following emperor, Akihito. She was mainly known for philanthropic activities, particularly her patronage of cancer research organizations. At the time of her death, Princess Takamatsu was the oldest member of the Imperial Family.

== Early life ==
Born in Tokyo on 26 December 1911, she was the second daughter of Yoshihisa Tokugawa, a peer, and his wife Princess Mieko of Arisugawa. Her paternal grandfather was Yoshinobu Tokugawa, Japan's last shōgun. Her maternal grandfather, Prince Takehito Arisugawa, was the seventh head of the Arisugawa-no-miya, one of the four shinnōke or collateral branches of the Imperial Family during the Edo period entitled to provide a successor to the throne in default of a direct heir. Lady Kikuko Tokugawa received her primary and secondary education at the then-girls' department of the Gakushuin. At age eighteen, she became engaged to Prince Takamatsu, who was then third-in-line to the Chrysanthemum Throne. By virtue of her descent from the Arisugawa-no-miya, Lady Kikuko and Prince Takamatsu were related. Both were direct descendants of Emperor Reigen, making them sixth cousins twice removed. Prince Takamatsu was a seven-times great-grandchild of the Reigen Emperor, while Lady Kikuko was a five-times great-grandchild of Reigen.

== Marriage ==
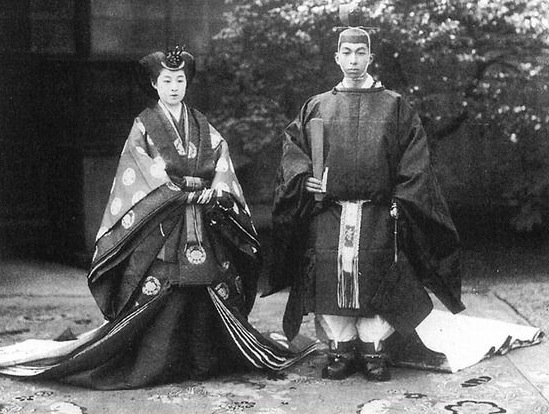
Wedding of Nobuhito, Prince Takamatsu and Kikuko Tokugawa (4 February 1930)

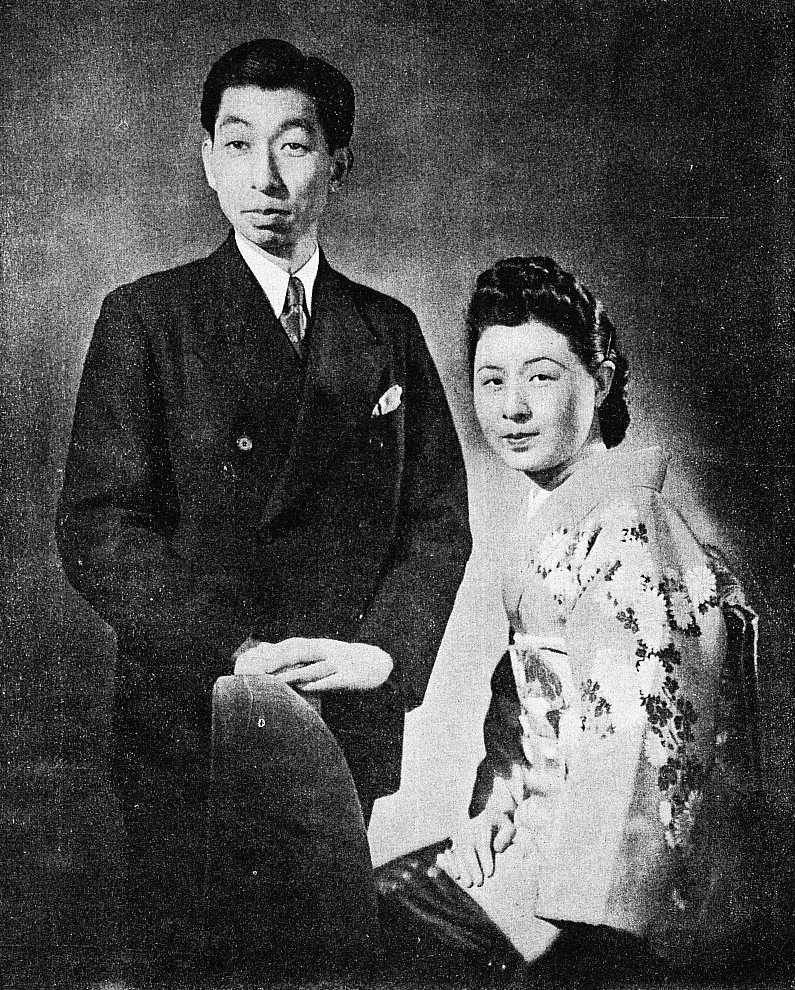
Prince and Princess Takamatsu, c. 1950

On 4 February 1930, she married Prince Takamatsu at the Tokyo Imperial Palace. The couple had no children. Shortly after the wedding, Prince and Princess Takamatsu embarked upon a world tour, partly to return the courtesies shown to them by King George V of the United Kingdom in sending a mission to Tokyo to present Emperor Shōwa with the Order of the Garter. During their journey, they travelled across the United States so as to strengthen the goodwill and understanding between their nations. The 1930 photo illustration comes from the illustrated biography on Prince Iesato Tokugawa titled The Art of Peace. The photo presents Princess and Prince Takamatsu during their reception by U.S. President Herbert Hoover.

The Prince and Princess returned to Japan in June 1931 and took up residence in Takanawa in Minato, Tokyo.

Following her mother's death from bowel cancer in 1933, Princess Takamatsu became a champion of cancer research. Using money donated by the public, she established the Princess Takamatsu Cancer Research Fund in 1968, organizing symposia and awarding scientists for groundbreaking work. She also served as president of an organization extending relief to leprosy patients. The Princess also served as the honorary president of the "Saiseikai" Imperial Gift Foundation Inc., Tofu Kyokai Foundation, Shadan Houjin Tokyo Jikeikai, Nichifutsu Kyokai, and Nichifutsu Kaikan, and as an honorary vice-president of the Japanese Red Cross Society.

== Unconventional frankness ==
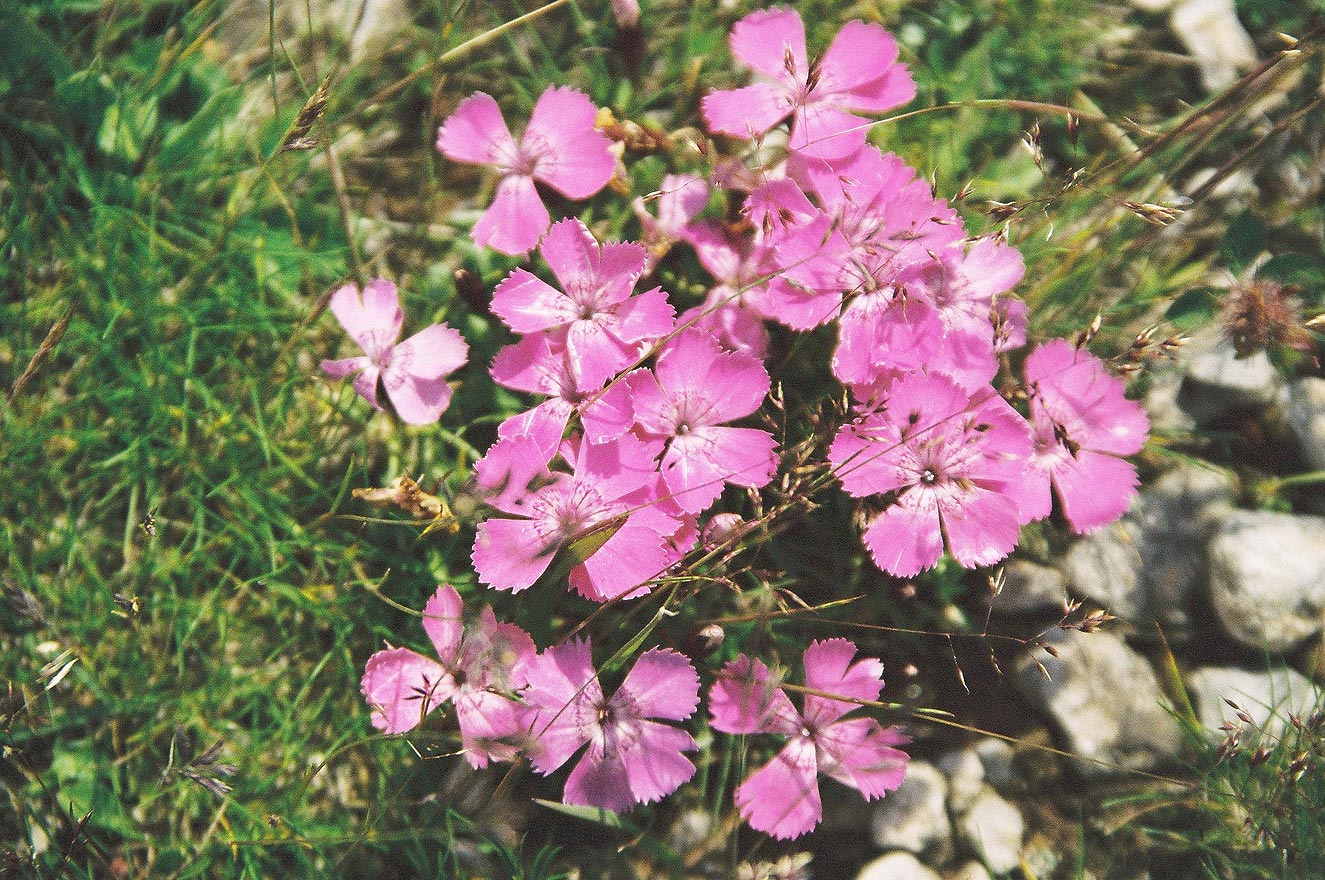
Dianthus, designated imperial personal emblem of Kikuko

In 1991, Princess Takamatsu and an aide discovered a twenty one volume diary, written in Prince Takamatsu's own hand between 1922 and 1947. Despite opposition from the Imperial Household Agency, she gave the diary to the magazine Chūōkōron which published excerpts in 1995. The diary revealed that Prince Takamatsu opposed the Kwantung Army's incursions in Manchuria in September 1931, the expansion of the July 1937 Marco Polo Bridge Incident into a full-scale war against China, and had warned his brother Hirohito in November 1941 that the Navy could not fight more than two years against the United States.

After the death of her sister-in-law Empress Kōjun in 2000, Princess Takamatsu became the oldest member of the Imperial Family. In 2001, after Crown Prince Naruhito and Crown Princess Masako had a daughter, Princess Takamatsu, at age 90, became the first member of the Imperial Family to publicly call for changes to the 1947 Imperial Household Law, which limits the succession to the Chrysanthemum Throne to legitimate males in the male line of descent. In an article she wrote for the January/February 2002 issue of a women's magazine, she argued that having a female emperor was "not unnatural" since women had assumed the throne in the past, most recently in the early nineteenth century.

Princess Takamatsu died of sepsis at St. Luke's Medical Center in Tokyo on 18 December 2004, eight days before her 93rd birthday. She had been in and out of the hospital with various ailments during the last decade of her life. Her funeral was held on 27 December at Toshimagaoka cemetery in Tokyo's Bunkyō Ward with Prince Tomohito of Mikasa as the chief mourner. 560 mourners including members of the imperial family and Prime Minister Junichiro Koizumi were in attendance. Her body was cremated in Shinjuku Ward and her ashes were placed in her husband's tomb. She was the last surviving member of the imperial family who was born during the Meiji period.

== Honours ==
=== National ===
- Dame Grand Cordon of the Order of the Precious Crown (4 February 1930)

=== Foreign ===
- Spain: Dame of the Royal Order of Queen Maria Luisa (16 November 1930)
