= Nobuhito, Prince Takamatsu =

Japanese prince (1905–1987)

Nobuhito
- Prince Takamatsu
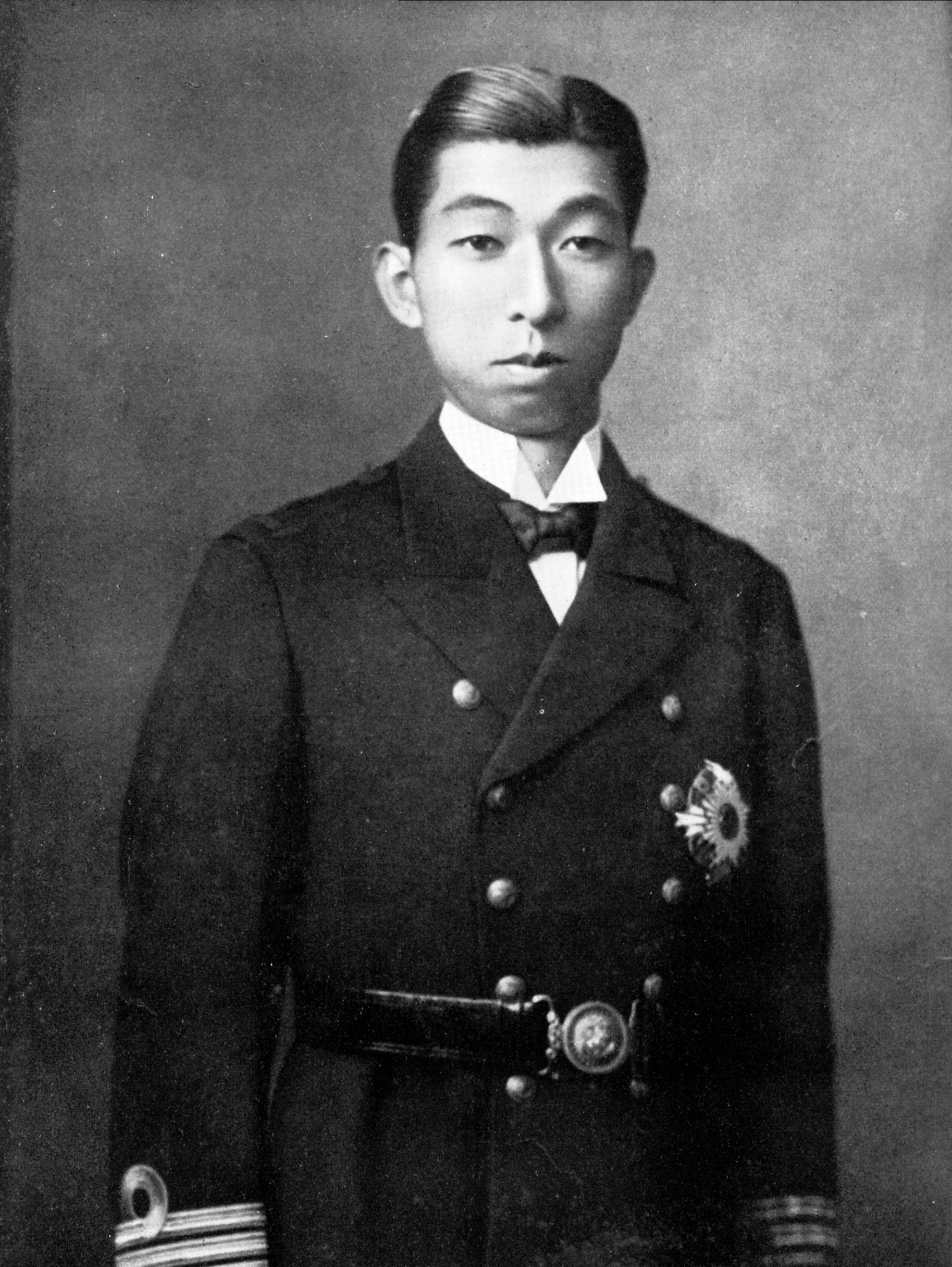
- Nobuhito in 1940
- Born: Nobuhito, Prince Teru (光宮宣仁親王); 3 January 1905; Aoyama Detached Palace, Tokyo City, Japan
- Died: 3 February 1987 (aged 82); Japanese Red Cross Medical Center, Shibuya, Tokyo, Japan
- Burial: 10 February 1987; Toshimagaoka Imperial Cemetery, Bunkyo, Tokyo
- Spouse: Kikuko Tokugawa (m. 1930)
- House: Imperial House of Japan
- Father: Emperor Taishō
- Mother: Sadako Kujō
- Military career
- Allegiance: Empire of Japan
- Branch: Imperial Japanese Navy
- Service years: 1924–1945
- Rank: Captain
- Units: Fusō; Imperial Japanese Navy General Staff
- Conflicts: Second Sino-Japanese War; World War II
- Awards: Order of the Golden Kite (4th Class); China War Medal

Nobuhito, Prince Takamatsu (高松宮宣仁親王, Takamatsu-no-miya Nobuhito Shinnō; 3 January 1905 – 3 February 1987) was the third son of Emperor Taishō (Yoshihito) and Empress Teimei (Sadako) and a younger brother of Emperor Shōwa (Hirohito). He became heir to the Takamatsu-no-miya (formerly Arisugawa-no-miya), one of the four shinnōke or branches of the imperial family entitled to inherit the Chrysanthemum Throne in default of a direct heir. From the mid-1920s until the end of World War II, Prince Takamatsu pursued a career in the Japanese Imperial Navy, eventually rising to the rank of captain. Following the war, the prince became patron or honorary president of various organizations in the fields of international cultural exchange, the arts, sports, and medicine. He is mainly remembered for his philanthropic activities as a member of the Imperial House of Japan.

== Early life ==
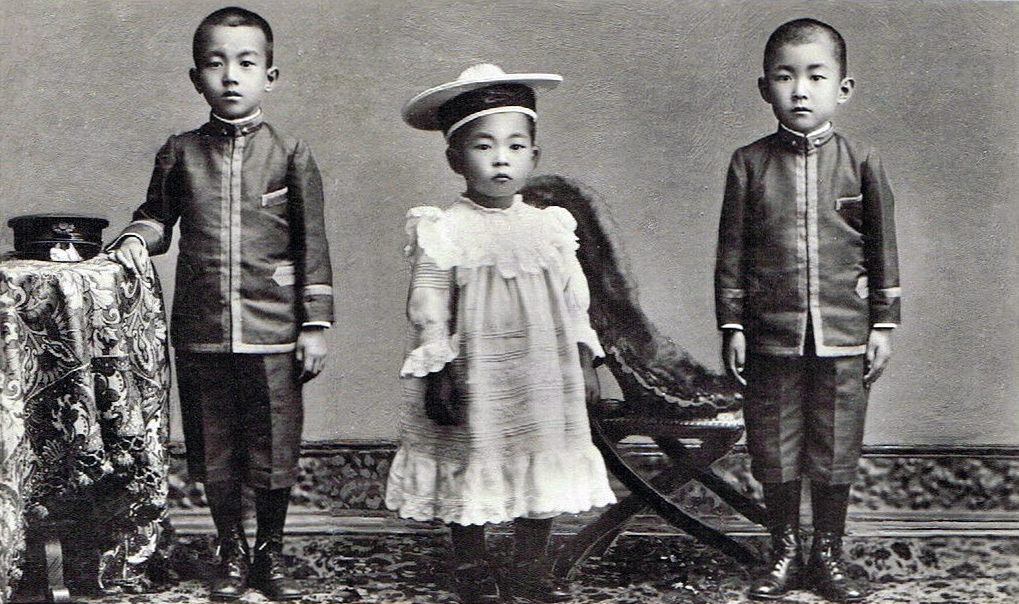
Hirohito, Nobuhito and Yasuhito in 1906

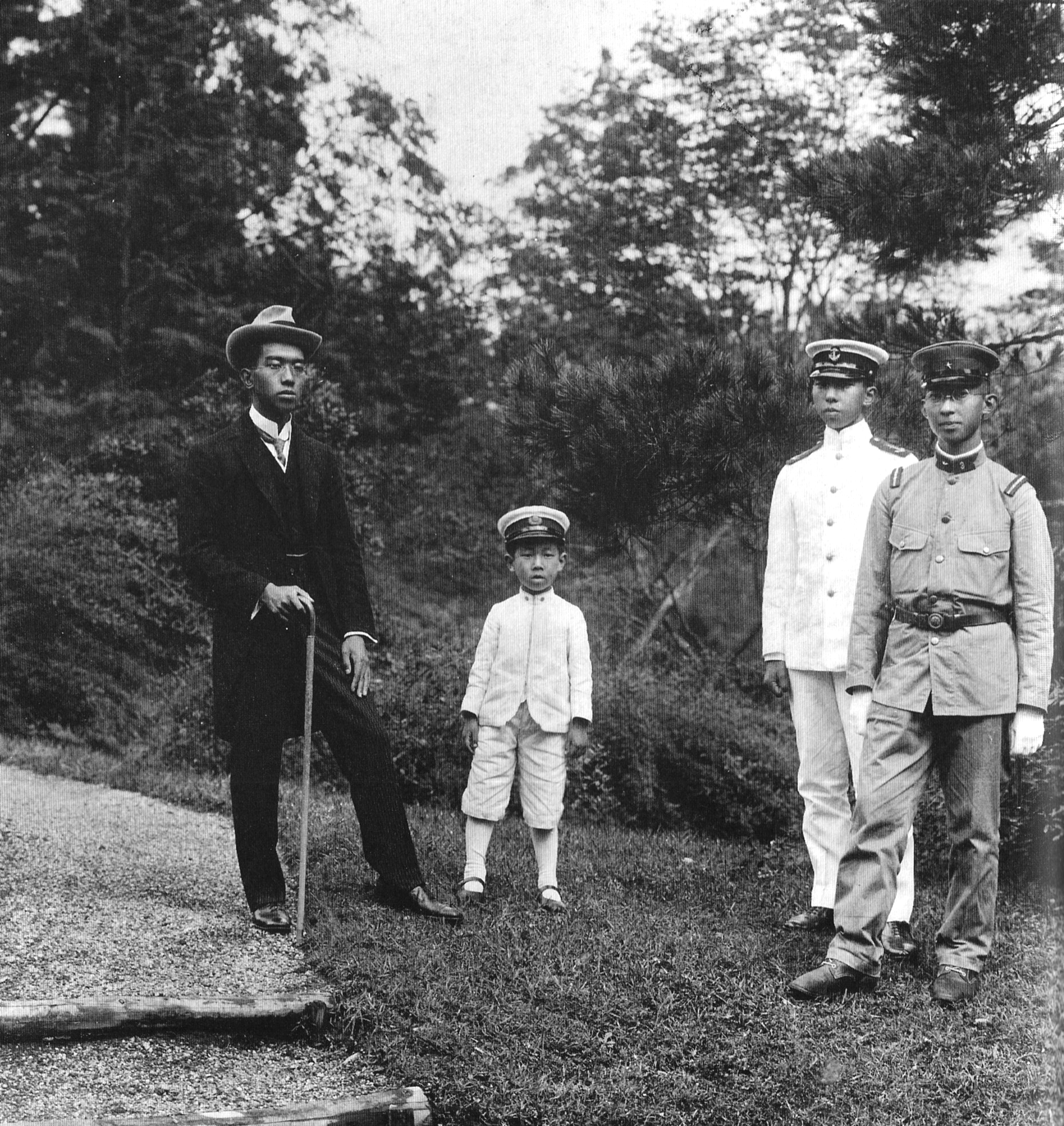
Emperor Taishō's four sons in 1921: Hirohito, Takahito, Nobuhito and Yasuhito

Nobuhito was born at the Aoyama Palace in Tokyo to then-Crown Prince Yoshihito and Crown Princess Sadako. His childhood appellation was Teru-no-miya (Prince Teru). Like his elder brothers, Prince Hirohito and Prince Yasuhito, he attended the boy's elementary and secondary departments of the Peers' School (Gakushuin). When Prince Arisugawa Takehito (1862–1913), the tenth head of the collateral imperial house of Arisugawa-no-miya, died without a male heir, Emperor Taishō placed Prince Nobuhito in the house. The name of the house reverted to the original Takamatsu-no-miya. The new Prince Takamatsu was a fourth cousin, four times removed of Prince Takehito.

== Military service ==
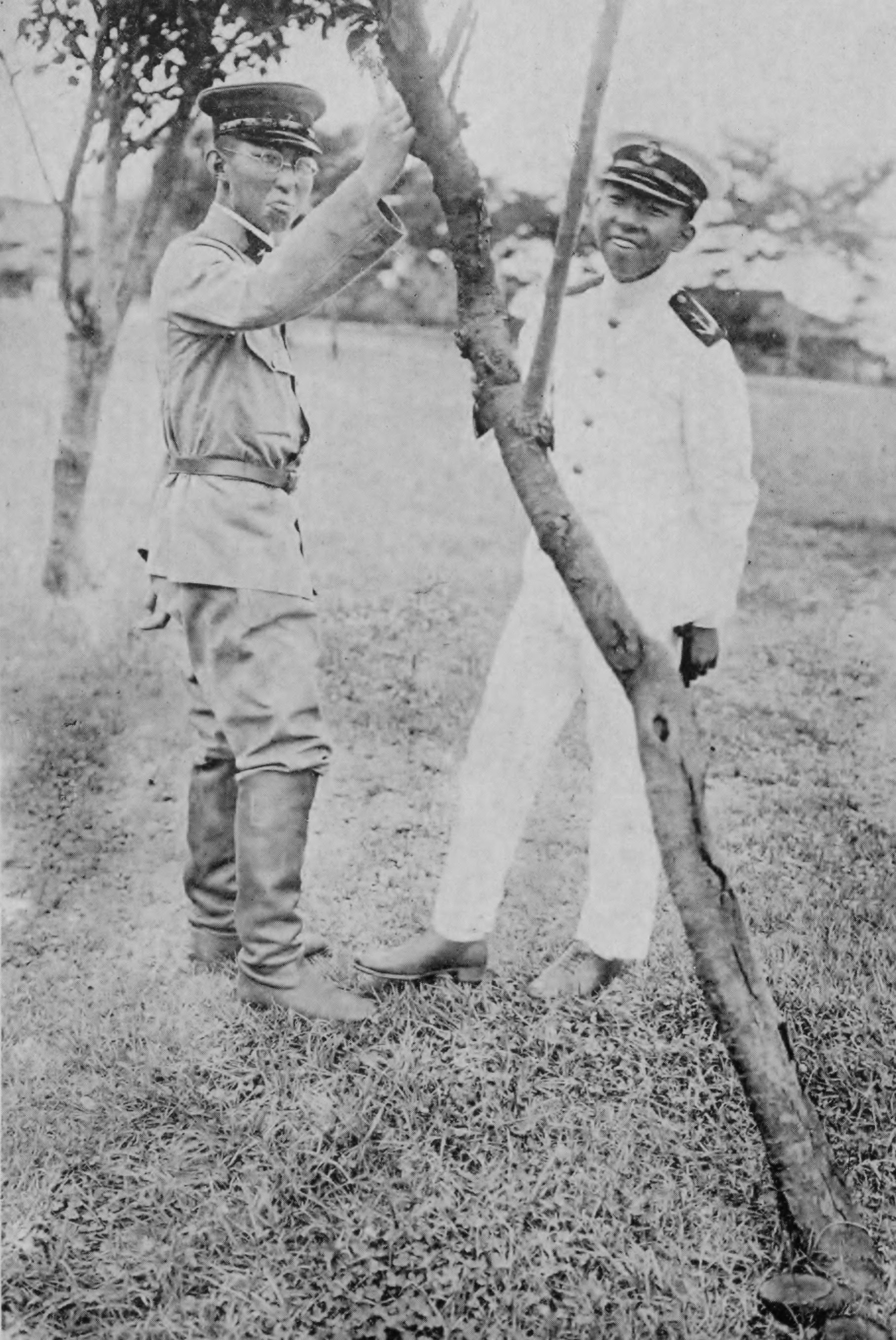
Prince Yasuhito and Nobuhito in 1922

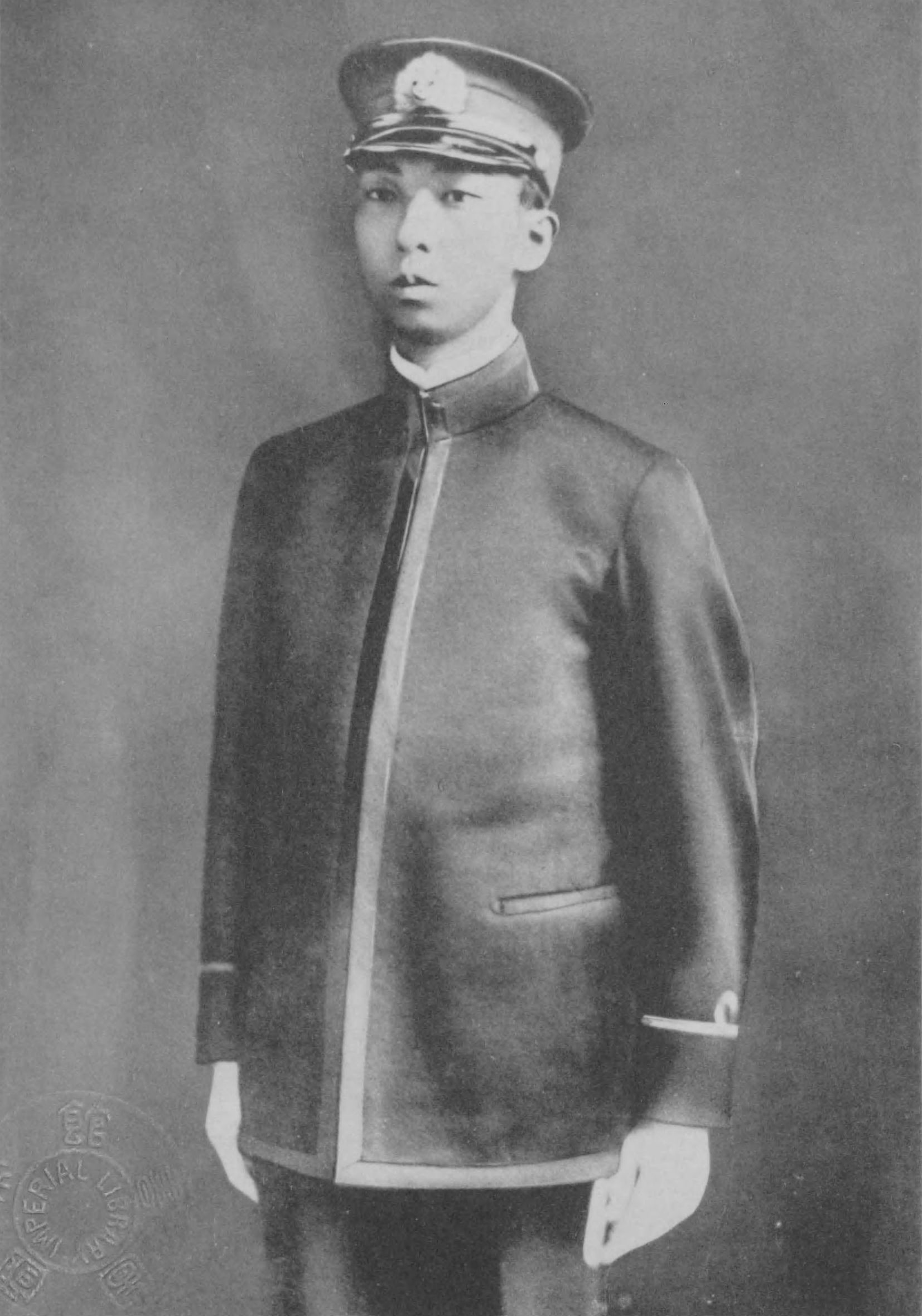
Prince Nobuhito was commissioned as a naval sub-lieutenant (1920s)

Prince Takamatsu attended the Imperial Japanese Naval Academy from 1922 to 1924. He received a commission as an ensign on 1 December 1925 and took up duties aboard the battleship Fusō. He was promoted to sub-lieutenant the following year after completing the course of study at the Torpedo School. The prince studied at the Naval Aviation School at Kasumigaura in 1927 and the Naval Gunnery School at Yokosuka in 1930–1931. In 1930, he was promoted to lieutenant and attached to the Imperial Japanese Navy General Staff in Tokyo. He became a squadron commander of cruiser Takao, two years later and subsequently was reassigned to the Fusō. Prince Takamatsu graduated from the Naval Staff College in 1936, after having been promoted to lieutenant commander on 15 November 1935. He was promoted to the rank of commander on 15 November 1940 and finally to captain on 1 November 1942. From 1936 to 1945, he held various staff positions in the Naval General Staff Office in Tokyo.

== Marriage ==
On 4 February 1930, Prince Takamatsu married Kikuko Tokugawa (1911–2004), the second daughter of Yoshihisa Tokugawa. The bride was a granddaughter of Yoshinobu Tokugawa, the last shōgun of the Tokugawa shogunate, and a granddaughter of the late Prince Takehito Arisugawa. Shortly after the wedding, Prince and Princess Takamatsu embarked upon a world tour to Europe and then across the United States so as to strengthen the goodwill and understanding between Japan and those nations. Prince Iesato Tokugawa was the uncle of Prince and Princess Takamatsu. Prince Tokugawa allied with Prince and Princess Takamatsu on many international goodwill projects.

Prince and Princess Takamatsu had no children.

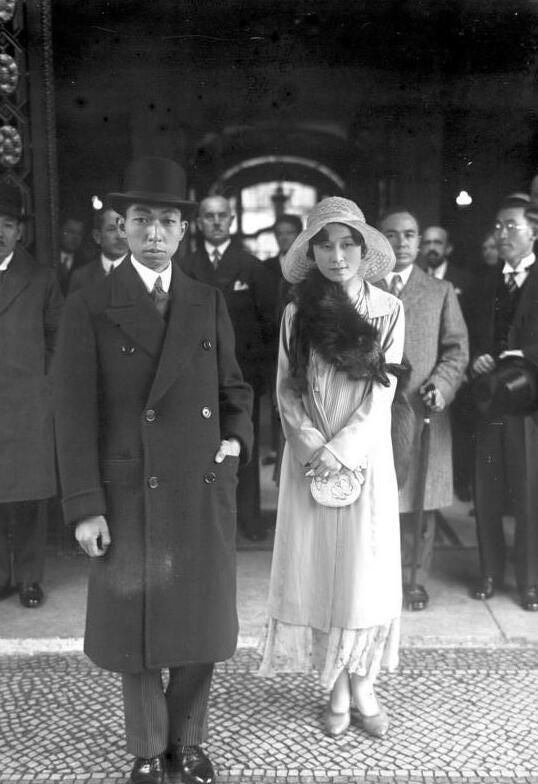
1930: Prince and Princess Takamatsu visit Berlin, Germany during their World Tour

== Second World War ==
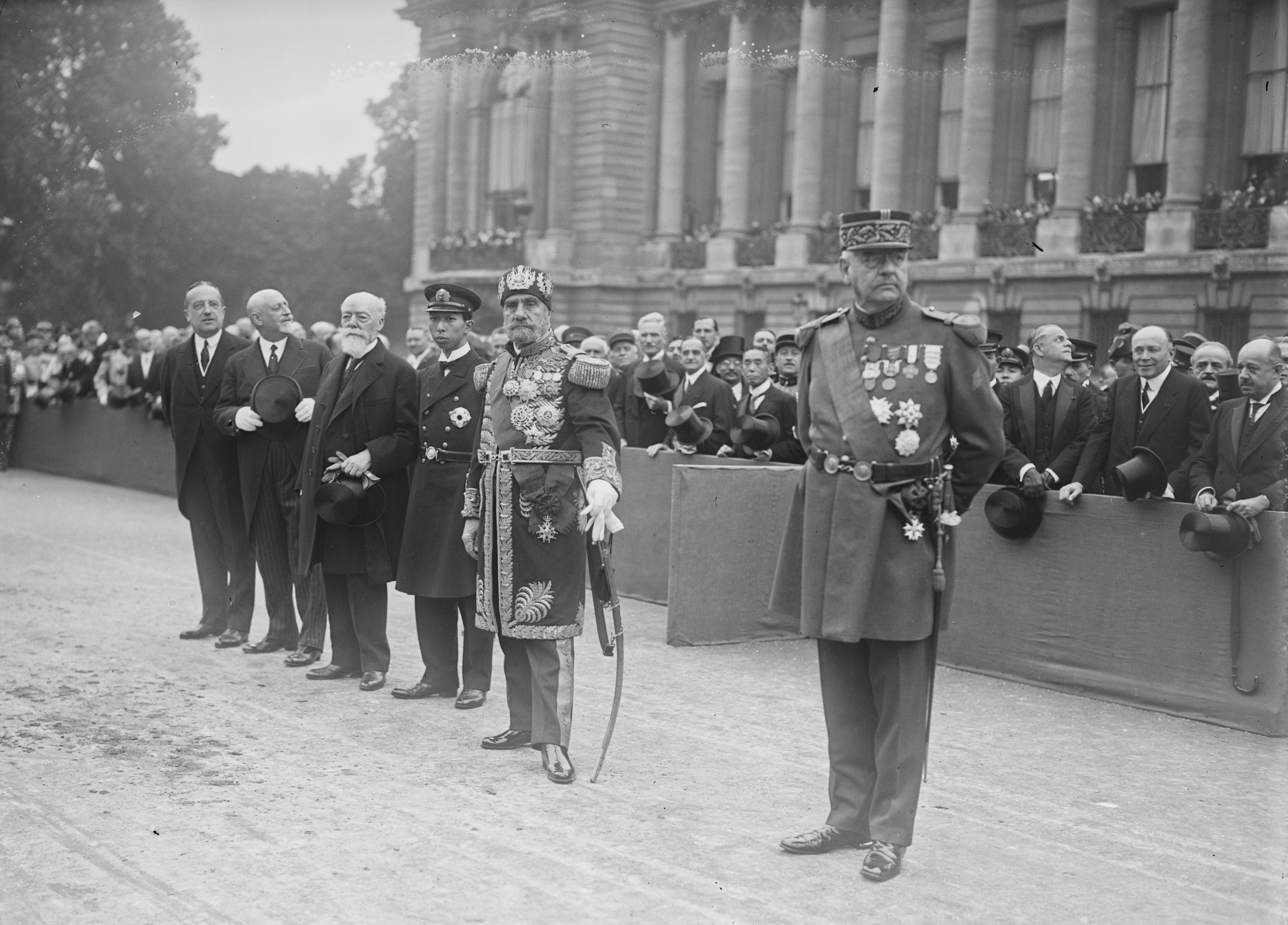
Nobuhito (third from the right) inspected the French military parade on the Avenue Alexandre III in Paris, together with Prince Louis II of Monaco and French President Gaston Doumergue (14 July 1930).

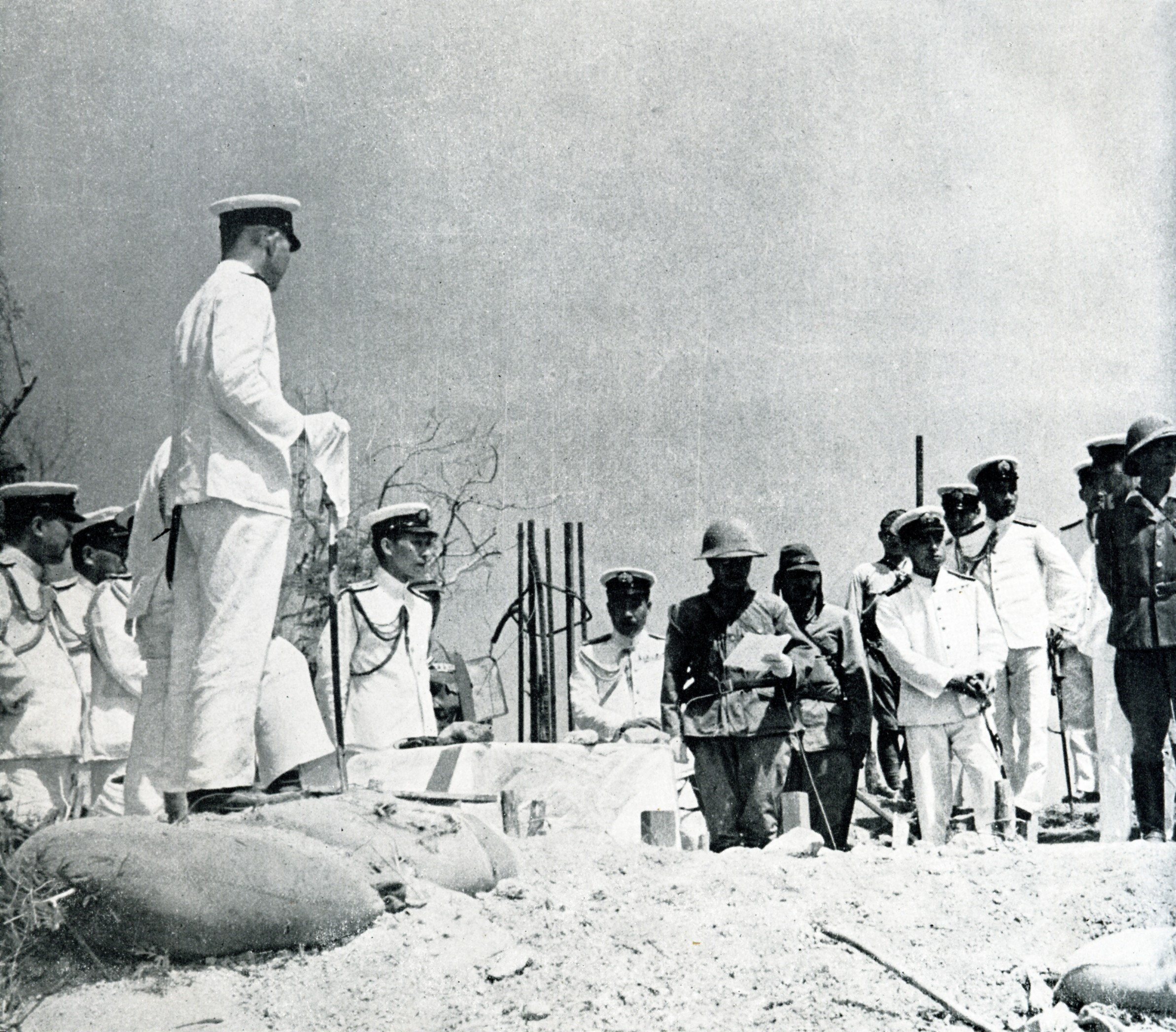
Nobuhito (naval officer standing behind the white table) in the Philippines during the Pacific War (1 June 1943).

From the 1930s, Prince Takamatsu expressed grave reservations regarding Japanese aggression in Manchuria and the decision to wage war on the United States.

After the Battle of Saipan in July 1944, Prince Takamatsu joined his mother Empress Teimei, his uncles Prince Naruhiko Higashikuni and Prince Yasuhiko Asaka, former prime minister Konoe Fumimaro, and other aristocrats, in seeking the ouster of the prime minister Hideki Tojo.

== After the surrender ==
After the surrender of Japan, Prince Takamatsu entertained many American officers at his residence during their occupation of Japan. His role in the post-war years was largely ceremonial and he became the honorary president of various charitable, cultural and athletic organizations including the Japan Fine Arts Society, the Denmark-Japan Society, the France-Japan Society, the Tofu Society for the Welfare of Leprosy Patients, the Sericulture Association, the Japan Basketball Association, and the Saise Welfare Society. He also served as a patron of the Japanese Red Cross Society (present-day honorary president is Empress Masako) and was a major contributor of the NBTHK (Nihon Bijutsu Token Hozon Kyokai or Society for the Preservation of the Japanese Sword). He also officiated the Honorary President of the Preparatory Committee for founding International Christian University (ICU) located in Mitaka, Tokyo.

Known for his outgoing nature, Nobuhito was said to have "slipped away from his guards and walk freely" before the war and "frequently came without any escort to drinking places in Ginza" after the war. In 1970, Prince Takamatsu became the first member of the imperial family to visit South Korea after Japan's colonial rule over Korea ended in 1945. He garnered criticism in 1973 when it was announced that he would privately visit vessels of the Maritime Self-Defense Force. The engagement was canceled due to the backlash.

In 1975, the Bungei Shunjū literary magazine published a long interview with Takamatsu in which he told of the warning he made to his brother Hirohito after the Battle of Midway when he realized Japan's defeat was inevitable; "I said, we now have to think about how to end the war. I expressed this left and right".

Prince Takamatsu died of lung cancer on 3 February 1987, at the Japanese Red Cross Medical Center (ja, located in Shibuya, Tokyo). He had been diagnosed with the disease in July 1986. His remains were buried at Toshimagaoka Cemetery located in Bunkyō, Tokyo.

== Diary ==
In 1991 the prince's wife Kikuko, Princess Takamatsu and an aide discovered a twenty-volume diary, written in Prince Takamatsu's own hand between 1921 and 1947. Despite opposition from the entrenched bureaucrats of the Imperial Household Agency, she gave the diary to the magazine Chūōkōron, which published excerpts in 1995. The diary in full was published from 1995 to 1997, in eight volumes.

The diary revealed that Prince Takamatsu bitterly opposed the Kwantung Army's incursions in Manchuria in September 1931, the expansion of the July 1937 Marco Polo Bridge Incident into the Second Sino-Japanese War and in November 1941 warned his brother, Hirohito, that the Imperial Japanese Navy could not sustain hostilities for longer than two years against the United States. He urged his eldest brother, Emperor Shōwa to seek peace after the Japanese naval defeat at the Battle of Midway in 1942; an intervention which apparently caused a severe rift between the brothers.

== Honours ==
=== National honours ===
- Grand Cordon of the Order of the Chrysanthemum (1 February 1925)
- Grand Cordon of the Order of the Rising Sun
- Grand Cordon of the Order of the Sacred Treasure
- Order of the Golden Kite, Fourth Class (29 April 1940)
- China Incident Medal (29 April 1940)

=== Foreign honours ===
- Belgium: Grand Cordon Order of Leopold (1930)
- Sweden: Knight of the Royal Order of the Seraphim (1930)
- Italy: Knight of the Order of the Most Holy Annunciation
- Spain: Collar of the Order of Charles III (1930)
- United Kingdom: Recipient of the Royal Victorian Chain, conferred in 1930, revoked in 1942.
- Portugal: Grand Cross of the Order of the Tower and Sword (1930)
- Czechoslovakia: Grand Cross of the Order of the White Lion (1931)

== Ancestry ==
Ancestors of Nobuhito, Prince Takamatsu

8. Osahito, Emperor Kōmei
4. Mutsuhito, Emperor Meiji
9. Lady Yoshiko Nakayama
2. Yoshihito, Emperor Taishō
10. Count Takamitsu Yanagihara
5. Lady Naruko Yanagiwara
11. Lady Utano Hasegawa
1. Nobuhito, Prince Takamatsu
12. Prince Kujō Hisatada, Regent
6. Prince Kujō Michitaka of the Fujiwara Clan
13. Lady Karahashi Meiko
3. Lady Sadako Kujō
14. Noma Yorioki
7. Lady Noma Ikuko
15. Lady Yamokushi Kairi

=== Patrilineal descent ===
Patrilineal descent

Imperial House of Japan

1. Descent prior to Keitai is unclear to modern historians, but traditionally traced back patrilineally to Emperor Jimmu
2. Emperor Keitai, ca. 450–534
3. Emperor Kinmei, 509–571
4. Emperor Bidatsu, 538–585
5. Prince Oshisaka, ca. 556–???
6. Emperor Jomei, 593–641
7. Emperor Tenji, 626–671
8. Prince Shiki, ???–716
9. Emperor Kōnin, 709–786
10. Emperor Kanmu, 737–806
11. Emperor Saga, 786–842
12. Emperor Ninmyō, 810–850
13. Emperor Kōkō, 830–867
14. Emperor Uda, 867–931
15. Emperor Daigo, 885–930
16. Emperor Murakami, 926–967
17. Emperor En'yū, 959–991
18. Emperor Ichijō, 980–1011
19. Emperor Go-Suzaku, 1009–1045
20. Emperor Go-Sanjō, 1034–1073
21. Emperor Shirakawa, 1053–1129
22. Emperor Horikawa, 1079–1107
23. Emperor Toba, 1103–1156
24. Emperor Go-Shirakawa, 1127–1192
25. Emperor Takakura, 1161–1181
26. Emperor Go-Toba, 1180–1239
27. Emperor Tsuchimikado, 1196–1231
28. Emperor Go-Saga, 1220–1272
29. Emperor Go-Fukakusa, 1243–1304
30. Emperor Fushimi, 1265–1317
31. Emperor Go-Fushimi, 1288–1336
32. Emperor Kōgon, 1313–1364
33. Emperor Sukō, 1334–1398
34. Prince Yoshihito Fushimi, 1351–1416
35. Prince Sadafusa Fushimi, 1372–1456
36. Emperor Go-Hanazono, 1419–1471
37. Emperor Go-Tsuchimikado, 1442–1500
38. Emperor Go-Kashiwabara, 1464–1526
39. Emperor Go-Nara, 1495–1557
40. Emperor Ōgimachi, 1517–1593
41. Prince Masahito, 1552–1586
42. Emperor Go-Yōzei, 1572–1617
43. Emperor Go-Mizunoo, 1596–1680
44. Emperor Reigen, 1654–1732
45. Emperor Higashiyama, 1675–1710
46. Prince Naohito Kanin, 1704–1753
47. Prince Sukehito Kanin, 1733–1794
48. Emperor Kōkaku, 1771–1840
49. Emperor Ninkō, 1800–1846
50. Emperor Kōmei, 1831–1867
51. Emperor Meiji, 1852–1912
52. Emperor Taishō, 1879–1926
53. Nobuhito, Prince Takamatsu

== See also ==
- Praemium Imperiale is an arts prize awarded since 1989 in the memory of Prince Takamatsu

== Bibliography ==
- Hideaki Kase, Takamatsu no miya kaku katariki, Bungei shunjû, February 1975, pp. 193, 198, 200
