= Prince Kan'in Naruhito =

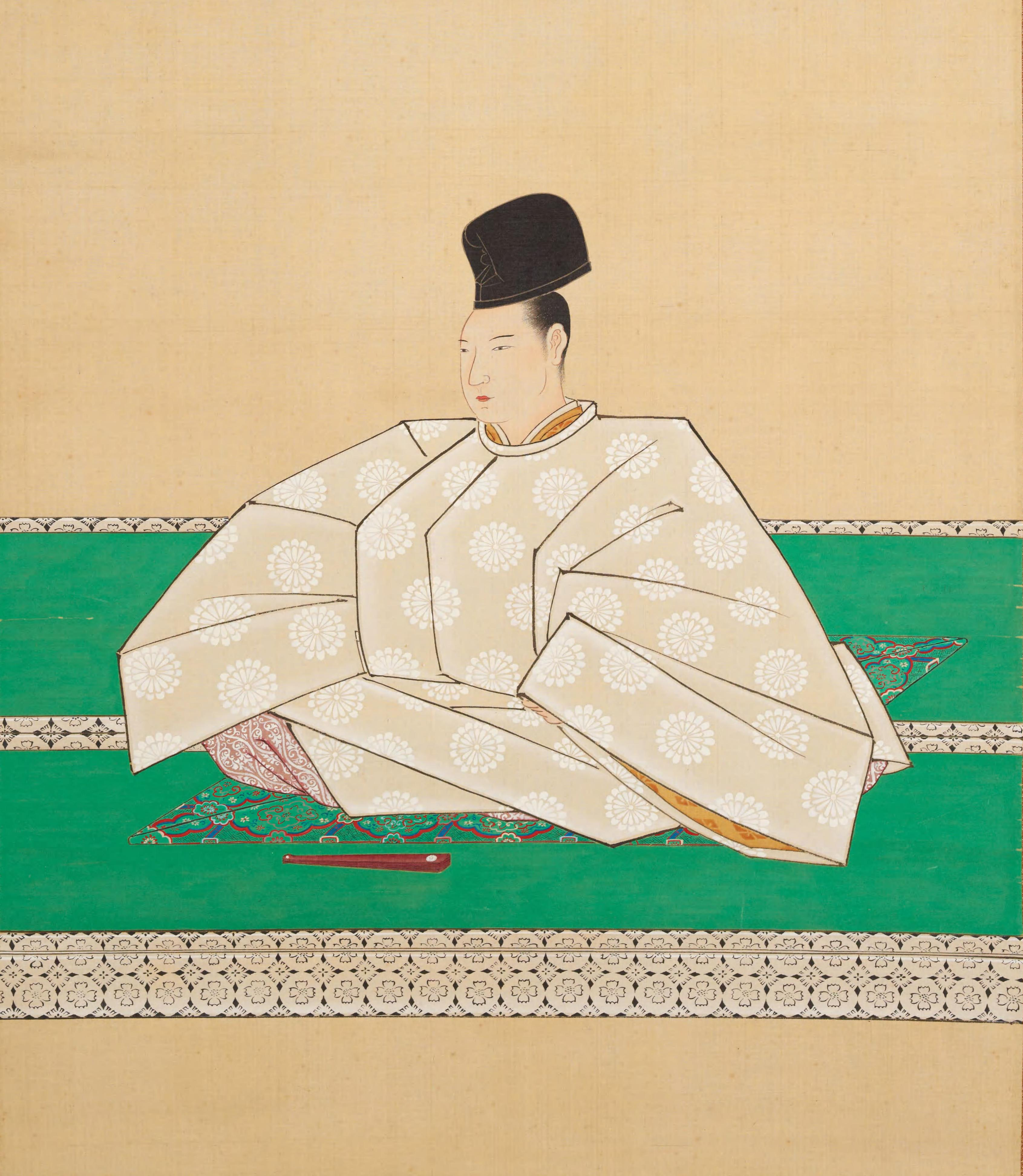

Prince Kan'in
- Reign: 1824–1824
- Predecessor: Prince Kan'in Tatsuhito
- Successor: Prince Kan'in Kotohito
- Born: February 17, 1818
- Died: October 20, 1842 (aged 24)
- Father: Prince Kan'in Tatsuhito

Prince Kan'in Naruhito (閑院宮 愛仁親王, Kan'in-no-miya Naruhito-ō; February 17, 1818 – October 20, 1842) was the 5th head of the Kan'in-no-miya line of shinnōke cadet branches of the Imperial Family of Japan.

He became the 5th head in 1828 after the passing of Prince Kan'in Tatsuhito.

Because the prince had no heirs, the title of Prince Kan'in lay dormant with his death. The 6th prince was Prince Kan'in Kotohito, who was selected in 1872 from the branch Fushimi-no-miya.
