= Ōe Iwashiro =

Born 1744-1813 birth mother of Emperor Kōkaku, great-great grandmother of Emperor Meiji

- 大江磐代
- Born: 1744; Kurayoshi, Hōki Province
- Died: 11 January 1813 (aged 68–69)
- Burial place: Rozan-ji
- Other name: Renjō'in (蓮上院)
- Partner: Sukehito, Prince Kan'in
- Children: Emperor Kōkaku
- Father: Iwamuro Muneyoshi
- Family: Ōe Clan

Ōe Iwashiro (大江磐代) (1744 – January 11, 1813) was the favoured concubine of Sukehito, Prince Kan'in. She was the birth mother of Emperor Kōkaku and the great-great grandmother of Emperor Meiji. Her imperial name was Ren Senpaku.

== Life ==
She was born in 1744 in Kurayoshi, Hōki Province (now Minatomachi, Kurayoshi City, Tottori Prefecture) to father Iwamuro Muneken, a vassal of the Arao clan, a retainer of the Tottori domain, and a mother who was a daughter of an iron wholesaler.

At the age of 9, she moved to Kyoto with her father, who had become a Rōnin and a town doctor. She was adopted and served in the Kushige clan, and by the time she was in her teens, she took the surname Tachibana.

Later, when she married Sukehito, Prince Kan'in, she changed her name to Iwashiro and became the prince's wife. She gave birth to three sons. Her eldest son, Prince Morohito, took Princess Yoshiko, the only child of Emperor Go-Momozono, who had no sons, as his empress, by recommendation of his adopted mother, Empress Go-Sakuramachi.

After the death of her husband, she became a monk, took the name Renjoin.

She died in 1813 and was buried at Rozan-ji. In 1878, she was posthumously awarded the rank of Shoshii one of the highest ranks of Shinkao, and in 1902, the rank of Juichii.
