= Prince Arisugawa Takehito =

Japanese prince and admiral (1862–1913)

His Imperial Highness Takehito Prince Arisugawa
- 有栖川宮威仁親王
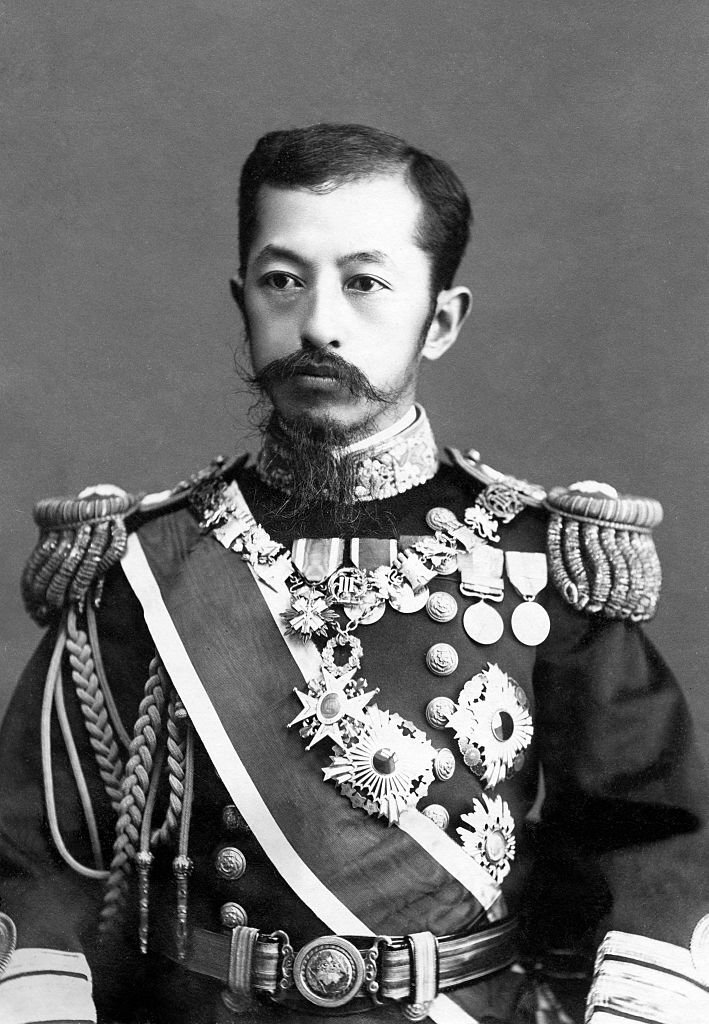
- Born: January 13, 1862; Kyoto, Japan
- Died: July 5, 1913 (aged 51); Kobe, Japan (actual); Tokyo, Japan (official)
- Relatives: Prince Arisugawa Takahito (father); Noriko Mori (mother)
- Military career
- Allegiance: Empire of Japan
- Branch: Imperial Japanese Navy
- Service years: 1874–1913
- Rank: Marshal Admiral
- Conflicts: First Sino-Japanese War; Russo-Japanese War
- Awards: Knight Grand Cross of the Most Honourable Order of the Bath; Order of the Golden Kite (3rd Class); Collar of the Supreme Order of the Chrysanthemum.

Prince Arisugawa Takehito (有栖川宮威仁親王, Arisugawa-no-miya Takehito-Shinnō; January 13, 1862 – July 5, 1913) was the 10th head of a cadet branch of the Japanese imperial family and a career officer in the Imperial Japanese Navy.

== Early life ==
Prince Takehito was born in Kyoto as a scion of the Arisugawa-no-miya (有栖川宮家) house, one of the shinnōke branches of the Imperial Family of Japan, which were eligible to succeed to the Chrysanthemum Throne in the event that the main line should die out. Prince Takehito is born to Prince Arisugawa Takahito and Noriko Mori; a concubine. As he was born when the country was still under rule by the Tokugawa Bakufu, he was sent as a youth into the Buddhist priesthood, and assigned to serve at the monzeki temple of Myōhō-in in Kyoto. After the Meiji Restoration, he was recalled to secular life, and relocated to Tokyo in 1871.

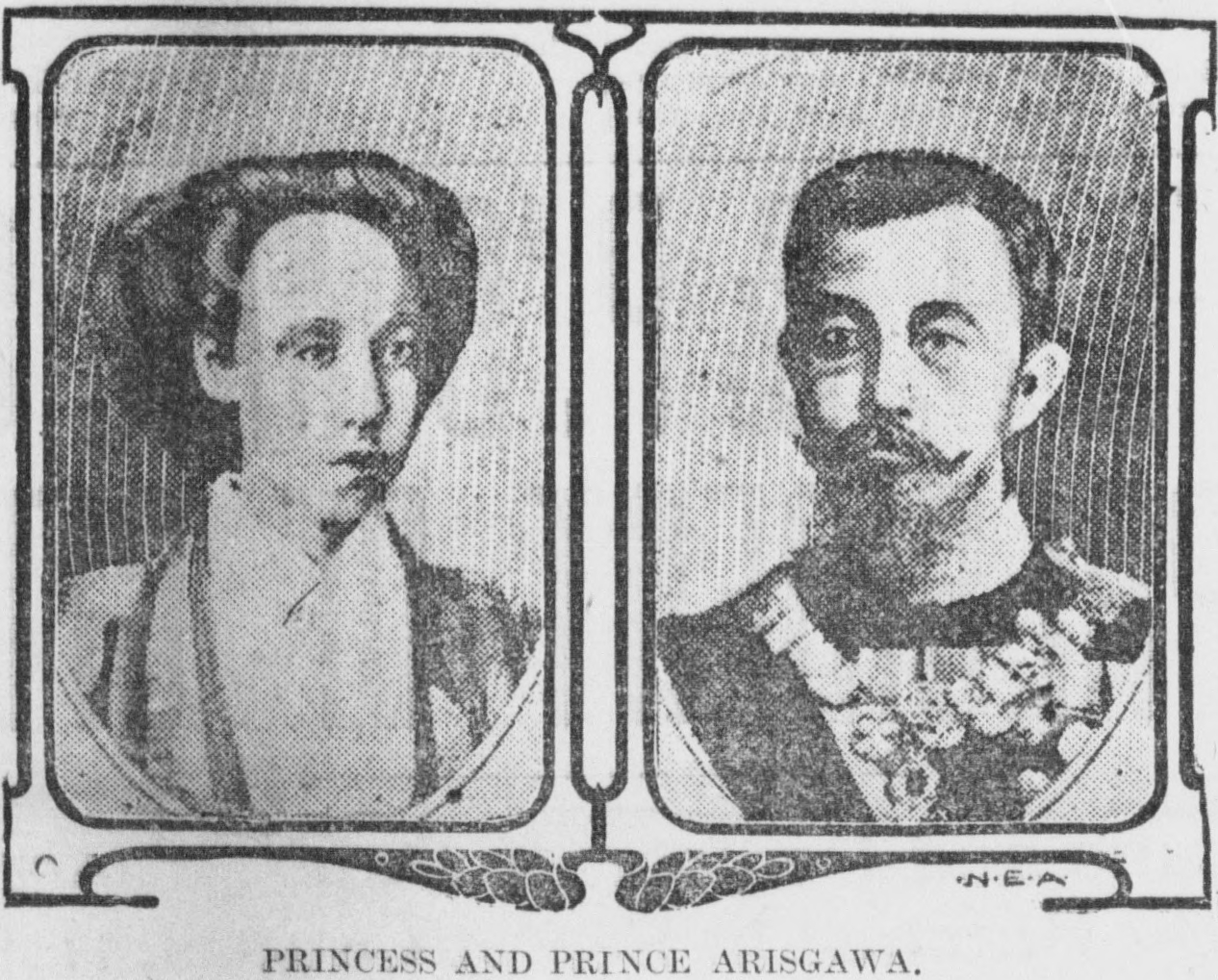
Arisugawa Takehito and Maeda Yasuko

== Naval and diplomatic career ==
In 1874, on orders from Emperor Meiji, Arisugawa enrolled in the Imperial Japanese Naval Academy. In 1877, despite his youth, he was sent as an observer to the Satsuma Rebellion, to observe the devastation first hand, and landed in Kagoshima shortly after it was secured by Imperial forces.

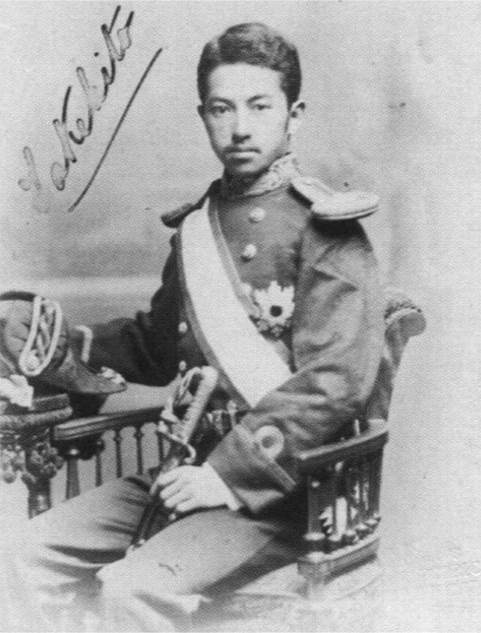
Prince Arisugawa Takehito as a navy officer

In 1879, Arisugawa was sent as a military attaché to Great Britain and embarked upon HMS Iron Duke, the flagship of Britain's Royal Navy in the Far East, for further training. He served in the Channel Squadron for a year before returning to Japan as an ensign.

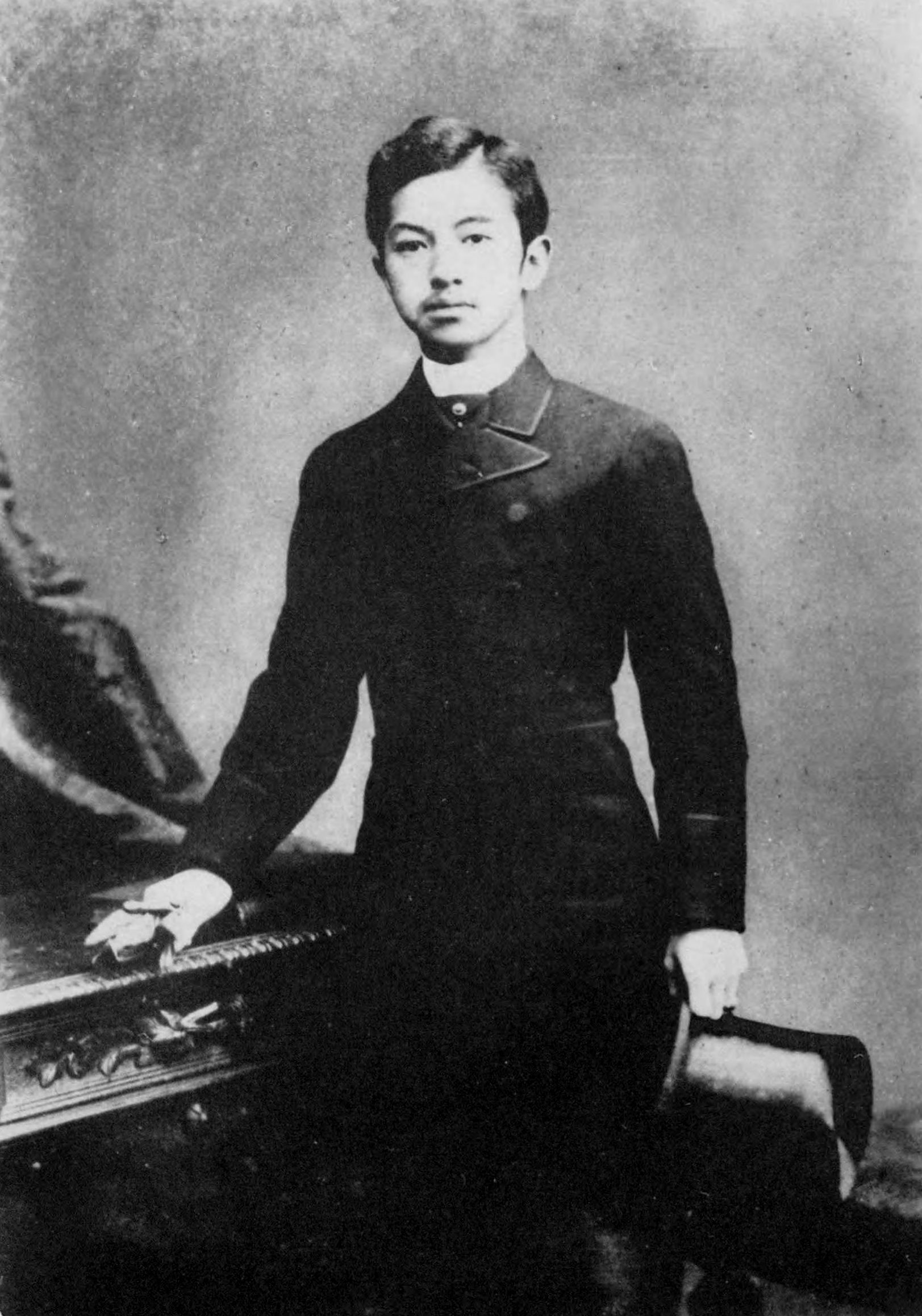
Prince Arisugawa Takehito during his studies in England

In 1880, shortly after his wedding, Arisugawa was again sent to England, this time as a cadet at the Royal Naval College, Greenwich. He returned to Japan in June 1883. Arisugawa and Maeda Yasuko, his wife made an extensive tour of Europe and America in 1889.

Arisugawa's first naval command was that of the corvette Katsuragi in early 1890, and his next was the cruiser Takao later that year.

In 1891, Arisugawa was assigned to escort Russian Crown Prince Nikolai, later Tsar Nicholas II, during his tour of Japan; his prior experience studying in England was the stated reason for the appointment. On 11 May, the party was returning by rickshaw from an outing around Lake Biwa. Nikolai was riding immediately ahead of Prince George of Greece, with Arisugawa following behind them, when a guard escorting the group drew his sword and attacked Nikolai. This event became known as the Ōtsu incident. Arisugawa requested that Emperor Meiji personally visit and console the wounded prince; the visit is one of the events historians point to in explaining why the incident did not produce a larger deterioration in relations with Russia.

Arisugawa also served for a number of years as tutor and guide to Crown Prince Yoshihito, the future Emperor Taishō, accompanying him on his travels and attending to his day-to-day instruction. Around 1903, his declining health led Emperor Meiji to relieve him of this duty.

In 1892, Arisugawa was posted as captain of the cruiser Chiyoda. He succeeded to the Arisugawa-no-miya title upon the death of his half-brother, Prince Arisugawa Taruhito, on January 15, 1895.

During the First Sino-Japanese War (1894–95), Arisugawa commanded the cruiser Matsushima and subsequently the cruiser Hashidate in combat. He attained the rank of rear admiral on November 11, 1896. In 1896, he travelled to England again to represent Emperor Meiji at the Diamond Jubilee celebrations for Queen Victoria.

Arisugawa advanced to the rank of vice admiral on September 26, 1899.

King Edward VII appointed Arisugawa an Honorary Knight Grand Cross in the civil division of the Most Honourable Order of the Bath (GCB) in the November 1902 Birthday Honours list published on the British King′s birthday.

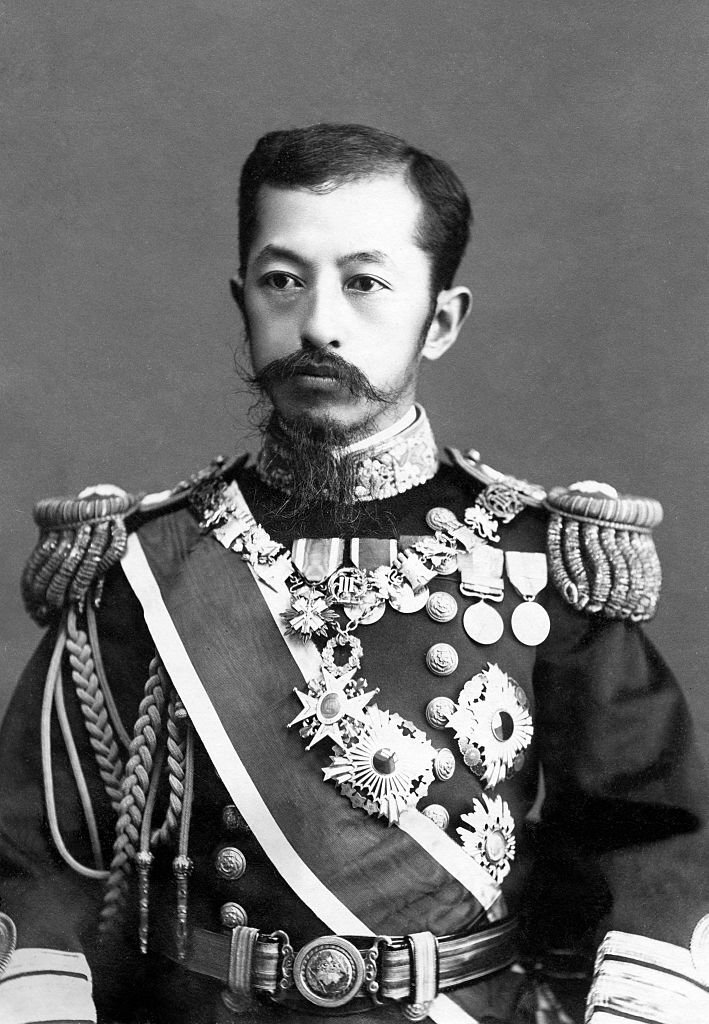
Admiral Prince Arisugawa Takehito in 1905

Arisugawa was promoted to full admiral on June 28, 1904, the first member of the imperial family to reach that rank and only the sixth person in Japan to hold it. Following the fall of Port Arthur in January 1905 he was made a military councillor, formally advising the Emperor. He was abroad when the decisive Battle of Tsushima was fought in May 1905, having travelled with his wife to represent the Emperor at the wedding of the German Crown Prince Wilhelm (1882–1951) to Duchess Cecile of Mecklenburg-Schwerin. Meiji appointed the prince a member of the Order of the Golden Kite (3rd Class) for his service during the Russo-Japanese War. He and his wife visited Great Britain again on their way back to Japan.

== Final years ==
Arisugawa had a weak constitution from childhood and took frequent medical leaves during his naval career. He built a summer home in Kobe and went into semi-retirement in 1909 to recuperate from tuberculosis. He died there on July 5, 1913. News of his death was not made public immediately; his body was taken back to his palace in Kōjimachi, Tokyo by a specially chartered train, and his death was formally announced on July 10, 1913.

He was advanced to the honorary rank of marshal admiral on July 7, 1913. This came after his actual death but before his official death date, so the promotion was not treated as posthumous. He was, however, awarded the Collar of the Supreme Order of the Chrysanthemum posthumously.

== Marriage and family ==
On December 11, 1880, Arisugawa married Maeda Yasuko (March 15, 1864 – June 30, 1923), the fourth daughter of Maeda Yoshiyasu, the last daimyō of Kaga Domain (modern Ishikawa prefecture), by whom he had three children.

- Princess Isako (績子女王; October 17, 1885, - September 30, 1886)
- Prince Arisugawa Tanehito (有栖川宮栽仁王; September 22, 1887 – April 7, 1908)
- Princess Mieko (實枝子女王; February 14, 1891 – April 25, 1933); married Prince Tokugawa Yoshihisa; their daughter was Kikuko, Princess Takamatsu.

Since the prince died without a male heir (his son, Tanehito, having died of appendicitis in 1908 while attending the Imperial Japanese Naval Academy at Etajima, Hiroshima), the direct line of descent of the house of Arisugawa-no-miya became extinct.

However, his boyhood friend Prince Yoshihito, Emperor Taishō, revived the house (which reverted to its original name of Takamatsu-no-miya) in favor of his third son, Prince Takamatsu Nobuhito. Prince Nobuhito subsequently married Kikuko Tokugawa, a granddaughter of Prince Arisugawa Takehito.

== Memorials ==
- The site of Arisugawa's Tokyo palace is now the Arisugawa-no-miya Memorial Park. It is located in Minami Azabu, Minato, Tokyo and its extensive gardens are open to the public. The site of his seaside summer home in Hayama, Kanagawa Prefecture is now the site of the annex of the Kanagawa Prefectural Museum of Modern Art
- Arisugawa's summer villa in Inawashiro, Fukushima, the Tenkyōkaku (which he personally designed) is an Important Cultural Properties of Japan and is open to the public as a museum. On the grounds is a large standing bronze statue of Prince Arisugawa, formerly located at the Naval Staff College in Tsukiji, Tokyo.
