= Rozan-ji =

Tendai Buddhist temple in Kyoto, Japan

- 廬山寺
- The zen garden at Rozan-ji

- Location within Kyoto city

Religion
- Affiliation: Tendai Buddhism, Enjo sect

Location
- Coordinates: 35°01′24″N 135°45′50″E

Architecture
- Founder: Ryōgen
- Completed: 938

Rozan-ji (Japanese: 廬山寺, or Rozan Tendaikoji) is a Tendai Buddhist temple in Kamigyō-ku, Kyoto, and the head temple (honzan) of the Enjo (圓浄) sect. The sangō (literally, mountain name) of Rozan-ji is Mount Lu, or Lushan, pronounced rozan in Japanese. Currently located on the eastern side of the Kyoto Imperial Palace, it was founded by Ryōgen, the abbot of Enryaku-ji, in 938 in the Funaokayama neighborhood, south of Daitoku-ji. It was one of four temples that had an okurodo (御黒戸), a private Buddhist chapel for the Imperial Family, originally located in the Imperial Palace. These temples, the others being Nison-in, Hanjū-in, and Kengō-in, belong directly to the Imperial Household. The temple was protected from destruction by a nyōbō hosho, an official document recording the orders and words of the emperor written by the female court member, Madenokoji Fusako, during Oda Nobunaga assault on Kyoto temples, specifically the Tendai branch, and the siege of Mount Hiei. In 1573 it was moved to its present location on Teramachi Street as part of Toyotomi Hideyoshi's reorganization of Kyoto. The reconstruction was completed under the directive of Emperor Kōkaku.

The reconstructed temple was devastated in the Kyoto fire in 1708 (Hōei 5) and again in 1788 (Tenmei 8) during the Great Fire of Kyoto. The present structure was rebuilt in 1794 (Kansei 6) from a portion of the Sentō Imperial Palace.

The rock garden of the temple is known as the Genji Garden (源氏庭), after the titular character in The Tale of Genji, and is noted for its Japanese bellflowers.

== Importance ==
Rozan-ji's temple grounds built on the former mansion of Fujiwara no Kanesuke, the great-grandfather of Murasaki Shikibu, and is notable as the place where she was born, raised, married, and gave birth to her daughter. Murasaki's residence in Rozan-ji was confirmed and identified in 1965 by the Japanese historian Tsunoda Bun'ei [ja], and Rozan-ji has since become popular with Genji enthusiasts, although nothing of the villa remains and the present site is not where the mansion originally stood.

There are a number of imperial and other important mausoleums on the temple grounds, including the sculptor Jōchō and both Emperor Kōkaku's parents, such as his father posthumously recognized as Emperor Kyōkō, and his birth mother Ōe Iwashiro. One of the National Treasures of Japan, the testament of Ryōgen to his pupil Jinzen, from 972, is held at Rozan-ji.

== Festivals ==
Rozan-ji is known for its Setsubun festivities, particularly the oni-odori, or demon dance, more formally known as tsuinashiki oni hōraku (追儺式鬼法楽), demon exorcising ritual celebration. The ceremony begins on the afternoon of Setsubun with red, green, and black oni representing the three poisons of Buddhism (greed, hatred, and ignorance) dancing on a stage with taiko and horagai playing. They then interfere with the prayers of the audience but are ultimately defeated by the priests' goma ritual and the tsuinashi, the priest conducting the exorcisms.

There is also a demon healing ceremony, where audience members tell the now white demon, which has been exorcised, which parts of their bodies need healing. The demon then lays a sacred sword on the person's shoulder and prays for them to be healed.
