= Prince Kan'in Haruhito =

Japanese prince and army officer (1902–1988)

HIH Prince Prince Kan'in Haruhito
- 閑院宮春仁王
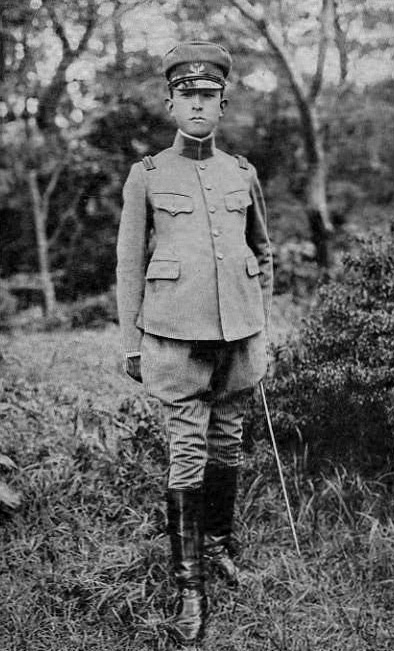
- Born: 3 August 1902; Nagatachō, Tokyo, Japan
- Died: 18 June 1988 (aged 85); Odawara, Kanagawa, Japan
- Military career
- Allegiance: Empire of Japan
- Branch: Imperial Japanese Army
- Service years: 1924–1945
- Rank: Major General
- Commands: Imperial Japanese Army
- Conflicts: Second Sino-Japanese War; World War II
- Awards: Supreme Order of the Chrysanthemum; Order of the Rising Sun with Paulownia Flowers, 1st Class; Order of the Golden Kite, 4th Class

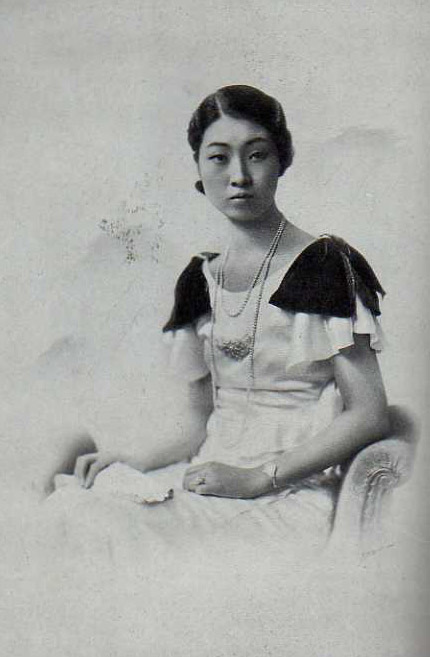
Princess Naoko, wife of Prince Kan'in Haruhito

Prince Kan'in Haruhito (閑院宮春仁王, Kan'in-no-miya Haruhito-ō; 3 August 1902 – 18 June 1988) was a career officer in the Imperial Japanese Army during World War II and the 7th (and final) head of the Kan'in-no-miya line of shinnōke cadet branches of the Imperial Family of Japan.

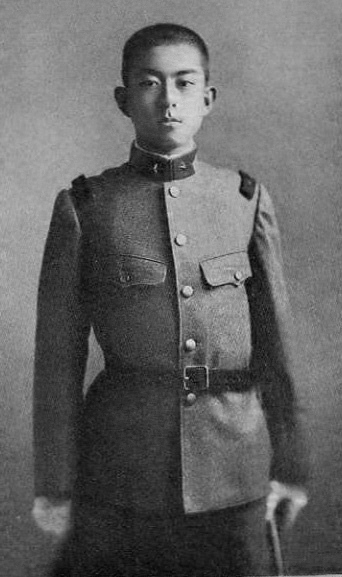
Prince Kan'in Haruhito

== Biography ==
Prince Kan'in Haruhito was the only surviving son of Field Marshal Prince Kan'in Kotohito (1865–1945) and his consort, the former Sanjō Chieko (1872–1947). He married Ichijō Naoko (1908–1991), daughter of Prince (peer) Saneteru Ichijō on 14 July 1926.

Prince Kan'in attended the Gakushuin Peers' School and graduated from the 44th class of the Imperial Japanese Army Academy in 1924. He was a lieutenant in the infantry and served in the Imperial Guard Division. Following a course in the Military Staff College in 1927, he was promoted to captain and joined the faculty of the Cavalry School. He graduated from the 44th class of the Army Staff College in 1932 and rose to the rank of major in 1936.

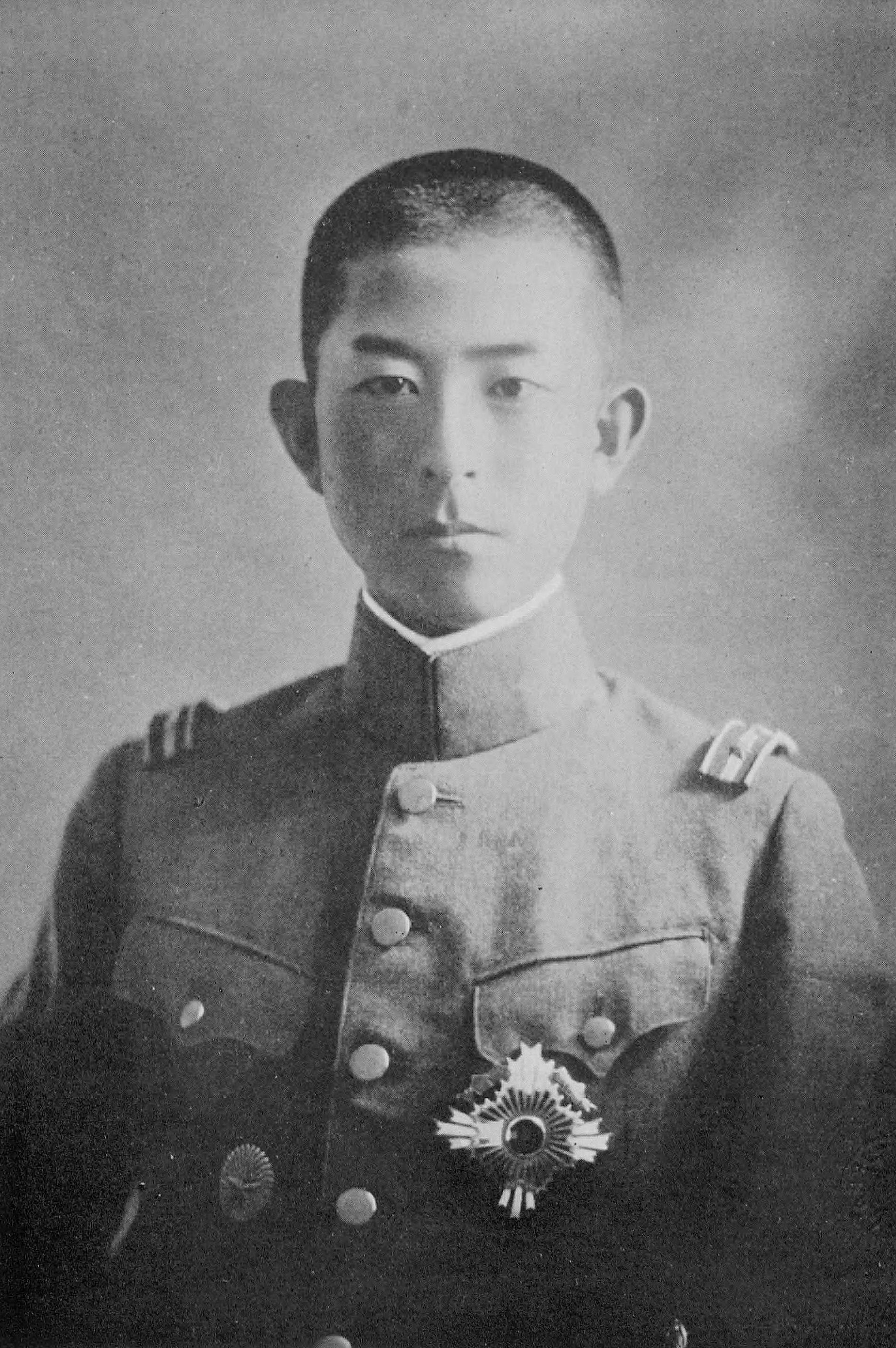
Prince Kan'in as a Captain

Prince Kan'in saw a brief tour of combat duty during the Second Sino-Japanese War with the Northern China Area Army from November 1937 to May 1938.

Prince Kan'in returned to Japan to be an instructor at the Army Staff College and was promoted to lieutenant colonel in March 1939. He was promoted to colonel in August 1941, and was then attached to the Chiba Army Tank School. He was promoted to colonel in 1944, becoming commander of the IJA 5th Tank Regiment. He became the seventh head of the Kan'in-no-miya house upon the death of his father on 20 May 1945, and retired from active military service at that time. However, he was recalled to active duty and promoted to major general in 1945, when he was placed in command of the IJA 4th Armored Division and three independent infantry regiments assigned to combat the projected American landings on the beaches of Kujukurihama, Chiba Prefecture, outside of Tokyo.

After the surrender of Japan, he was tasked with visiting Saigon as an official representative of Emperor Hirohito, to ensure the compliance of the Japanese Southern Expeditionary Army Group with the surrender.

With the abolition of the collateral branches of the Imperial family and other titles of nobility by the American occupation authorities on 14 October 1947, he became a commoner, and was purged from public life because of his former military career. He was forced to sell his residence at Nagatachō in downtown Tokyo to pay for taxes, and moved to the Kan'in summer house in Odawara, Kanagawa. He pursued several unsuccessful business opportunities, lost his family fortune, and divorced his wife in 1966. Ex-Princess Naoko created a scandal by attributing the couple's lack of children to her husband's homosexuality in newspaper interviews held shortly after their divorce. Ex-Prince Kan'in changed his name from "Haruhito" to "Sumihito", and established a company called Asahi Kōsan, of which he became president. The company profited through development of land near Tamachi, Tokyo and of the ex-princes, Kan'in Sumihito was one of the more prosperous in the 1960s and 1970s.

In the early 1970s, Kan'in Sumihito was president of the Japan Yoga Association. He died on 18 June 1988.
