= Naohito, Prince Kan'in =

Japanese imperial prince (1704–1753)

Naohito, Prince Kan'in 閑院宮直仁親王
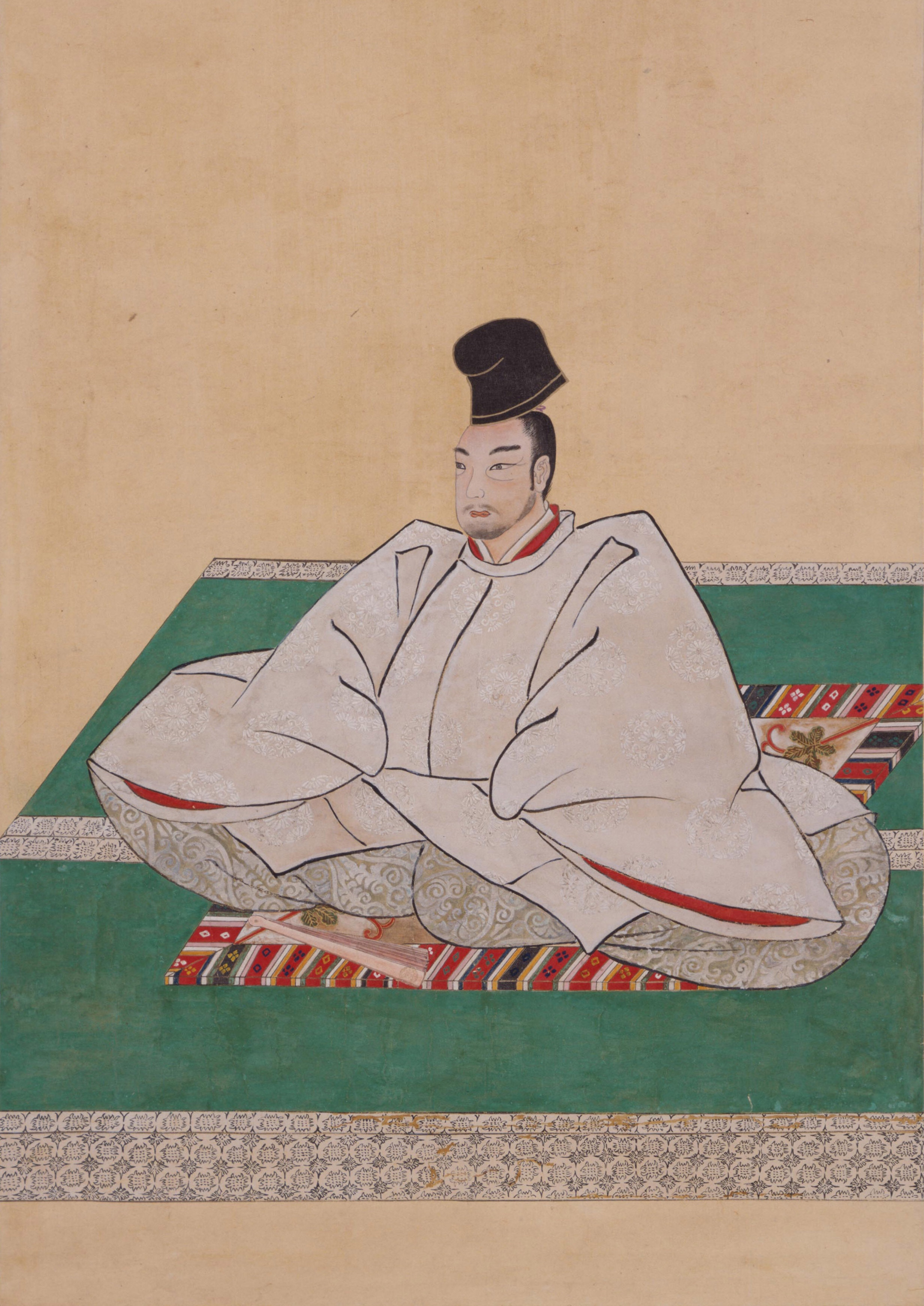
- Born: 7 October 1704
- Died: 3 July 1753 (aged 48)
- Spouse: Konoe Shūsi (近衛脩子)
- Father: Emperor Higashiyama
- Mother: Kushige Yoshiko (櫛笥賀子)
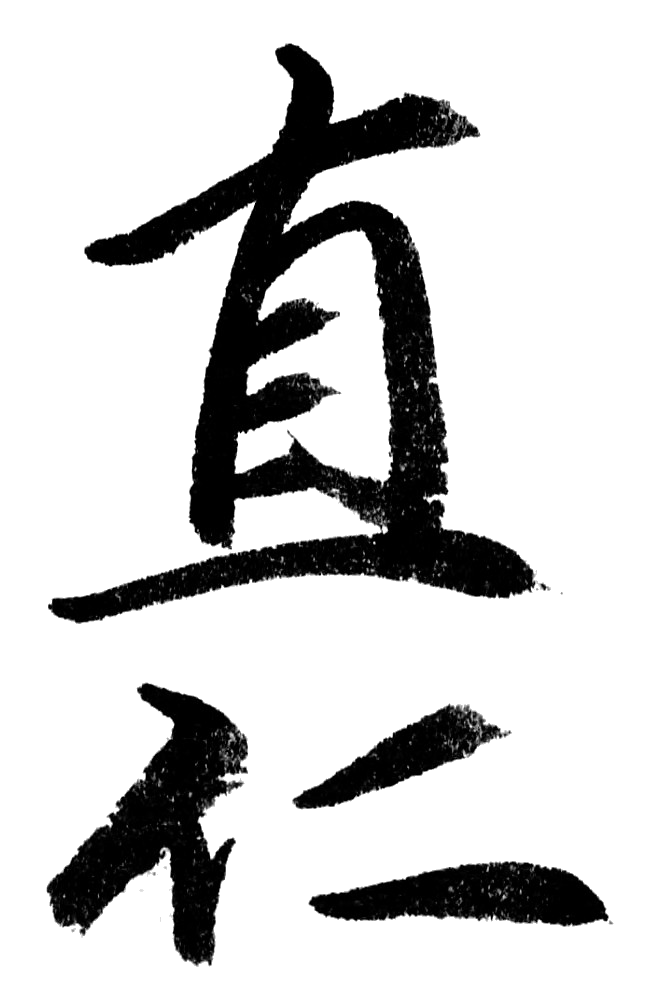
- Signature

Naohito, Prince Kan'in (Note: Hepburn romanization: Kan'innomiya Naohito Shin'nō (Japanese: 閑院宮直仁親王)) (7 October 1704 – 3 July 1753), was the founder of the Kan'in-no-miya, a cadet branch of the Imperial House of Japan. He was the sixth son of Emperor Higashiyama, as well as the younger brother of Emperor Nakamikado and grandfather of Emperor Kōkaku.

== Biography ==
Naohito, originally named Hide-no-miya (秀宮) in his childhood, was an younger son of Emperor Higashiyama by his concubine Kushige Yoshiko, mother of the future Emperor Nakamikado.

In the early Edo period, minor members from the Imperial family and Japanese nobles that were unlikely to succeed a title would become Buddhist monks and be excluded from succession; however, after the early death of Emperor Go-Kōmyō, the Scholar-official Arai Hakuseki found it imminent to create a new shinnōke for one of the imperial princes to retain the succession right, in case of main line of the Imperial family should extinct. Emperor Higashiyama abdicated in 1709, succeeded by his son Emperor Nakamikado, and it was decided that a shinnōke would be granted to Hide-no-miya as of 1710; the title Kan'in-no-miya with fief of 1,000 koku was given by retired Emperor Reigen, and Naohito resided in southwest of the Kyoto Imperial Palace, later known as the Kan-in no Miya Residence.

Prince Naohito married his third cousin Konoe Shūsi (近衛脩子), younger daughter of former regent Konoe Motohiro, in 1715; she had two daughters, and the elder married to Tannyo (湛如) of the Ōtani family while the other died young. Shūsi died young in 1727, and the rest of Prince Naohito's children were born to different concubines. After the premature death of Takatsukasa Mototeru, Naohito's younger son was chosen to succeed Takatsukasa family in 1743 and was later known as Takatsukasa Sukehira. Kan'in-no-miya was succeeded by Prince Naohito's third son Sukehito, whose mother was concubine Sanuki (讃岐) of the Itō clan.
