= Prince Kan'in Kotohito =

Japanese prince and general (1865–1945)

- 閑院宮載仁親王
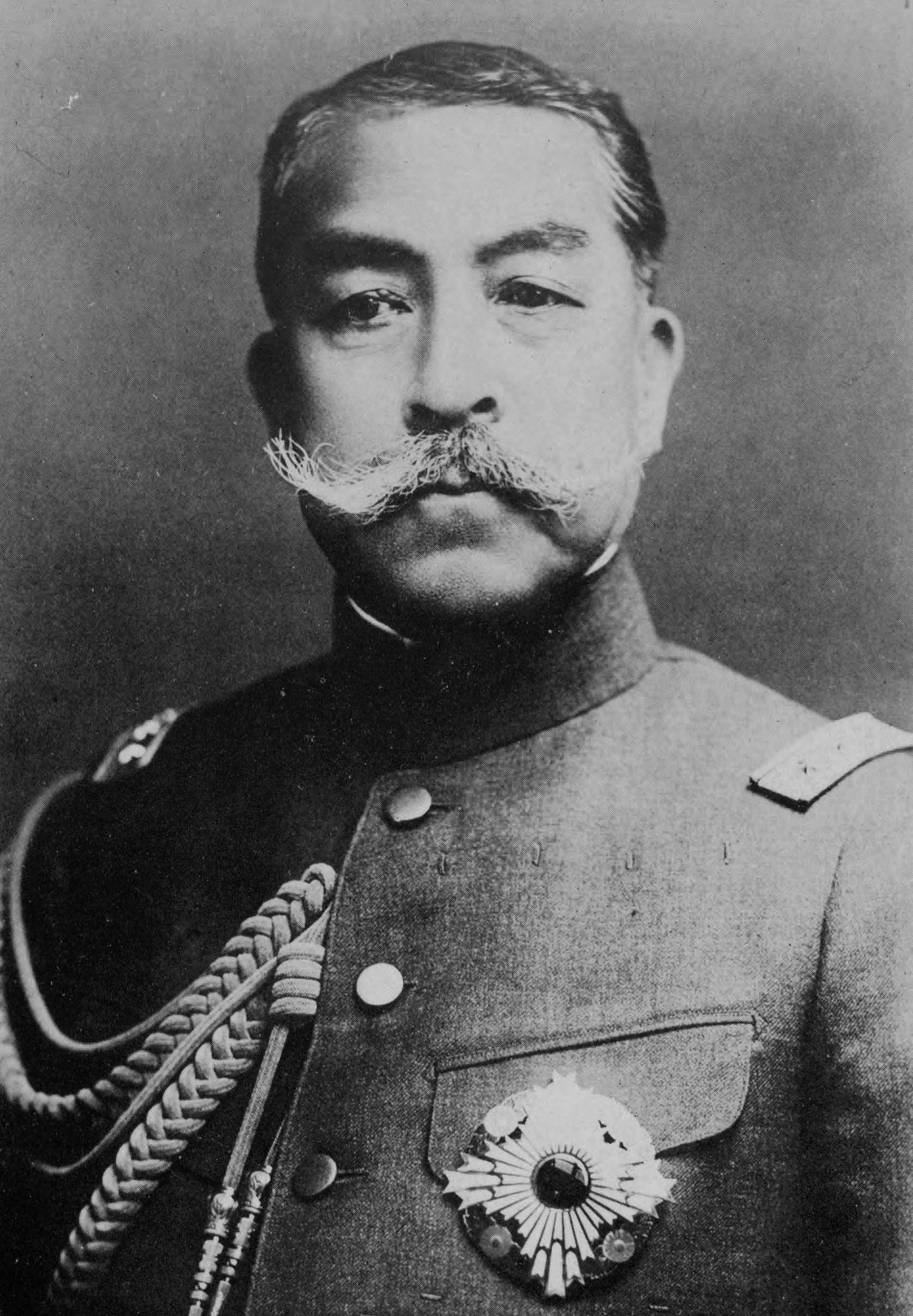
- Kotohito in 1937

Chief of the Imperial Japanese Army General Staff
- In office 23 December 1931 – 3 September 1940
- Monarch: Shōwa
- Preceded by: Hanzō Kanaya
- Succeeded by: Hajime Sugiyama

Personal details
- Born: 10 November 1865 Kyoto, Japan
- Died: 20 May 1945 (aged 79) Odawara, Kanagawa, Japan
- Relations: Prince Kan'in Haruhito
- Awards: Order of the Golden Kite (1st Class); Supreme Order of the Chrysanthemum
- Nickname: Prince messenger

Military service
- Allegiance: Empire of Japan
- Branch/service: Imperial Japanese Army
- Years of service: 1881–1945
- Rank: Field Marshal
- Commands: 1st Division; Imperial Guards Division; Chief of Army General Staff
- Battles/wars: First Sino-Japanese War; Russo-Japanese War; Second Sino-Japanese War; Battle of Wuhan

Prince Kan'in Kotohito (閑院宮載仁親王, Kan'in-no-miya Kotohito-shinnō; 10 November 1865 – 20 May 1945) was the sixth head of a cadet branch of the Japanese imperial family, and a career army officer who served as Chief of the Imperial Japanese Army General Staff from 1931 to 1940. During his tenure as the Chief of the Imperial Japanese Army General Staff, the Imperial Japanese Army committed numerous war crimes against Chinese civilians including the Nanjing Massacre and the systemic use of chemical and bacteriological weapons. Prince Kan'in Kotohito died several months before the end of the Second World War.

== Early years ==
Prince Kotohito was born in Kyoto on 10 November 1865, as the sixteenth son of Prince Fushimi Kuniie (1802–1875). His father was the twentieth head of the Fushimi-no-miya, one of the four shinnōke, branches of the Imperial Family which were eligible to succeed to the throne if the main line should die out. Since the infant mortality rate in the main imperial household was quite high, Emperor Kōmei, the father of Emperor Meiji, adopted Prince Kotohito as a potential heir. Prince Kotohito was thus the adopted brother of Emperor Meiji and a great uncle to both Emperor Shōwa and his consort, Empress Kōjun.

Prince Kotohito was initially sent to Sambō-in monzeki temple at the age of three to be raised as a Buddhist monk, but was selected in 1872 to revive the Kan'in-no-miya, another of the shinnōke households, which had gone extinct upon the death of the fifth head, Prince Naruhito.

== Marriage and family ==
On 19 December 1891, Prince Kotohiko married Sanjō Chieko (30 January 1872 – 19 March 1947), a daughter of Prince Sanjō Sanetomi. The couple had seven children: five daughters and two sons.

1. Prince Kan'in Atsuhito (篤仁王, Atsuhito-ō; 1894–1894)
2. Princess Kan'in Yukiko (恭子女王, Yukiko Joō; 1896–1992)
3. Princess Kan'in Shigeko (茂子女王, Shigeko Joō; 1897–1991)
4. Princess Kan'in Sueko (季子女王, Sueko Joō; 1898–1914)
5. Prince Kan'in Haruhito (閑院宮春仁王, Kan’in-no-miya Haruhito-ō; 1902–1988)
6. Princess Kan'in Hiroko (寛子女王, Hiroko Joō; 1906–1923)
7. Princess Kan'in Hanako (華子女王, Hanako Joō; 1909–2003)

== Early military career ==
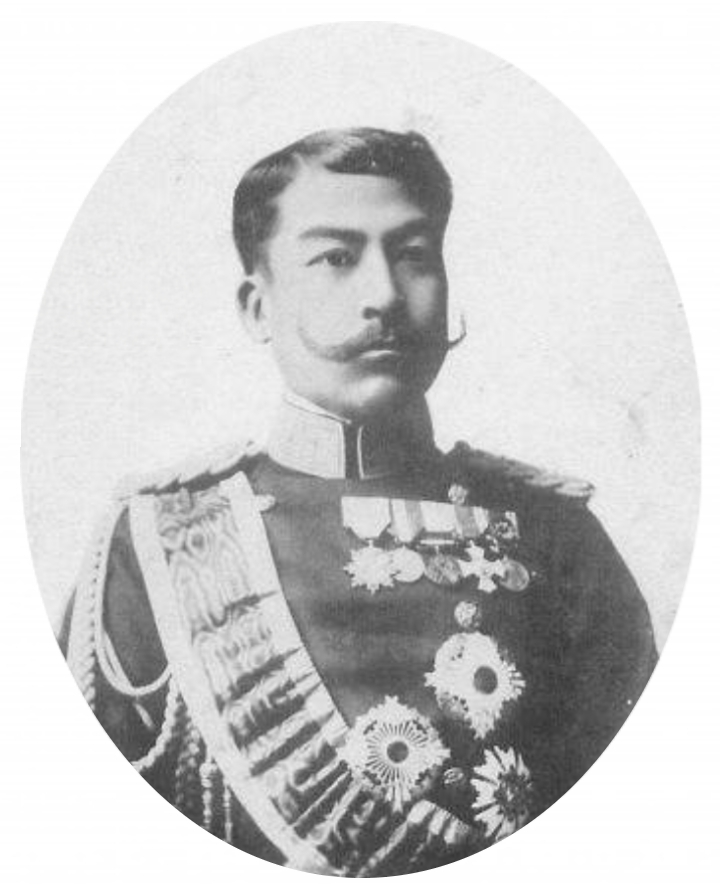
Prince Kan'in Kotohito in 1907

Prince Kan'in entered the Imperial Japanese Army Academy in 1877 and graduated in 1881. Emperor Meiji sent him as a military attaché to France in 1882 to study military tactics and technology. He graduated from the Army Staff College in 1894, specializing in cavalry. He commanded the 1st Cavalry Regiment from 1897 to 1899.

Kan'in became a veteran of both the First Sino-Japanese War (1894–1895) and the Russo-Japanese War (1904–1905). He was appointed to command the 2nd Cavalry Brigade in 1901. He rose to the rank of lieutenant general in 1905 and became the commander of the IJA 1st Division in 1906, and the Imperial Guard Division in 1911. He was promoted to the rank of full general and became a Supreme War Councilor in 1912. He was further promoted to become the youngest field marshal in the Imperial Japanese Army in 1919. In 1921, he accompanied then-Crown Prince Hirohito on his tour of Western Europe.

== Chief of the Imperial General Staff ==
On 1 December 1931, Prince Kan'in became Chief of the Imperial Japanese Army General Staff, replacing General Kanaya Hanzo. During his tenure, the Imperial Japanese Army committed many war crimes against Chinese civilians including the Nanjing massacre and the systemic use of chemical and bacteriological weapons.

As Chief of the General Staff, Kan'in authorized the use of chemical weapons in China, such as tear gas, which were used sporadically in 1937. In the spring of 1938, he further authorized the use of sneezing gas. Later, in the summer of 1939, he approved the use of mustard gas against both Kuomintang and Communist Chinese troops. On 28 July 1937, Prince Kan'in transmitted to the Army the emperor's first directive (rinsanmei) authorizing the use of chemical weapons. He transmitted a second order on 11 September authorizing the deployment of special chemical warfare units to Shanghai. On 11 April 1938, Directive Number 11 was issued in his name, authorizing further use of poison gas in Inner Mongolia.

In Shanxi Province, poisonous gases were used to counter the guerilla warfare of the 8th Route Army of the National Revolutionary Army. Large amounts of sneezing gas were utilized against the Chinese National Revolutionary Army at the Battle of Wuhan and in the Central China region. Lethal blister gases, such as yperite and lewisite, were deployed by Japanese forces after 1939.

In July 1940, he forced the resignation of War Minister General Shunroku Hata (1879–1962), thus bringing down the cabinet of Prime Minister Mitsumasa Yonai. The Prince was also a participant in the liaison conferences between the military chiefs of staff and the second cabinet of Prince Fumimaro Konoe (June 1940–July 1941). Both he and the newly appointed War Minister, General Hideki Tojo, supported the Tripartite Pact and Anti-Comintern Pact between the Empire of Japan, Nazi Germany, and Fascist Italy.

== Honours ==
Prince Kan'in Kotohito

Prince Kan'in
- Reign: 18 February 1872 - 20 May 1945
- Predecessor: Prince Kan'in Naruhito
- Successor: Prince Kan'in Haruhito
- Father: Prince Fushimi Kuniie; Emperor Kōmei (adoptive father)

He received the following orders and decorations:

- Empire of Japan:
  - Collar of the Order of the Chrysanthemum
  - Order of the Golden Kite, 1st Class
- France: Grand Cross of the Legion of Honour, 5 October 1895
- Russian Empire: Knight of the Order of St. Alexander Nevsky, 2 November 1898
- Belgium: Grand Cordon of the Royal Order of Leopold, with Swords, 28 April 1900
- Kingdom of Italy: Knight of the Order of the Annunciation, 20 May 1900
- Ottoman Empire: Order of Osmanieh, 1st Class, 29 May 1900
- Austria-Hungary: Grand Cross of the Order of St. Stephen, 7 June 1900
- German Empire:
  - Grand Cross of the Order of the Red Eagle, 23 June 1900
  - Knight of the Order of Merit of the Prussian Crown, with Swords, 22 June 1906
  - Hohenzollern: Cross of Honour of the Princely House Order of Hohenzollern, 1st Class, with Swords, 18 November 1905
- Qing dynasty: Order of the Double Dragon, Class I Grade II, 27 January 1904
- United Kingdom: Honorary Knight Grand Cross of the Order of St Michael and St George, 1921

== Gallery ==
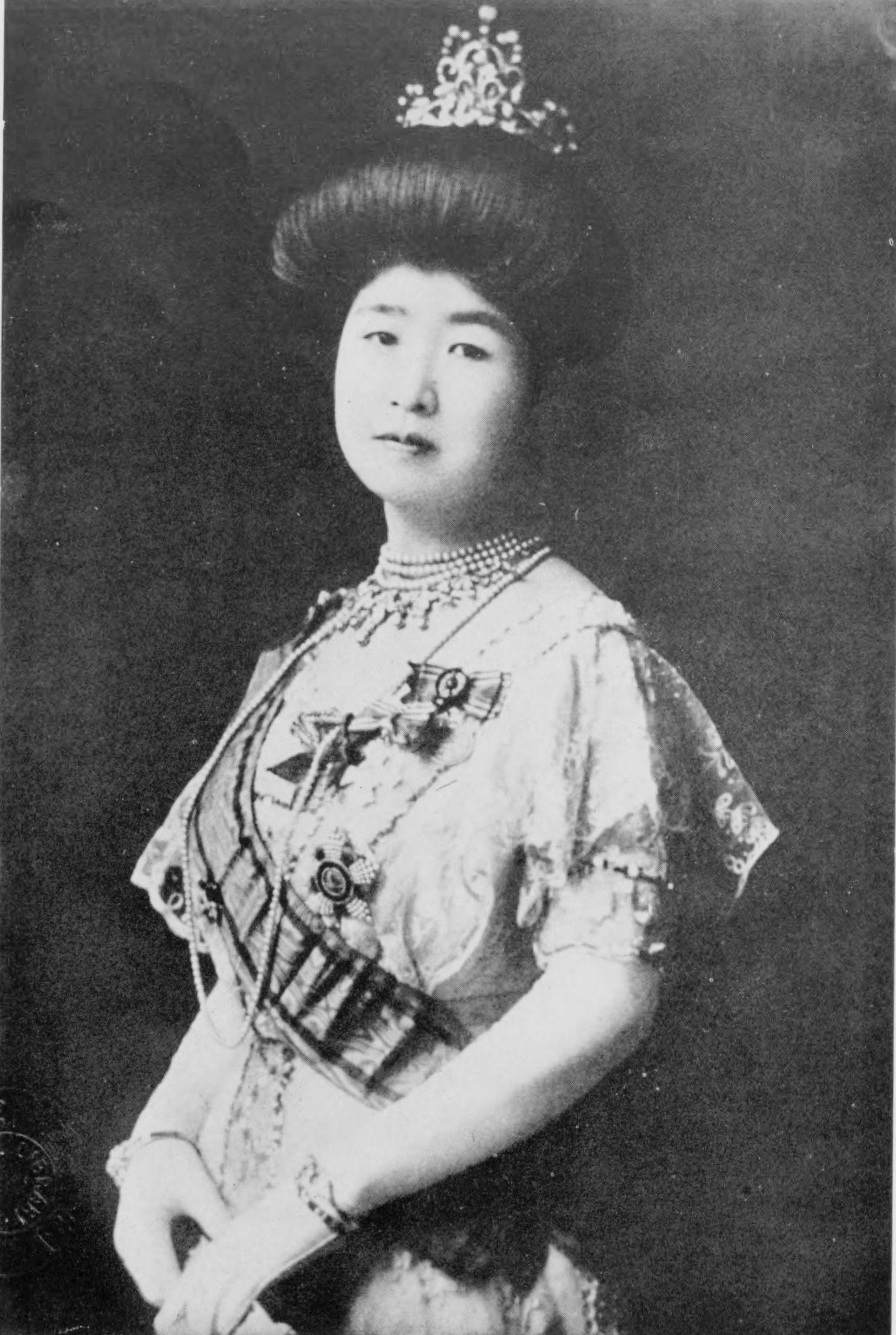
Princess Kan'in Chieko

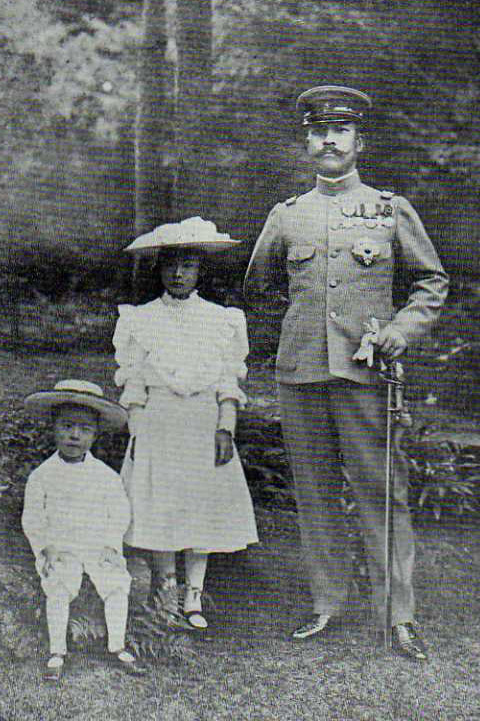
Prince Kan'in Kotohito with Princess Yukiko and Prince Haruhito

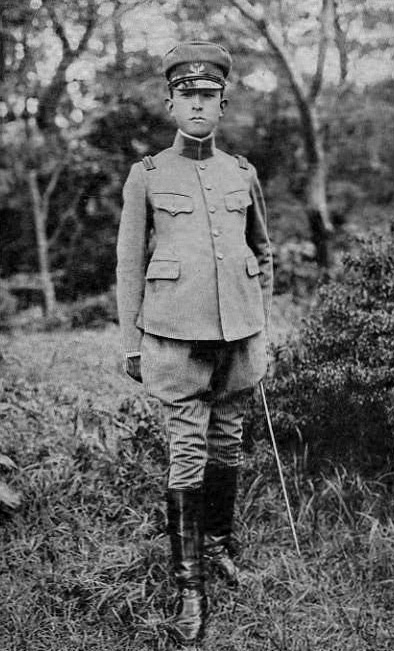
Prince Kan'in Haruhito

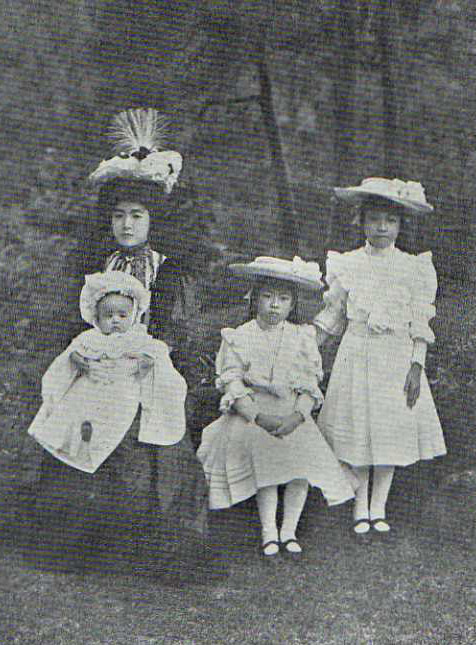
Princess Kan'in Chieko with Princesses Shigeko, Sueko and Hiroko

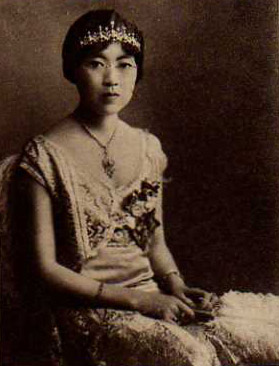
Princess Kan'in Hanako

== Notes ==
Military offices
Preceded by Kanaya Hanzo	Chief of Army General Staff; 1931–1940	Succeeded by Hajime Sugiyama
