= Kan'in-no-miya =

Extinct (1988) branch Japanese royalty

Kan'in-no-miya 閑院宮
- Branch of the Imperial Family of Japan (shinnōke)
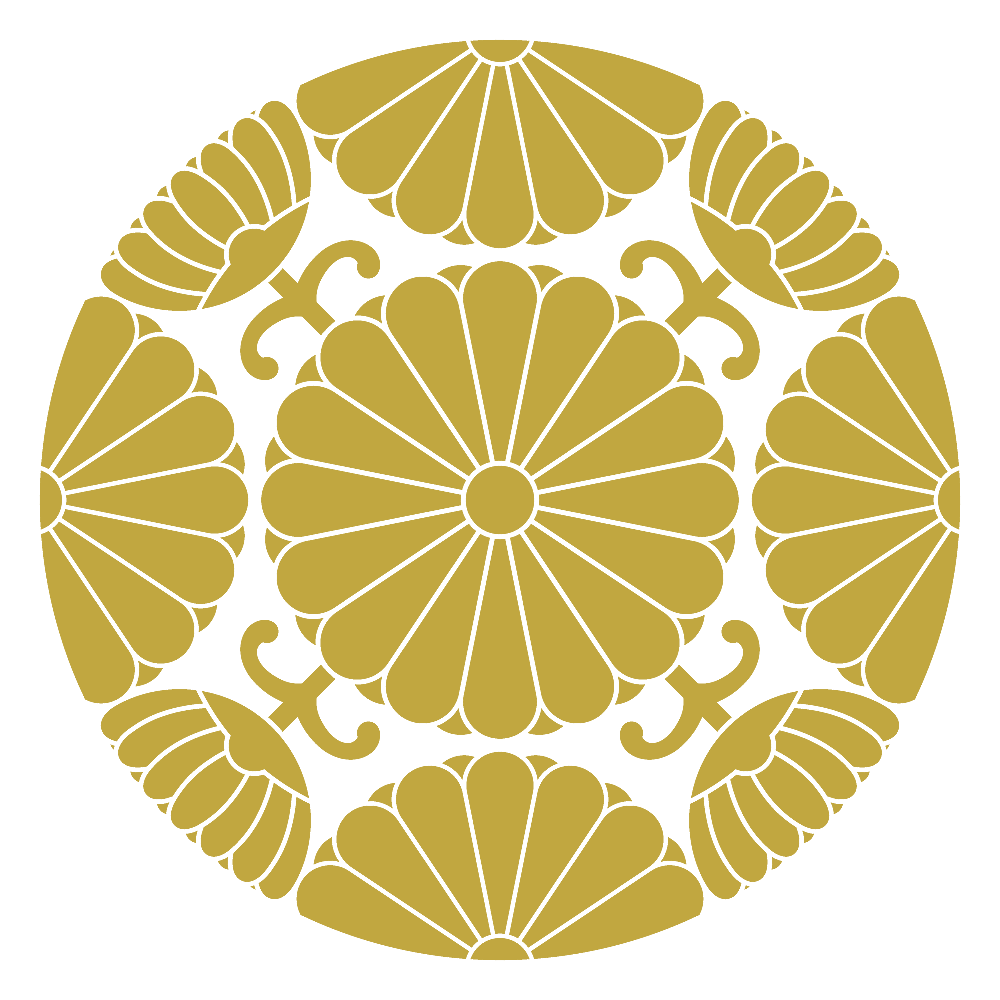
- Mon of Kan'in-no-miya
- Parent family: Imperial Family of Japan
- Origin: Kyoto
- Founded: 1710
- Founder: Imperial Prince Kanin Naohito (Emperor Higashiyama's sixth son)
- Final head: Prince Kan'in Haruhito
- Connected families: Arisugawa-no-miya; Katsura-no-miya; Fushimi-no-miya; Takatsukasa noble family
- Deposition: 1947

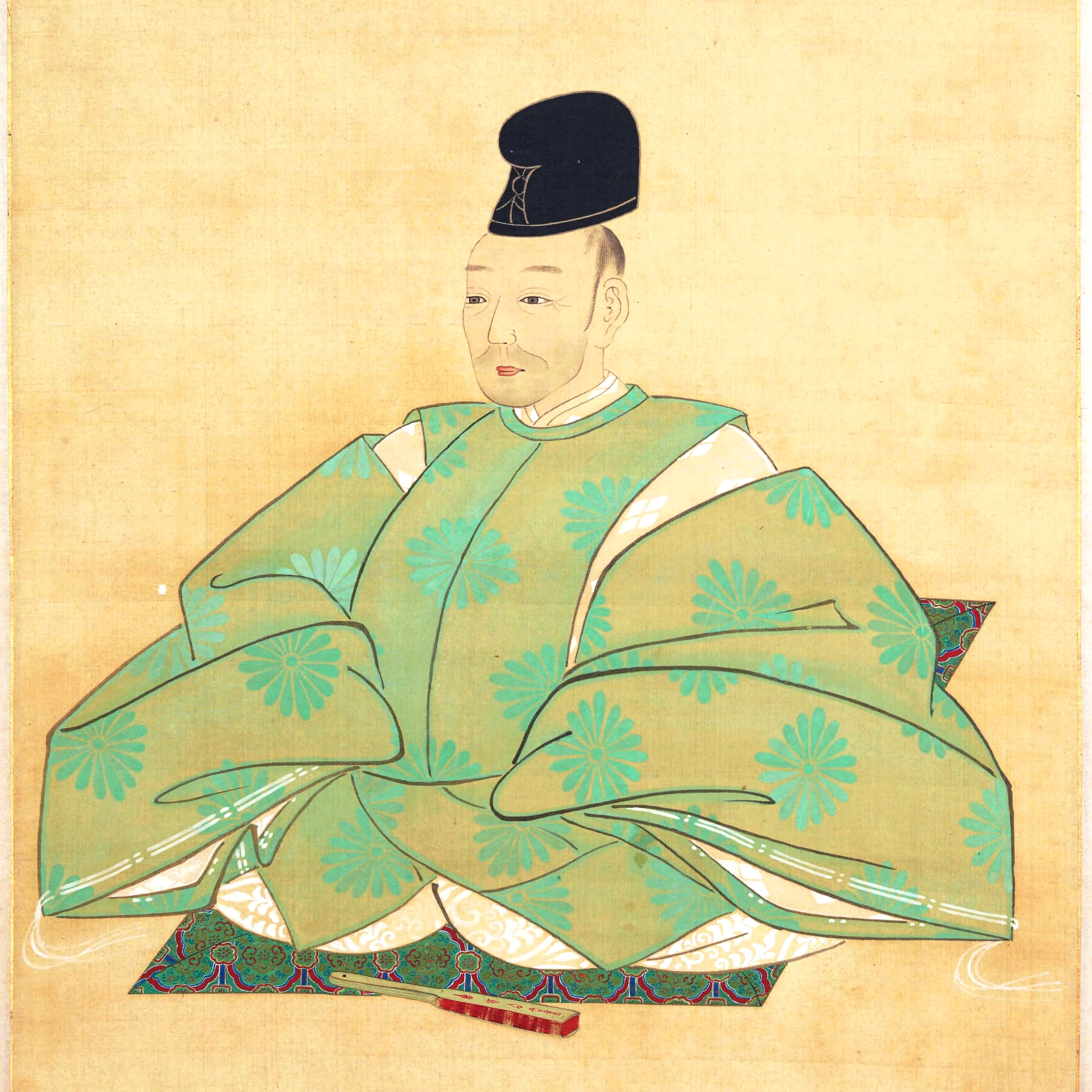
Imperial Prince Sukehito, second head of the house and father of Emperor Kōkaku

The Kan'in-no-miya (閑院宮家) was the youngest of the four shinnōke, branches of the Imperial Family of Japan which were eligible to succeed to the Chrysanthemum Throne in the event that the main line should die out.

== History ==
It was founded by Prince Naohito, the son of Emperor Higashiyama.

Fearing extinction of the imperial house, Arai Hakuseki proposed that a new branch of the Imperial Family be created. In 1718, Emperor Emeritus Reigen bestowed upon his grandson the title of Kan'in-no-miya and land worth 1000 koku. This was the first new shinnōke formed since the Arisugawa-no-miya lineage in 1625.

The name Kan'in-no-miya is thought to have come from the title of Prince Sadamoto, a son of the Heian-era Emperor Seiwa.

Arai Hakusei's wisdom was soon proved with the second head of the house, Imperial Prince Sukehito. When Emperor Go-Momozono died in 1779, he had only a daughter. Sukehito's younger son was adopted by the previous emperor and ascended the throne as Emperor Kōkaku.

The Kan'in House became extinct upon the death of its 5th head, Prince Kan'in Naruhito, in 1842, but was revived by Emperor Meiji, who assigned the name to Prince Kotohito, 16th son of Prince Fushimi Kuniie (one of the other shinnoke houses).

In 1988 the line became extinct again with the death of his son, Kan'in Sumihito (formerly Kan'in-no-miya Haruhito shinnō), who had no children.

The Kan'in-no-miya name became extinct, but its male-line bloodline survives in the reigning imperial house through Emperor Kōkaku, from whom all subsequent emperors, including the current emperor, descend.

	Name	Born	Succeeded	Resigned	Died
1	Kan'in-no-miya Naohito shinnō (閑院宮 直仁親王)	1704	1718	.	1753
2	Kan'in-no-miya Sukehito shinnō (閑院宮 典仁親王)	1733	1753	.	1794
3	Kan'in-no-miya Haruhito shinnō (閑院宮 美仁親王)	1768	1794	.	1818
4	Kan'in-no-miya Tatsuhito shinnō (閑院宮 孝仁親王)	1792	1818	.	1824
5	Kan'in-no-miya Naruhito shinnō (閑院宮 愛仁親王)	1818	1828	.	1842
6	Kan'in-no-miya Kotohito shinnō (閑院宮 載仁親王)	1865	1872	.	1945
7	Kan'in-no-miya Haruhito shinnō (閑院宮 春仁親王)	1902	1945	1947	1988
