= Shinkai (divine rank) =

System of ranking deities in Japan

Shinkai (神階; "divine rank") was a system in Japan of imperially granted ranks to the kami of Shinto, the first recording of which occurred in 746, and the practice continued until it was abolished in the Meiji era.

== See also ==
- Modern system of ranked Shinto shrines
