= Sukehito, Prince Kan'in =

- Emperor Kyōkō
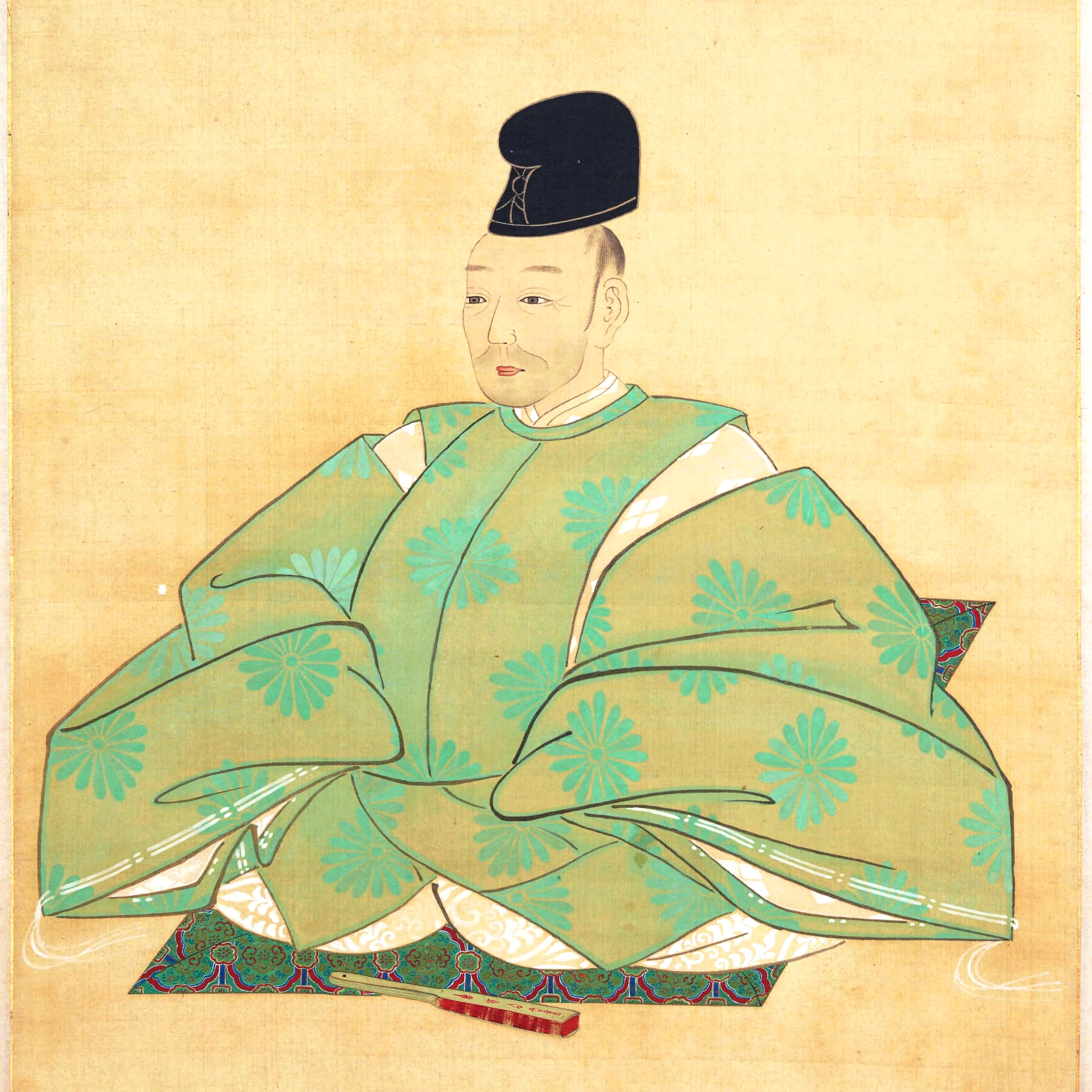
- Portrait of Sukehito, Prince Kan'in
- Born: 1 April 1733
- Died: 1 August 1794 (aged 61)
- Burial: 16 August 1794; Imperial Mausoleum of Emperor Kyōkō
- Spouse: Fusako, Princess Kazu
- Issue: Emperor Kōkaku
- Father: Naohito, Prince Kan'in
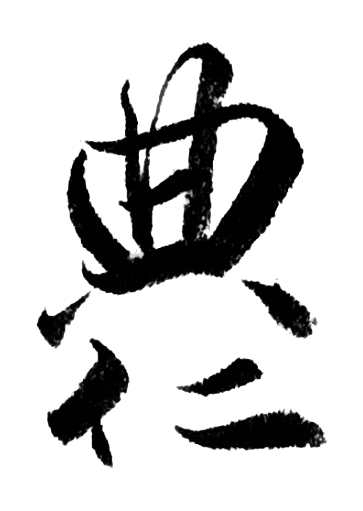
- Signature

Sukehito, Prince Kan'in (Japanese: 閑院宮典仁親王, romanized: Kan'innomiya Sukehito Shin'nō, 1 April 1733 – 1 August 1794), posthumously named Emperor Kyōkō (慶光天皇), was the second head of the Kan'in House, a branch of the imperial family. He was the grandson of Emperor Higashiyama and father of Emperor Kōkaku.

== Biography ==
Sukehito, also named Hisanomiya (寿宮) in his childhood, was the third son of Naohito, Prince Kan'in (閑院宮直仁親王). He was appointed as a yuushi (猶子) of, or one of the heirs to, his cousin Emperor Sakuramachi on 12 March 1742, and was proclaimed prince on 4 September 1743. Five years after coming of age, Sukehito married Fusako, Princess Kazu (籌宮成子内親王), fifth daughter of Emperor Nakamikado in 1749. He succeeded as Prince Kan'in and as the head of the house in 1753 after his father died.

As a result of the death of heirless Emperor Go-Momozono, Morohito, son of Sukehito with his concubine Ōe Iwashiro, ascended the throne as Emperor Kōkaku in 1779. A year later, the new monarch promoted his father as the first amongst the princes, and continued in seeking to elevate him. In 1789, Kōkaku attempted to bestow the title of retired emperor, or Daijō Tennō, on him, but the chief senior councillor Matsudaira Sadanobu objected. As a concession, Kōkaku raised the Kokudaka of Sukehito after abandoning the idea in 1792. The row between the nobleman and the emperor, however, was one of the factors that contributed the downfall of Sadanobu.

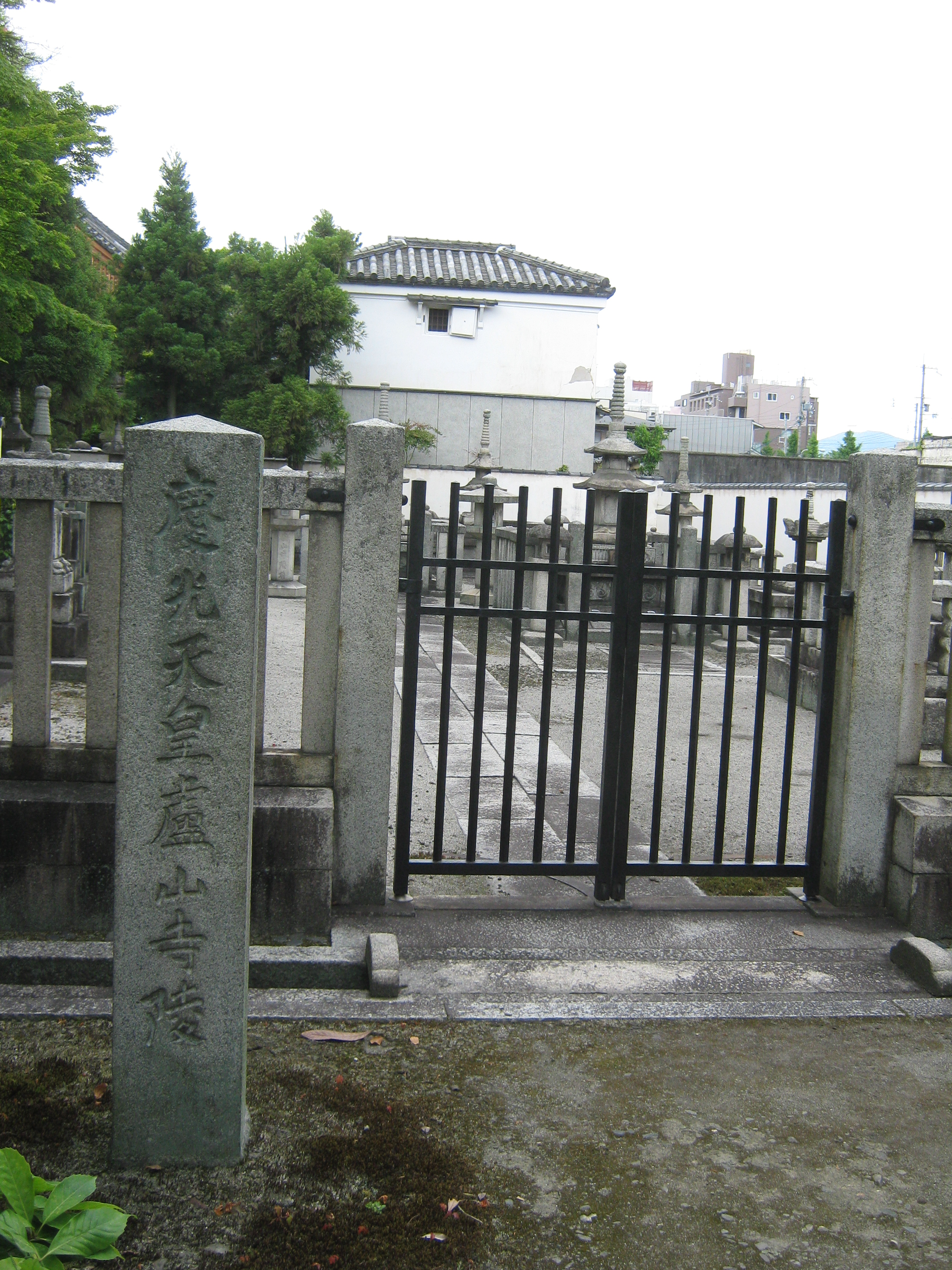
Imperial Mausoleum of Emperor Kyōkō in Kamigyō-ku, Kyoto

Sukehito died on 1 August 1794, at the age of 61, and was buried in the Imperial Mausoleum of Emperor Kyōkō in Kamigyō-ku, Kyoto. His eldest son, Prince Yoshihito (美仁親王), succeeded the title of Prince Kan'in.

In 1884, 90 years after his death, Marquess Nakayama Tadayasu, maternal grandfather of Emperor Meiji, proposed bestowing a posthumous title upon the late prince. In March, Sukehito was posthumously conferred the imperial title of Emperor Kyōkō, which was required as a result of the abolishment of the retiring title in the Meiji era, before formally bestowing the imperial title of Daijō Tennō by Meiji. He was therefore also recognised as Keikoin (慶光院).

== Ancestry ==
Ancestry of Sukehito, Prince Kan'in

8. Emperor Reigen
4. Emperor Higashiyama
9. Matsuki Muneko
2. Naohito, Prince Kan'in
10. Kushige Takayoshi
5. Kushige Yoshiko
1. Sukehito, Prince Kan'in
6. Ito Ichichu
3. Ito Sanuki
