= Arisugawa-no-miya =

Extinct (1987) branch Japanese royalty

Arisugawa-no-miya 有栖川宮: Takamatsu-no-miya 高松宮 (1625–1638); Hanamachi-no-miya 花町宮 (1647–1655)
- Branch of the Imperial Family of Japan (shinnōke)
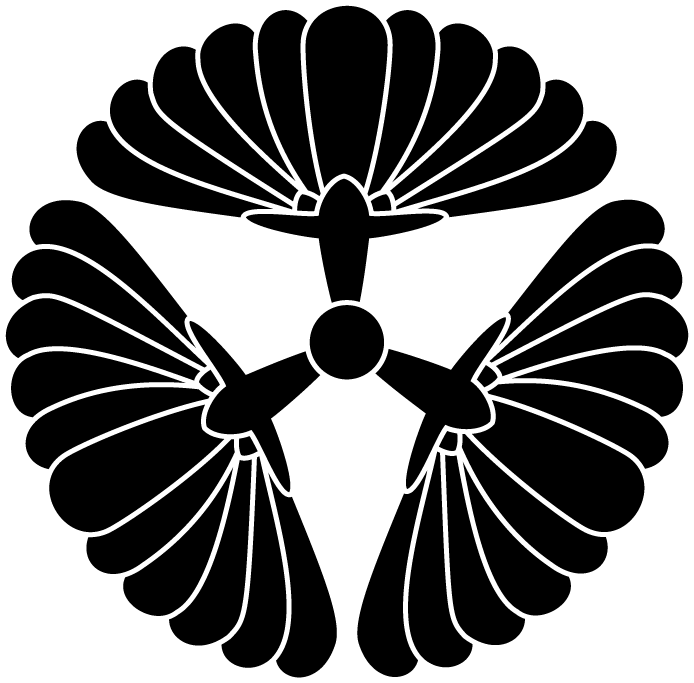
- Mon of Arisugawa-no-miya
- Parent family: Imperial Family of Japan
- Origin: Yamashiro Province
- Founded: 1625
- Founder: Imperial Prince Takamatsu Yoshihito (Emperor Go-Yōzei's seventh son)
- Final head: Imperial Prince Arisugawa Takehito
- Connected families: Mito Tokugawa family
- Traditions: Calligraphy, Waka
- Dissolution: 1913

The Arisugawa-no-miya (有栖川宮) was one of the shinnōke, branches of the Imperial Family of Japan which were, until 1947, eligible to succeed to the Chrysanthemum Throne in the event that the main line should die out.

== History ==
The Arisugawa-no-miya house was founded by Prince Yoshihito, seventh son of Emperor Go-Yōzei (d. 1638), and was originally named Takamatsu-no-miya. The house changed its name to Arisugawa-no-miya after its second head, Prince Nagahito, was elevated to the throne as Emperor Go-Sai.

The Arisugawa-no-miya house traditionally served as instructors in calligraphy and waka composition to successive generations of Emperors. After the Meiji Restoration in 1868, when Emperor Meiji was restored, his uncle, Prince Arisugawa Taruhito (1835–1895), became commander-in-chief, and in 1875 Chancellor of the Realm. After his suppression of the Satsuma Rebellion in 1875, he was made a field-marshal, and he was again commander-in-chief in the First Sino-Japanese War. His younger brother, Prince Arisugawa Takehito (1862–1913), was from 1879 to 1882 attached to the British navy, as a military attaché and later as a cadet. He went on to command positions in the Imperial Japanese Navy and represented Japan in formal visits to England.

The Arisugawa line ended early in the twentieth century when no male heirs remained. However, the Imperial Household Agency revived the original title of Takamatsu-no-miya for the third son of Emperor Taishō. The line again became extinct on Prince Takamatsu Nobuhito’s death, as he had no children.

In 2003, an impostor to the Arisugawa line appeared who was actually Yasuyuki Kitano, the son of a greengrocer. He fraudulently received ¥13 million from supporters of the Imperial family. Kitano was found guilty and imprisoned for 26 months for the con.

== Family heads ==
	Name	Born	Succeeded	Resigned	Died
1	Takamatsu-no-miya Yoshihito Shinnō (高松宮 好仁親王)	1603	1625	.	1638
2	Hanamachi-no-miya Nagahito Shinnō (花町宮 良仁親王)	1638	1647	1654	1685
3	Arisugawa-no-miya Yukihito Shinnō (有栖川宮 幸仁親王)	1656	1667	.	1699
4	Arisugawa-no-miya Tadahito Shinnō (有栖川宮 正仁親王)	1694	1699	.	1716
5	Arisugawa-no-miya Yorihito Shinnō (有栖川宮 職仁親王)	1713	1716	.	1769
6	Arisugawa-no-miya Orihito Shinnō (有栖川宮 織仁親王)	1755	1769	.	1820
7	Arisugawa-no-miya Tsunahito Shinnō (有栖川宮 韶仁親王)	1784	1820	.	1845
8	Arisugawa-no-miya Takahito Shinnō (有栖川宮 幟仁親王)	1813	1845	1871	1886
9	Arisugawa-no-miya Taruhito Shinnō (有栖川宮 熾仁親王)	1835	1886	.	1895
10	Arisugawa-no-miya Takehito Shinnō (有栖川宮 威仁親王)	1862	1895	.	1913
※	Takamatsu-no-miya Nobuhito Shinnō (高松宮 宣仁親王)	1905	1913	.	1987

※In Imperial Household Law at that time, an Imperial prince was not taken from his birth family by the adopted family. Prince Nobuhito re-founded the Takamatsu-no-miya. Therefore, Prince Nobuhito was not considered the eleventh generation Takamatsu-no-miya but the first generation of the second Takamatsu-no-miya.

== Sources ==
- Keene, Donald. Emperor Of Japan: Meiji And His World, 1852-1912. Columbia University Press (2005). ISBN 0-231-12341-8
- Lebra, Sugiyama Takie. Above the Clouds: Status Culture of the Modern Japanese Nobility. University of California Press (1995). ISBN 0-520-07602-8
