= Shinnōke =

Cadet branches of the Imperial House of Japan

Imperial Seal of Japan

Seshū Shinnōke (世襲親王家) was the collective name for the four cadet branches of the Imperial House of Japan, which were until 1947 entitled to provide a successor to the Chrysanthemum Throne if the main line failed to produce an heir. The heads of these royal houses held the title of imperial prince (親王, shinnō), regardless of their genealogical distance from the reigning Emperor of Japan, as the term seshū in their designation meant that they were eligible for succession.

== History ==
The Imperial family of Japan considers itself a single dynasty in unbroken succession; however, the succession has often not been directly from father to son, but has been in the male line within a closely related group of people. In the Muromachi period, Prince Yoshihito, the son of the Northern Emperor Sukō was permitted to establish a parallel lineage to the main imperial line, and took the name Fushimi-no-miya from the location of his palace. Without this permission, the line would be considered commoners, and therefore excluded from the succession. This served politically to cement the reunification of the Northern and Southern Court, but provided insurance in the extreme event that the main imperial line should fail to produce a direct heir and become extinct.

This proved to be a fortunate decision, as in 1428, the son of the second Prince Fushimi-no-miya ascended the throne as Emperor Go-Hanazono.

In the Edo period, three additional seshū shinnōke households were created by the Tokugawa shogunate, in conscious imitation of the Tokugawa Gosanke.

However, aside from Emperor Go-Hanazono, the only time a member of the seshū shinnōke ascended to the throne was in 1779, when the son of Prince Kan'in-no-miya Sukehito became Emperor Kōkaku.

Within the seshū shinnōke households, younger non-heir sons (who were titled prince (親王, shinnō)), had two career options. They could "descend" to subject status with a surname such as Minamoto or Taira, and serve as a government official, or they could enter the Buddhist priesthood, generally as the head of one of the monzeki temples in and around Kyoto. During the Edo period, the latter practice became almost universal. Non-heir sons who entered the priesthood were styled princely priest (法親王, hōshinnō), and were automatically excluded from the succession, but could be recalled to "secular" status (and thus reinstated as potential successors) if the need arose. Unwed daughters, once they crossed a certain age, often became Buddhist nuns. However, marriage was the norm for them, and they could hope to enter the highest houses of the land. The great seshū shinnōke houses gave their daughters in marriage only to families of high rank, such as the kuge, daimyō or Tokugawa houses, if not to the imperial family. During and after the Meiji Restoration, members of the seshū shinnōke, whether they were elder sons or younger sons, often served in the Imperial Japanese Army or Imperial Japanese Navy.

== The four seshū shinnōke lineages ==
The four seshū shinnōke were, in order of creation:

1. Fushimi-no-miya (伏見), founded 1409 by Prince Yoshihito, still extant
2. Katsura-no-miya, founded 1589, extinct 1881
3. Arisugawa-no-miya, founded 1625, extinct 1913; revived as Takamatsu-no-miya, extinct 1987
4. Kan'in-no-miya (閑院), founded 1718, extinct 1842; revived 1872, extinct 1988

The sixteenth son of Prince Kuniie, the twentieth head of the Fushimi-no-miya, succeeded to the Kan'in-no-miya house in 1872, but the house died out in 1988 on the death of his son.

The Fushimi-no-miya house was the progenitor of ten other cadet branches of the imperial family, the ōke, during the reign of Emperor Meiji. After the 25th Fushimi-no-miya, the seshu shinnōke ceased to exist. The current head of Fushimi-no-miya, Fushimi Hiroaki, has three daughters and no male heirs to carry on the family name and title. When he dies, the last remaining seshū shinnōke lineage will become extinct. Five of the original ten ōke lineages still have male descendants.

== Dissolution ==
The shinnōke and ōke households, along with the kazoku (Japanese peerage) and the shizoku (warrior families) were reduced to Japanese nationals (Nihon kokumin) status during the American occupation of Japan, in October 1947.

== See also ==
- Hiroaki Fushimi
