= Etajima =

Island in Hiroshima Bay, Japan

Native name: 江田島 Etajima
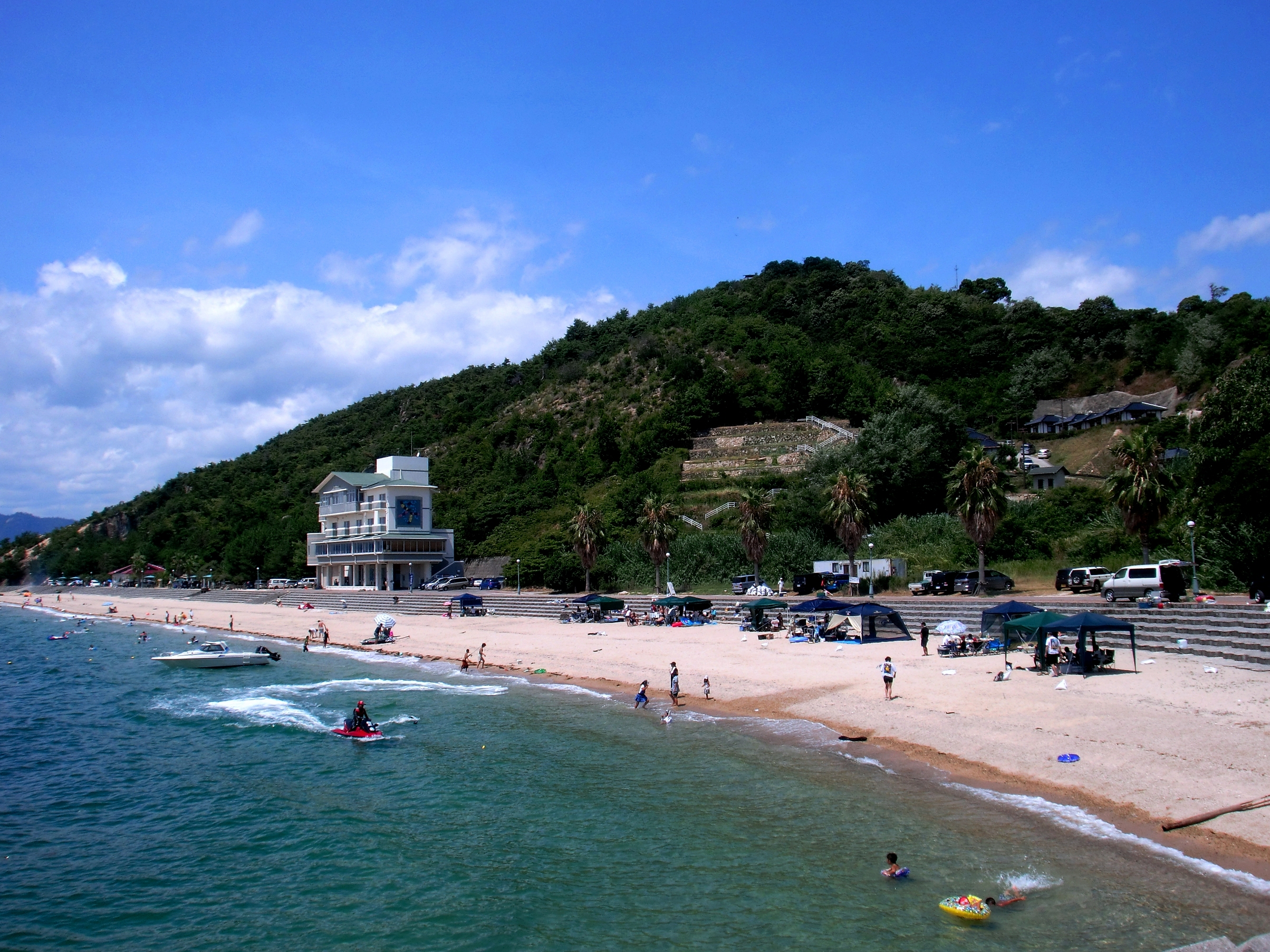

- Location within Japan

Geography
- Location: Seto Inland Sea
- Coordinates: 34°12′5″N 132°26′21″E
- Area: 91.32 km^{2} (35.26 sq mi)
- Length: 19.2 km (11.93 mi)
- Width: 10 km (6 mi)
- Highest elevation: 542 m (1778 ft)
- Highest point: mount 宇根山 (Uneyama)

Administration
- Japan
- Prefecture: Hiroshima Prefecture
- city: Etajima

Demographics
- Population: 24596
- Pop. density: 269/km^{2} (697/sq mi)
- Ethnic groups: Japanese

Etajima or Edajima (江田島; Japanese pronunciation: [è̞.tä́.(ɟ̟͡)ʑí.mä́, -dä́-]), also called Nōmi-jima, Nomijima, Nomi Island, or Etajima-Nōmijima (江田島・能美島) is an island in Hiroshima Bay located in southwestern Hiroshima Prefecture, Japan. The island name originates from the ancient (and possibly legendary) strait at now town Ōgaki-chō Hitonose (大柿町飛渡瀬).

== Geography ==
The island is roughly Y-shaped, with the former Nōmi occupying center, the Okimi - north-western branch, Etajima - north-eastern branch, and Ōgaki - the southern branch. The island's highest peak, mount 宇根山 (Uneyama) 542 m (1,778 ft) high, is located on the western edge of Nōmi town.

== Transportation ==
Since 1973, the island has been connected to the Japanese mainland of Honshu by the Hayase Ōhashi bridge passing through the Kurahashi-jima island. The island is served by the national route 487. Also, ferries are available from the cities of Hiroshima and Kure on Honshu island and Matsuyama on Shikoku island.

== History ==
The Imperial Japanese Naval Academy was moved to Etajima Island in 1888. While the academy still exists under the name Naval Academy Etajima, modern Etajima focuses on olive cultivation and fish hatcheries in Etajima Bay north of the island.

== See also ==
- Kure Naval District
