= Osamu Funae =

Japanese musician (born 1972)

Osamu Funae (born April 16, 1972) is a Japanese guitarist, singer, and whistler for the band OYSTARS.

== Early life ==
Osamu Funae was born on April 16, 1972, in Hatsukaichi, Saeki District, Hiroshima, Japan, then called Ōno, Hiroshima.

Funae attended Ohno Junior High School, where he was student council president. He graduated from Hiroshima Prefectural Hatsukaichi Nishi High School, before attending Hiroshima Information College. He dropped out to move to Tokyo.

== Career ==
In 1993, he formed the rock band the OYSTARS in Hiroshima. In 1996, he made his major debut as the band's vocalist. Representative songs include "SO SERIOUS ~Gamushara na Koi~", "Yuuki Wasurenai", and " Nanka Shiawase".

After the band went on hiatus in 2001, he began a solo career under his real name, "Osamu Funae," providing music for various artists and producing other artists' projects, events, films, and anime. In 2007, he became the President and CEO of Sam's Co. Ltd., expanding the company's business beyond the entertainment field.

In 2005, Funae released "Thank You Ohno", a song dedicated to his hometown of Ono-cho where it served as a anthem of the town.

Along with OYSTAR, Funae does whistling and singing for commercials in Japan. He also calls himself Kuchibue OSA (Whistle OSA) since 2014.
