= Recruitment in the Imperial Japanese Navy =

The Imperial Japanese Navy was created in 1868, initially the officers and sailors who manned the new navy reflected the composition of the Meiji government's bureaucracy. Samurai who originated from the victorious coalition of south-western domains dominated the navy's small officer corps. These domains which had led the restoration, particularly Satsuma, also dominated the numbers of recruits sent to the new Naval Academy which had opened in October 1869. The leadership of the new navy later took steps to reform recruitment into the officer corps, and to establish the creation of a system of recruitment based on merit rather than on class or region. In 1871, the government announced that applicants would be accepted from the public at large and that entry would be based upon competitive examinations. Eventually, in the words of Arthur Marder, the Imperial Japanese Navy turned out officers of "unquestioned professional competence, fanatical courage, and extraordinary elan". The IJN molded among the ranks a standard of discipline, self-sacrifice, and devotion to duty that became the envy of all navies in the world. Japan's later victories at sea, one commentator has observed, "came as much from the training and morale of the average Japanese seaman as from the effectiveness of the navy's ships or the caliber of its guns".

== Early years ==
=== Establishment of the Officer Corps ===
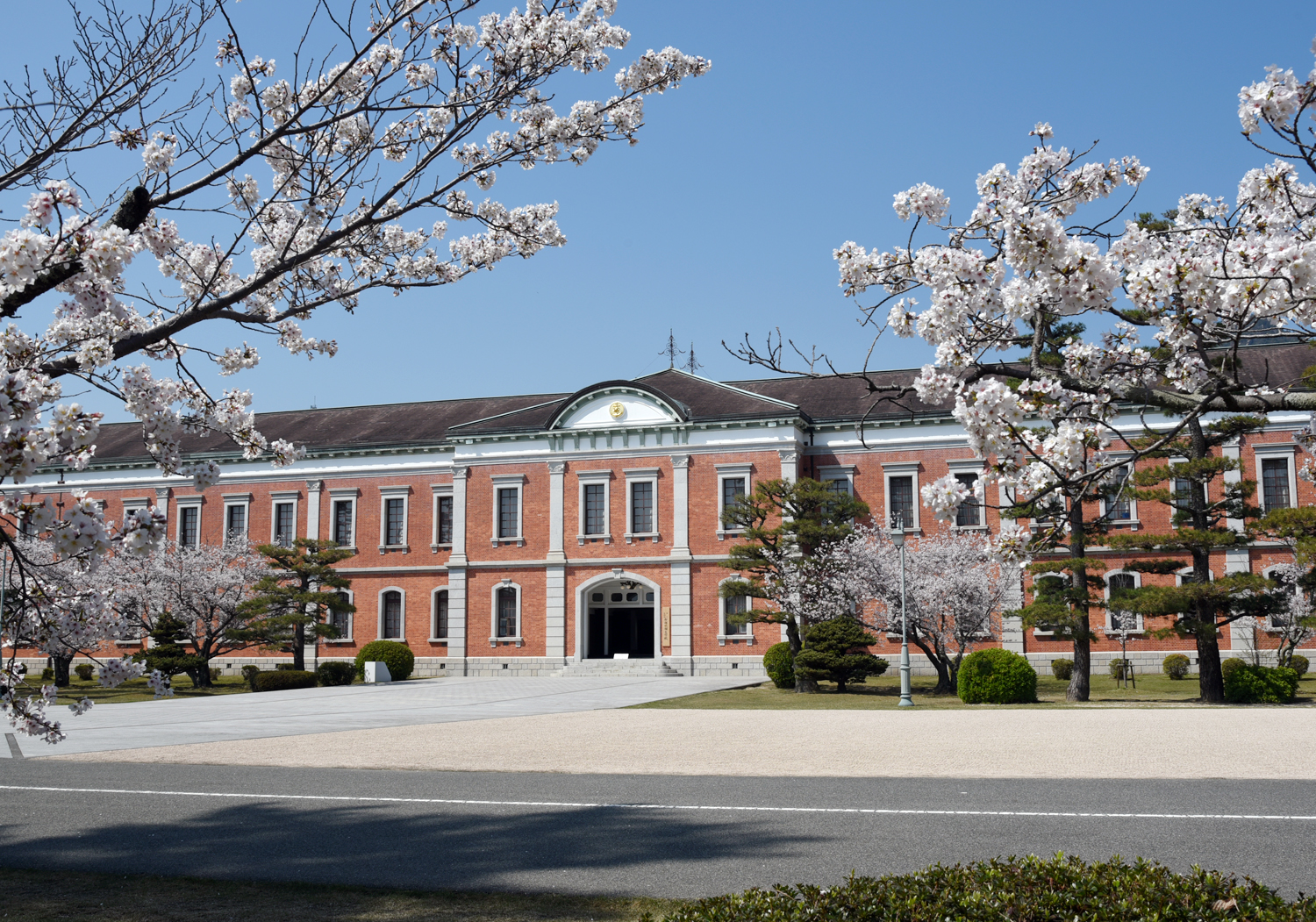
The building of Imperial Japanese Naval Academy.

The first steps to train a modern officer corps was the establishment of a naval academy. A facility was established in 1869 at Tsukiji in Tokyo and later relocated to Etajima in 1888, not far from Hiroshima on the Inland Sea. Members who originated from the coalition of the south western domains initially dominated the navy's small officer corps. This stranglehold over the officer corps was in large part, was reflective of the naval strength that had been accumulated by the various anti-Tokugawa domains. Beginning in 1870, the most powerful han (domains) with independent naval forces offered their vessels to the government, they did so on the condition that the officers and enlisted personnel who manned them would subsequently obtain positions and rank in the new navy. Since Satsuma, offered the three largest warships to the new government, it also provided more officers and enlisted sailors than any other domain.

In the initial recruitment of new cadets for the Naval Academy, the Hyōbushō (Military Ministry) drew heavily from bakumatsu-era precedents. Which was similar to the recruitment of cadets at the two Dutch-assisted bakufu naval training centers that had opened in 1855 and 1857, respectively, it continued a tribute system to secure cadets. Domains of the 17 original anti-bakufu coalition that possessed naval units, were ordered to provide cadets to the academy based on the size of their respective domains. Within this scheme, the larger political domains provided five students, and the smaller ones provided three each. As Chōshu, Satsuma, and Hizen were three of the most important naval domains, they sent the largest contingents. Furthermore, Satsuma officials also sent fourteen full-fee paying day students along with the five tribute students, giving their domain the largest single representation at the academy. However, quality did not match quantity, and as a result the first batch of students sent under the tribute system failed to impress either the academy authorities or officials in the Military Ministry. Of the original 114 students who attended the academy in 1870, only two remained for the full course and graduated in 1873, this dismal performance motivated the government to implement changes.

Japan's early naval leadership was aware of the severely limited economic and material resources of the country at the time, leading to initial priority given to the education and training of officers and men rather than to the acquisition of additional naval vessels. Conscious of the fact that officers could not be trained overnight, they set about a reorganization of the naval academy; viewing this as essential and realizing that this was a cost-effective means of establishing the foundations for a future navy. Therefore, after the first full year of subjects, the academy implemented a revised program to secure better recruits. As a first step, the government abolished the feudal recruitment and enrollment program which had been retained by the new government. Not only did such a system provide no quality control over cadets, but it also led to a continuation of regional identities among cadets and did little to cultivate the aura of a national navy.

In 1871, the government implemented a new policy for naval officer recruitment, one that had wide-ranging political, geographical, and social implications for the navy. First, the navy made enrollment contingent upon the successful completion of an entrance examination. Second, in order to attract anyone of outstanding intellectual ability and in an effort to make the navy a national service, the navy opened applications to anyone who desired a naval career regardless of their social or geographical origin. Although individuals of samurai background made up the vast majority of cadets in the early Meiji period, accounting for 90 percent of those who enrolled in 1874, the implementation of an examination-based entrance qualification led to a noticeable increase in officers of commoner background, who had been exposed to little or no previous military training. By 1891, commoners (heimin) accounted for just over 21 percent of the academy's graduates, a figure which would increase to 34 percent in 1901.

During an average course of four years, cadets at the Imperial Naval Academy were taught various subjects in naval science such as seamanship, navigation, and gunnery, as well as general education subjects. The training program stressed physical fitness and toughness and placed great emphasis on the traditional Japanese military values of loyalty, courtesy, valor, and simplicity.

=== Enlisted personnel ===
While the beginnings of a professional officer corps were being established, similar steps were taken to train the sailors and petty officers who would man the future navy. Unlike the army, the navy initially avoided using the universal conscription act of 1873, instead seeking to recruit volunteers rather than conscripts into its ranks. There was preference for those who already knew something of the sea, particularly for the sons of fishermen between the ages of 18 and 25. Later, as the navy grew, its enlisted personnel were drawn from both volunteers and conscripts. Of necessity, the initial training of navy enlisted personnel focused on instilling an esprit de corps that fostered patriotism and loyalty, while renewing traditional Japanese military virtues of courage and obedience.

After being recruited by local recruitment centers, the recruits were sent to Kaiheidan (海兵団) units in either of the four naval districts (Yokosuka, Kure, Sasebo and Maizuru) that were responsible for training of enlisted and non-commissioned officer personnel for the navy.

== Personnel scale of promotions ==
Prior to the Second World War, the three grades of seaman were third, second and first class. Petty officers were selected from among the first-class seamen, and were likewise graded from the third through the first classes. After a certain period, a first-class petty officer would be eligible for promotion to warrant officer. After five years of meritorious service as a warrant officer, he could be commissioned as a special-service officer in the rank of second (acting) sub-lieutenant. Such special-service officers could rise to the rank of special-service lieutenant-commander, which was usually the highest rank special-service officers commissioned from the ranks could achieve. (There are only four known instances where special-service officers attained the rank of special service commander while living, though at least three others achieving the rank posthumously after being killed in action.)

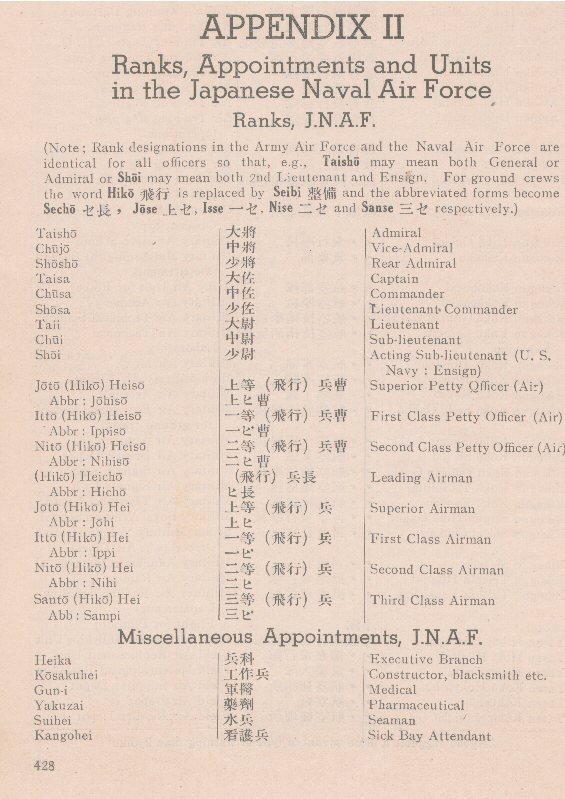
Imperial Japanese Navy ranks.

The majority of IJN officers were educated at and commissioned from the Imperial Naval Academy at Etajima. After passing out, line officers would receive further training at the Naval College, while those in a specialised branch (engineers, paymasters and fleet medical officers) would be sent to their respective college (Engineering, Intendants School and Surgery School). Graduates of universities or higher technical schools could also receive direct commissions as special-service officers in the non-combatant branches.

The promotion of officers in the IJN was by selection, with special promotions made at the discretion of a board of admirals. In peacetime, all officers passed out from Etajima as midshipmen, after which they would serve aboard a training ship for around a year. At the end of this period, they would receive commissions as second (acting) sub-lieutenants and enter either the Torpedo or Gunnery schools. After another 18 months, six of which would be spent in either the Torpedo or Gunnery Schools, they would be promoted to sub-lieutenants and serve as junior officers aboard a ship for a prescribed time. Following this, they would enter an advanced torpedo or gunnery programme and receive promotion to lieutenant two years after their promotion to sub-lieutenant. Line-service lieutenants of over four years in the service, including enrollment in programmes at the Naval War College (or a specialised higher school for those in non-executive branches), would typically be promoted to the rank of lieutenant-commander. For special-service midshipmen, promotion to second sub-lieutenant came after two years of service and after three years for the rank of sub-lieutenant. Special-service officers could be promoted to the rank of lieutenant-commander by special appointment.

After the rank of lieutenant-commander, promotion was highly competitive and solely by selection. Promotions to the ranks of commander through rear-admiral were typically scheduled in two-year intervals, though in practice, promotions to commander were made after five years at the rank of lieutenant-commander and promotions to captain made after four years as a commander. Promotions to rear-admiral usually came after five to six years as a captain, with promotions to vice-admiral coming after three years in the rank of rear-admiral. During wartime, promotion time limits were reduced by half. In general, vice-admiral was the highest regular rank an officer could achieve in the IJN. Promotion to the rank of full admiral was by direct Imperial appointment only, and came only to vice-admirals after long service or to those recognised for special merits. The ceremonial rank of marshal-admiral (fleet admiral) was also only by direct Imperial appointment, more in the nature of a special award than a substantive rank.

Posthumous promotions and commissions were also common, typically coming after the officer or sailor had been killed in action or had died after a long and distinguished career.

== See also ==
- Pilot training in the Imperial Japanese Navy
- Ranks of the Imperial Japanese Navy
- Kaiheidan
