= Sentō Takenaka =

Japanese Vice Admiral (1864–1919)

- 仙頭 武央
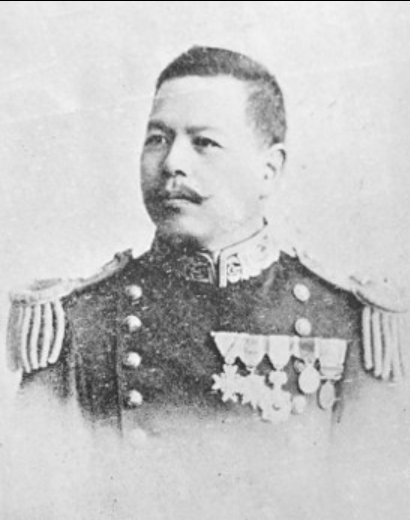
- Born: October 3, 1864; Anai, Tosa Province, Tokugawa
- Died: December 11, 1919 (aged 55); Tokyo, Tokyo Prefecture, Japan
- Burial place: Anai, Aki City, Kōchi Prefecture, Japan
- Alma mater: Imperial Japanese Naval Academy
- Military career
- Allegiance: Japan
- Branch: Imperial Japanese Navy
- Service years: 1883 – 1919
- Rank: Vice Admiral
- Commands: Tsushima; Naniwa; Kasuga; Yakumo; Suwo; Suzuya; Kaiheidan; Naval Gunnery School; Kure Special Naval Landing Force; Chinkai Guard District; Kure Reserve Fleet; Kure Naval Base Fleet
- Conflicts: First Sino-Japanese War; Russo-Japanese War; Battle of Korsakov; Battle of Tsushima
- Awards: Order of the Golden Kite, 4th Class; Order of the Rising Sun, 3rd Class

Sentō Takenaka (仙頭 武央, Sentō Takenaka; October 3, 1864 – December 11, 1919) was a Japanese naval officer of the First Sino-Japanese War and the Russo-Japanese War. He commanded the Japanese cruiser Tsushima during the Battle of Korsakov and the Battle of Tsushima and achieved the rank of vice admiral.

== Biography ==
Takenaka was born on 1864 at Anai Village (now Aki City), Aki District, Tosa Province. His father, Takehide, was a yakuyaku in Akimachi during the old clan era. He studied under Kusukichi Funamoto at Shingi Gakusha and graduated from the Imperial Japanese Naval Academy as part of its tenth class in October 1883, becoming an assistant lieutenant in the Imperial Japanese Navy. In April 1886, he was appointed as an ensign.

During the First Sino-Japanese War (1894–1895), he served aboard the cruiser Chiyoda. In July 1896, he became gunnery officer of the ironclad battleship Chin Yen, and then served as the deputy commander of the gunboat Pingyuan-go. In December 1897, he was promoted to lieutenant commander and assigned to the armored cruiser Asama and sent to the United Kingdom on an official trip. After duty as chief of gunnery on Asama, he was promoted to commander in October 1898.

In December 1898, he assumed the post of military construction supervisor and successively served as vice-commander of the protected cruiser Suma, the protected cruiser Naniwa, and the armored cruiser Yakumo. He then took on the role of a marine artillery instructor, marine inspector general, Kure Naval District outfitting committee, etc., in 1903. In October 1903 he took command of the protected cruiser Tsushima. Under his command, she took part during the Russo-Japanese War (1904–1905) in the Battle of Korsakov in August 1904 and the Battle of Tsushima in May 1905, and in January 1905 he was promoted to captain. In August 1905 he became commanding officer of Naniwa, and thereafter served as commanding officer of the armored cruiser Kasuga, Yakumo, the battleship Suwo, and the aviso Suzuya. In May 1908, he became commander of the Kaiheidan and successively served as commander of the Naval Gunnery School and commander of the Kure Special Naval Landing Force.

In December 1910, he was promoted to rear admiral and assumed the posts of commander of the Chinkai Guard District and head of the Temporary Building Department Branch. In December 1913 he became commander of the Kure Reserve Fleet and commander of the Kure Naval Base Fleet. On 1 December 1914 he was promoted to vice admiral and simultaneously was transferred to the reserves. He died on 11 December 11 1919 while living in Tokyo.

== Awards ==
- Order of the Golden Kite, 4th Class
- Order of the Rising Sun, 3rd Class with golden rays and neck ribbon

== Court Ranks ==
- July 8, 1886: Junior Eighth
- December 16, 1891: Junior Seventh
- October 31, 1898: Junior Sixth
- March 1, 1909: Senior Fifth
- March 10, 1914: Junior Fourth
- January 11, 1915: Senior Fourth
