= Shigeyoshi Inoue =

Japanese admiral (1889–1975)

- 井上 成美
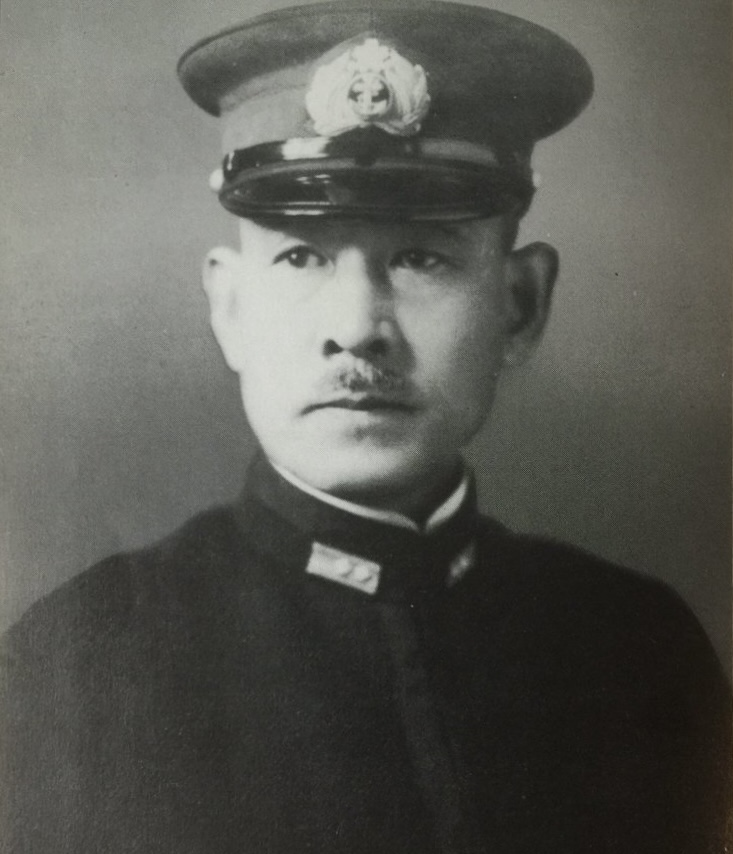
- Born: December 9, 1889; Sendai, Miyagi, Japan
- Died: December 15, 1975 (aged 86); Yokosuka, Kanagawa, Japan
- Military career
- Allegiance: Empire of Japan
- Branch: Imperial Japanese Navy
- Service years: 1909–1945
- Rank: Admiral
- Commands: Hiei, Naval Affairs Bureau, Naval Aviation Bureau, 4th Fleet, Naval Academy, Naval Construction Bureau, Naval Councillor
- Conflicts: World War II; Pacific War; Battle of Wake Island; Battle of the Coral Sea
- Awards: Order of the Rising Sun (1st class)
- Other work: Vice-Minister of the Navy

Shigeyoshi Inoue (井上 成美, Inoue Shigeyoshi; December 9, 1889 – December 15, 1975) was an admiral in the Imperial Japanese Navy during World War II. He was commander of the Japanese 4th Fleet and later served as Vice-Minister of the Navy. A noted naval theorist, he was a strong advocate of naval aviation within the Japanese Navy. General (Prime Minister) Nobuyuki Abe was his brother-in-law.

== Biography ==
=== Early life ===
Shigeyoshi Inoue was born on December 9, 1889, in Sendai, Miyagi Prefecture, the eleventh son of a vineyard owner and former samurai retainer Kanori Inoue. His name Shigeyoshi, consisting of the kanji 成 (to achieve) and 美 (beauty), was derived from a passage in Analects by Yan Hui saying "The Master said, the man of virtue seeks to achieve the beautiful qualities of men and does not seek to achieve their bad qualities. The small man does the opposite of this." Shigeyoshi, who was taught by his father to become a man like this, took great pride in this name.

=== Early career ===
Inoue attended the 37th class of the Imperial Japanese Naval Academy, graduating second out of a class of 179 cadets in 1909. As a midshipman, he was assigned to the cruiser Soya on its 1909 cruise from Dairen to Chemulpo, Chinkai, Sasebo and Tsu. He stayed with Soya on its cruise the following year to Manila, Ambon, Townsville, Brisbane, Sydney, Hobart, Melbourne, Fremantle, Batavia, Singapore, Hong Kong, Makung, and Keelung. On his return, he was assigned to the battleship Mikasa, and then the cruiser Kasuga.

=== Overseas experience ===
Shortly after his promotion to ensign on December 15, 1910, he was reassigned to the cruiser Kurama and attended the coronation ceremonies for King George V in London in 1911. In 1912, he returned to school to study latest naval artillery and submarine warfare techniques and was promoted to sub-lieutenant at the end of that year. In 1913, he served on the cruiser Takachiho, followed by the battleship Hiei. He was promoted to lieutenant at the end of 1915, and transferred to the battleship Fusō. Although Fusō participated in operations in World War I against the Imperial German Navy, Inoue was not in any combat situations.

At the end of 1918, Inoue was appointed military attaché to Switzerland, and ordered by the Navy to learn German. In 1919, he was part of the Japanese diplomatic delegation to the Paris Peace Conference, where this knowledge proved to be useful. In 1920, he was appointed military attaché to France, and was then ordered to learn French. In December 1921, he received a promotion to lieutenant commander, and was permitted to return to Japan.

After serving as executive officer on the Suma in 1923, Inoue enrolled in the Naval Staff College, graduating 3rd in a class of 21 the following year from the 22nd class. On December 1, 1925, he was promoted to commander. Inoue remained in staff positions for the next several years, including an appointment as naval attaché to Italy from 1927 to 1929, after which he was promoted to captain.

=== As Admiral ===
On November 15, 1933, Inoue was given command of Hiei. However, his administrative talents could not be overlooked, and he returned to shore duties after slightly over a year and a half.

Promoted to rear admiral on November 15, 1935, Inoue was made vice commander of the IJN 3rd Fleet, which covered the China theater of operations in 1939 and further promoted to vice admiral the same year.

Inoue was a protégé of Admiral Isoroku Yamamoto, and was strongly opposed to the Tripartite Pact with Fascist Italy and Nazi Germany. As with Yamamoto, he was a strong proponent of naval aviation. Inoue was awarded the Order of the Rising Sun (first class) in 1940.

In 1940, Inoue became commander of the Imperial Japanese Navy Aviation Bureau, and submitted his thesis for a radical restructuring of the Imperial Japanese Navy to Naval Minister Koshirō Oikawa early in 1941. He was highly critical of the Navy's shipbuilding programme, with its emphasis on battleships over aircraft carriers. Inoue was given command of the IJN Fourth Fleet later the same year, based out of Truk. He was thus in command of Japanese naval forces during the Battle of Guam and Battle of Wake Island. He subsequently relocated his headquarters to Rabaul for Operation Mo, intended to occupy Port Moresby. However, after the Japanese defeat at the Battle of the Coral Sea in May 1942, Admiral Isoroku Yamamoto deemed him insufficiently aggressive, and relieved him of his command in October, but allowed him to save face and had him return to Japan to become commander of the Imperial Japanese Naval Academy. He became Vice Minister of the Navy in the closing stages of World War II, was promoted to full admiral on May 15, 1945 (one of the last two promotions made to this rank), and officially retired on October 15 of the same year.

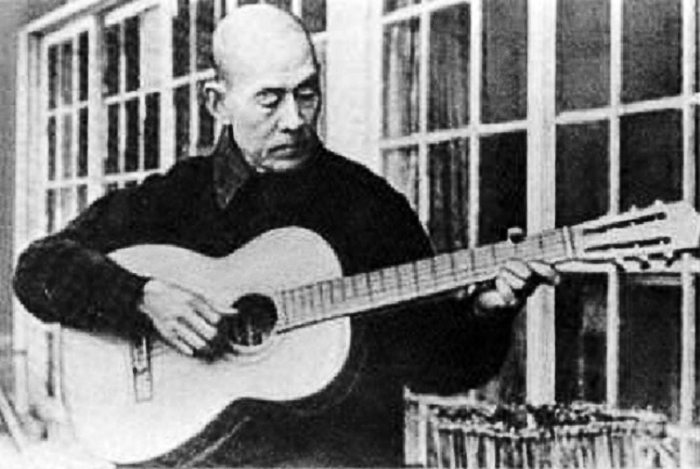
Inoue playing guitar

After the war, Inoue became an English and music teacher to children at his house in Yokosuka. The site of his home is now a public park. However, this site was closed due to the 2011 Tohoku Earthquake.

His grave is at Tama Cemetery in Fuchū, Tokyo, Japan.

IJN Insignia	Rank	Date
	海軍少将 Kaigun Shōshō (Rear-Admiral)	November 15, 1935
	海軍中将 Kaigun Chūjō (Vice-Admiral)	November 15, 1939
	海軍大将 Kaigun Taishō (Admiral)	May 15, 1945

Military offices
Preceded by Sata Kenichi	Hiei; Commanding Officer; November 15, 1933 – August 1, 1935	Succeeded by Ōkawachi Denshichi
Preceded by Izawa Haruma	Yokosuka Naval District; Chief-of-staff; November 15, 1935 – November 16, 1936	Succeeded by Iwamura Seiichi
Preceded by Toyoda Soemu	Naval Affairs Bureau; Director; October 20, 1937 – October 18, 1939	Succeeded by Kusaka Jinichi
Preceded by Kusaka Jinichi	3rd Fleet; Chief-of-staff; October 23, 1939 – November 15, 1939	Succeeded by Disbanded
Preceded by Kusaka Jinichi	China Area Fleet; Chief-of-staff; October 23, 1939 – October 1, 1940	Succeeded by Ōkawachi Denshichi
Preceded by Toyoda Teijirō	Naval Aviation Bureau; Director; October 1, 1940 – August 11, 1941	Succeeded by Katagiri Eikichi
Preceded by Takasu Shirō	4th Fleet; Commander-in-chief; August 11, 1941 – October 26, 1942	Succeeded by Samejima Tomoshige
Preceded by Kusaka Jinichi	Naval Academy; Headmaster; October 26, 1942 – August 5, 1944	Succeeded by Ōkawachi Denshichi
Political offices
Preceded by Oka Takazumi	Vice-Minister of the Navy; August 5, 1944 – May 15, 1945	Succeeded by Tada Takeo
Military offices
Preceded by Sugiyama Rokuzō	Naval Construction Bureau; Director; November 4, 1944 – November 18, 1944	Succeeded by Shibuya Ryūtarō
Preceded by Totsuka Michitarō	Naval Aviation Bureau; Director; May 1, 1945 – May 15, 1945	Succeeded by Wada Misao
