= First Beach =

Japanese transportation company

First Beach 株式会社ファーストビーチ
- Type: Public
- Industry: Transportation, tourism
- Headquarters: Hiroshima, Hiroshima, Japan
- Website: www.setonaikaikisen.co.jp/main2.html

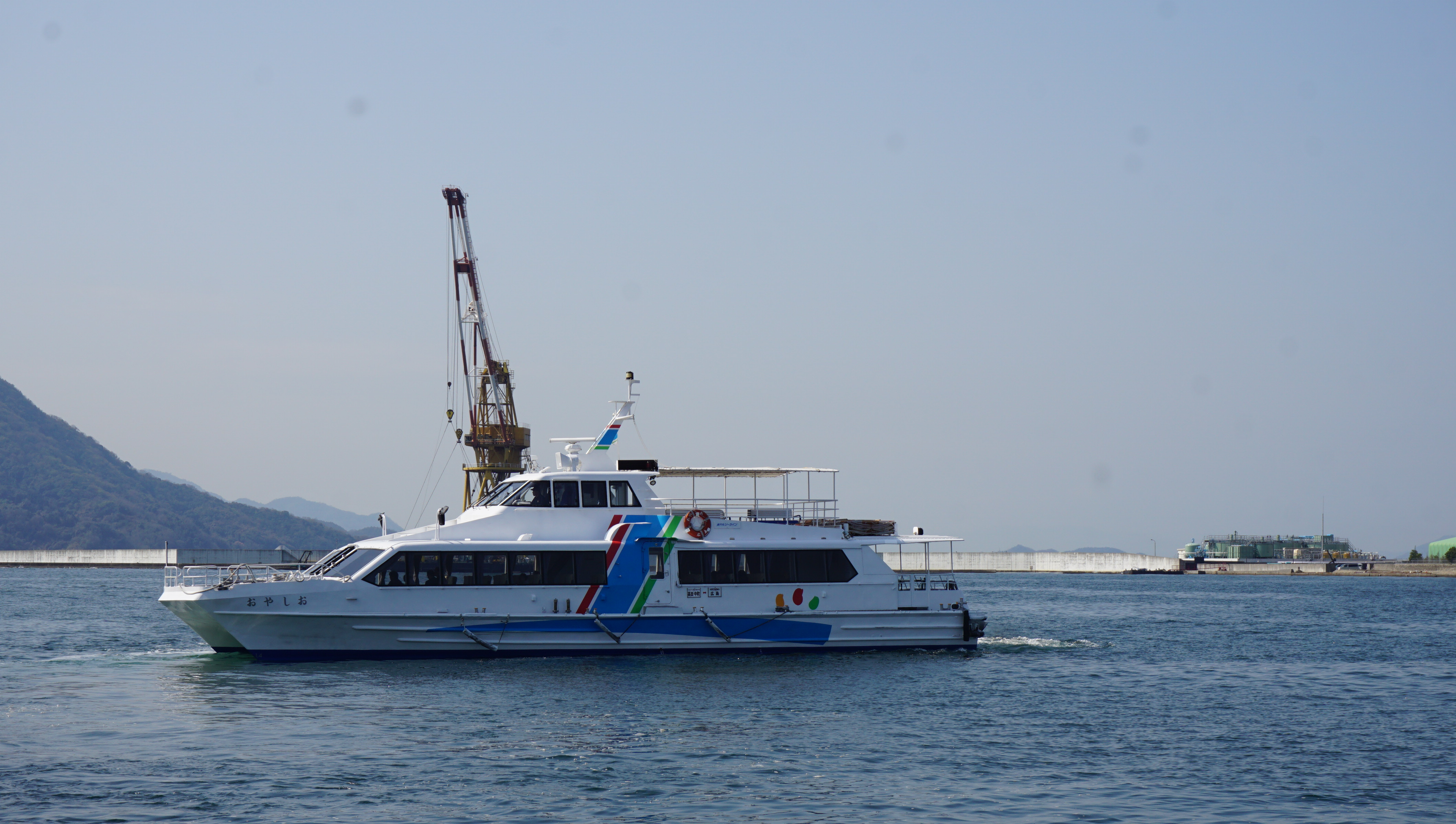
First Beach ferry leaving Hiroshima Port.

First Beach (株式会社ファーストビーチ, Kabushiki-gaisha Fāsuto Bīchi) is a Japanese transportation/tourism company based in Hiroshima, Japan.

== Ferries ==
- Ujina Port - Etajima
- Kure Port - Etajima
- Hiroshima Port - Matsuyama

== Hydrofoils ==
- Hiroshima Port - Hiroshima Prince Hotel - Kannon - Miyajima
- Ujina Port - Hiroshima Prince Hotel - Etajima

== Cruising ==
- Hiroshima Port - Etajima
- Kure - Kure
