= Miyajima, Hiroshima =

Miyajima 宮島町
- Town
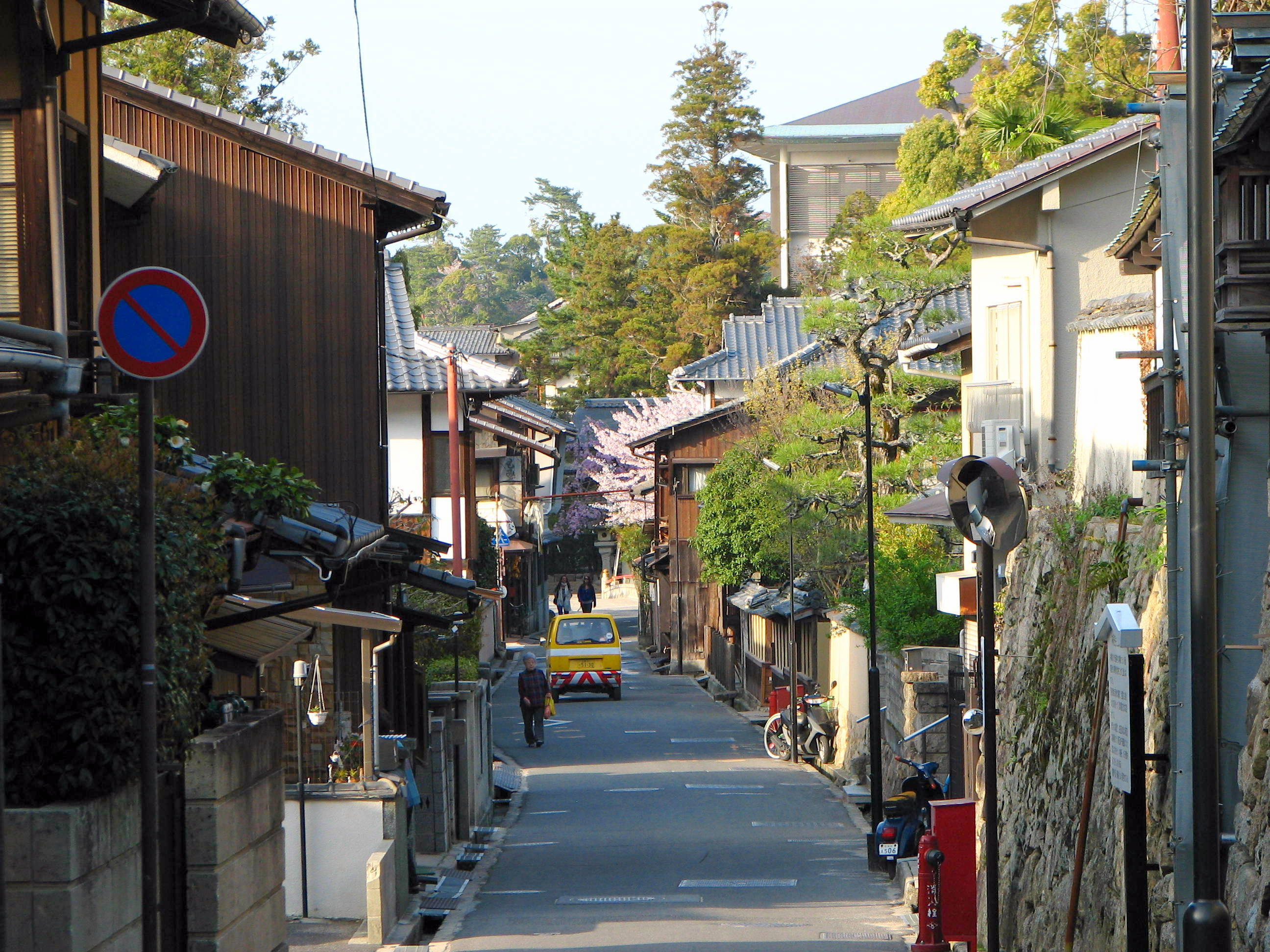
- Miyajima-chō

- Flag Emblem
- Interactive map of Miyajima
- Country: Japan
- Prefecture: Hiroshima
- District: Saeki
- Merged: November 3, 2005 (now part of Hatsukaichi)

Area
  - Total: 30.39 km^{2} (11.73 sq mi)

Population (2019)
  - Total: 1,564
  - Density: 51.56/km^{2} (133.5/sq mi)
- Time zone: UTC+09:00 (JST)

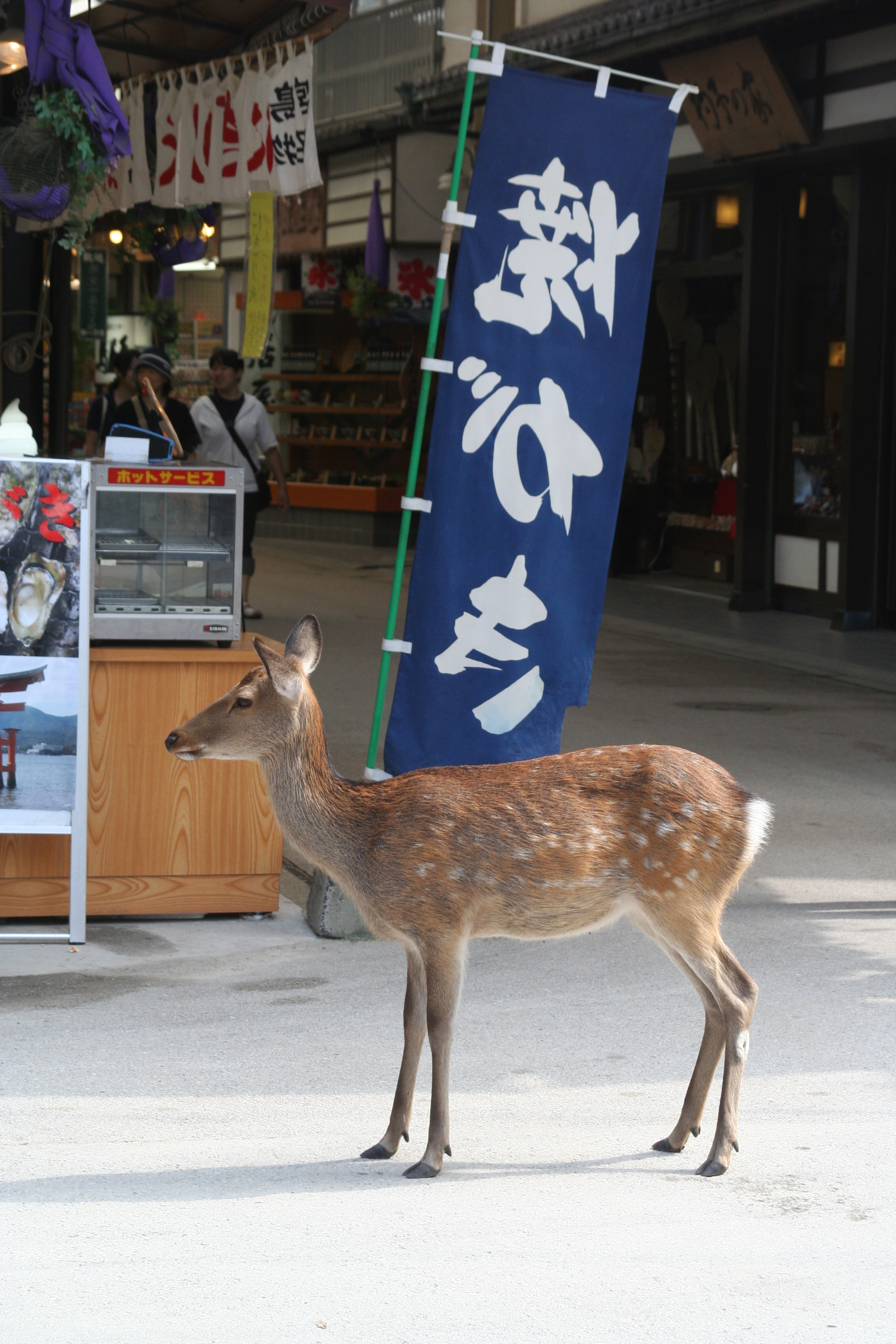
A tame Sika deer wandering the streets of Miyajima.

Miyajima (宮島町, Miyajima-chō) was a town located on the island of Itsukushima in Saeki District, Hiroshima Prefecture, Japan.

As of 2019, the town had an estimated population of 1,564 and a density of 51.46 persons per km^{2}. The total area was 30.39 km^{2}.

== Merger with Hatsukaichi ==
During a nationwide wave of municipal consolidations in the early 2000s (known as the Great Heisei Mergers), small towns were encouraged or required to merge with larger neighboring cities to streamline local governance and reduce administrative costs.

Both the neighboring city of Hatsukaichi and the major city of Hiroshima competed to absorb Miyajima. After the 2004 local referendum where residents voted with a slim majority in favor of Hatsukaichi – 56.3%, representing a difference of 206 votes – the town was formally amalgamated into Hatsukaichi City on November 3, 2005, along with the town of Ōno.
