= Yoshiwa, Hiroshima =

Dissolved municipality in Hiroshima prefecture, Japan

Yoshiwa (吉和村, Yoshiwa-mura) was a village located in Saeki District, Hiroshima Prefecture, Japan.

On March 1, 2003, Yoshiwa, along with the town of Saeki (also from Saeki District), was merged into the expanded city of Hatsukaichi.
