= Pilot training in the Imperial Japanese Navy =

Pilot training in the Imperial Japanese Navy (IJN) had several programs, which expanded, evolved and changed throughout the years. The aim of these programs was to train aircrew for the Imperial Japanese Navy Air Service (IJNAS). Initially, the pilot training program was open only to officers who graduated from the Imperial Japanese Naval Academy. However, the training was extended to include non-commissioned officers (NCO) in March 1914 and eventually also to enlisted navy personnel in May 1920. Over the years, the number of NCO and enlisted pilots significantly surpassed the number of commissioned officer pilots, and officers would typically only command units (as Buntaichō or Hikōtaichō) and lead formations in combat. As the Pacific War progressed and attrition impacted the units, it was not uncommon for NCOs to lead battle formations due to the lack of officers, and some units even ended up without officers, as in the case of 204th Air Group in summer 1943 after Operation SE. Prior to the Pacific war, the training programs were extremely selective and competitive, and produced only a small number of elite pilots every year. However, during the Pacific War, a rapid increase in the demand for replacement pilots significantly reduced the selectiveness and training time.

== Officer pilot training programs ==
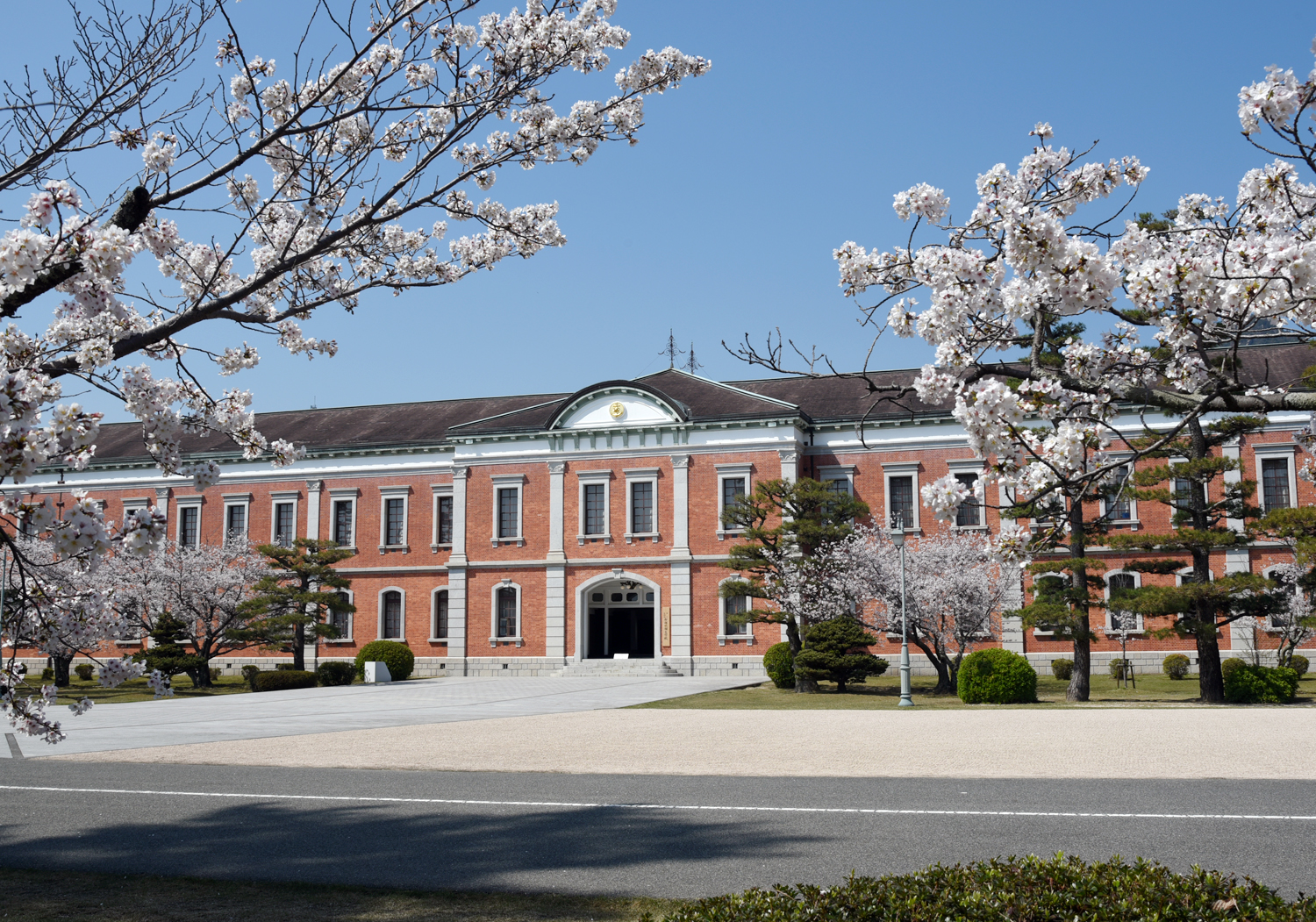
Officer pilot candidates were selected among the graduates of the Imperial Japanese Naval Academy.

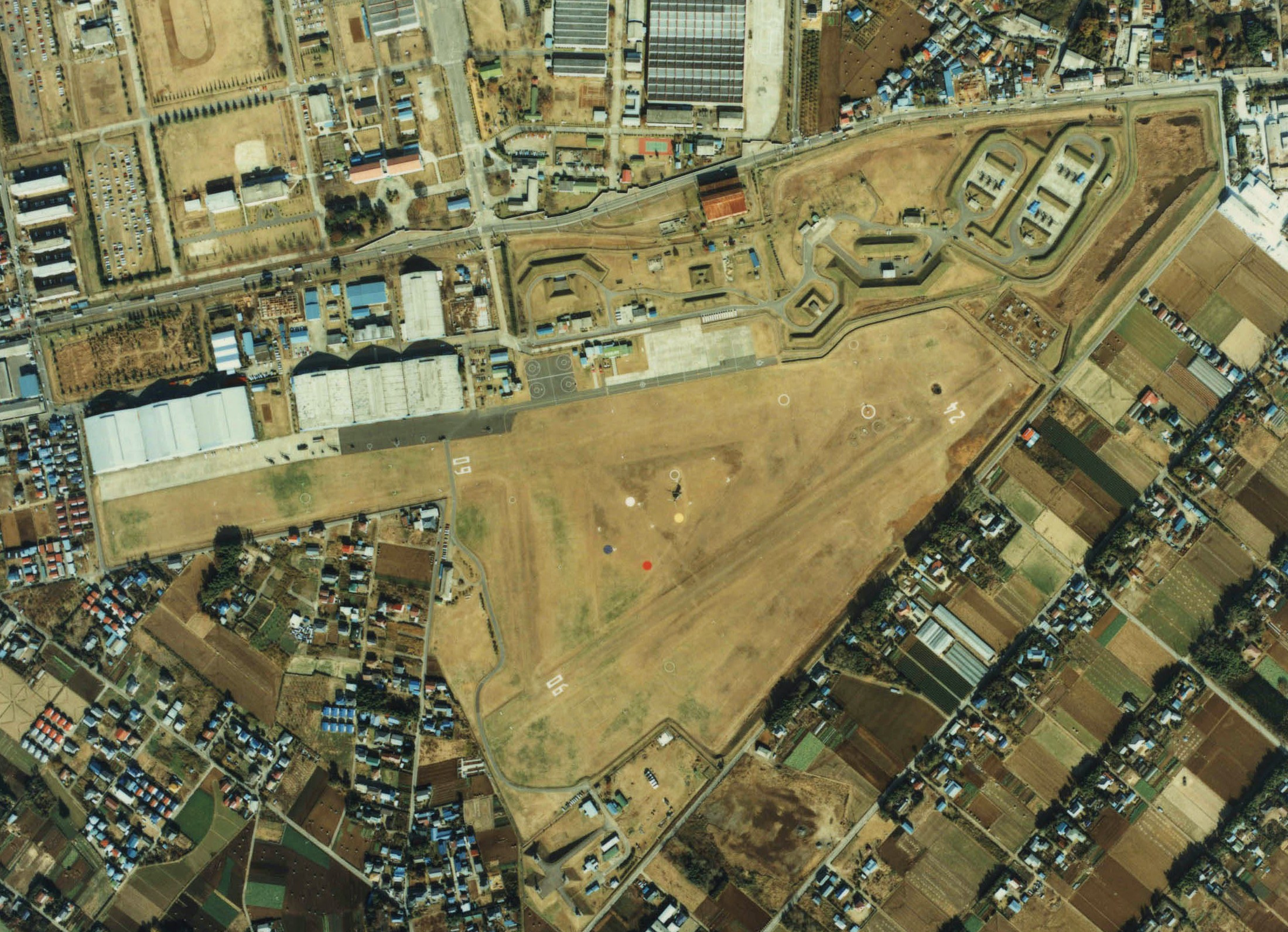
Kasumigaura Airfield was one of the main training centers for navy pilots.

Graduates of the Imperial Japanese Naval Academy would first serve as midshipmen for a year before being commissioned as ensigns. Newly-commissioned ensigns were selected for pilot training based on the results of an aptitude test (適性検査 Tekisei kensa) that typically lasted three weeks and took place at Kasumigaura Airfield. After the officers were selected for flight training, they would first receive one month of training in a two-seater aircraft with an instructor. Normally the first solo flight would be flown after twelve to thirteen logged hours of dual flight time. After passing the solo flight, they would proceed with more advanced flight training for the next several months. The whole course took about nine months, and after its completion, the graduates were assigned to a specific aircraft role (fighters, dive bombers, torpedo bombers, land-based bombers or seaplanes) and were sent to various air groups for specialized type training. By the time an officer pilot was posted to his combat unit he would be a lieutenant (junior grade).

In November 1934 the Air Reserve Student (航空予備学生 Kōkū Yobi Gakusei) program was created, which enabled male civilian university and college graduates to enter pilot training (Note: There was a preceding reserve program (予備将校航空術講習員 Yobi-shōkō Kōkū-jutsu Kōshū-in) that drew students from merchant marine colleges and lasted for only two classes, starting in May 1933 and January 1934, respectively. The students from this program were transferred from Reserve Ensign to Regular Ensign on 1 August 1934. Among its graduates were several prominent air group leaders (Hikōtaichō) during the Pacific War, such as: Fumito Inoue (2nd Air Group), Tomoo Nakamura (Misawa Air Group), Miyoshi Nabeta (Kisarazu Air Group) and Shigemi Wada (Tōkō Air Group).). The candidates had to be under the age of 26 in the case of a university degree and under the age of 24 in the case of a college degree. After successful completion of the training, the candidates were commissioned as ensigns. However, the officers from this program were distinguished from the academy graduates by their titles; academy graduates were called "Officers" (将校 Shōkō), while university and college graduates were called "Reserve Officers" (予備将校 Yobi Shōkō). The reserve student program remained very limited for many years, with the first class comprising only five students and the eighth class in 1941 only 48 students. The program was only significantly expanded after the war situation grew worse for Japan in 1943.

To distinguish officer pilot trainees from NCO and enlisted trainees, they were called "Flight Students" (飛行学生 Hikō Gakusei), as opposed to "Flight Trainee" (飛行練習生 Hikō Renshū-sei) used for NCO and enlisted trainees.

== NCO and Enlisted pilot training programs ==
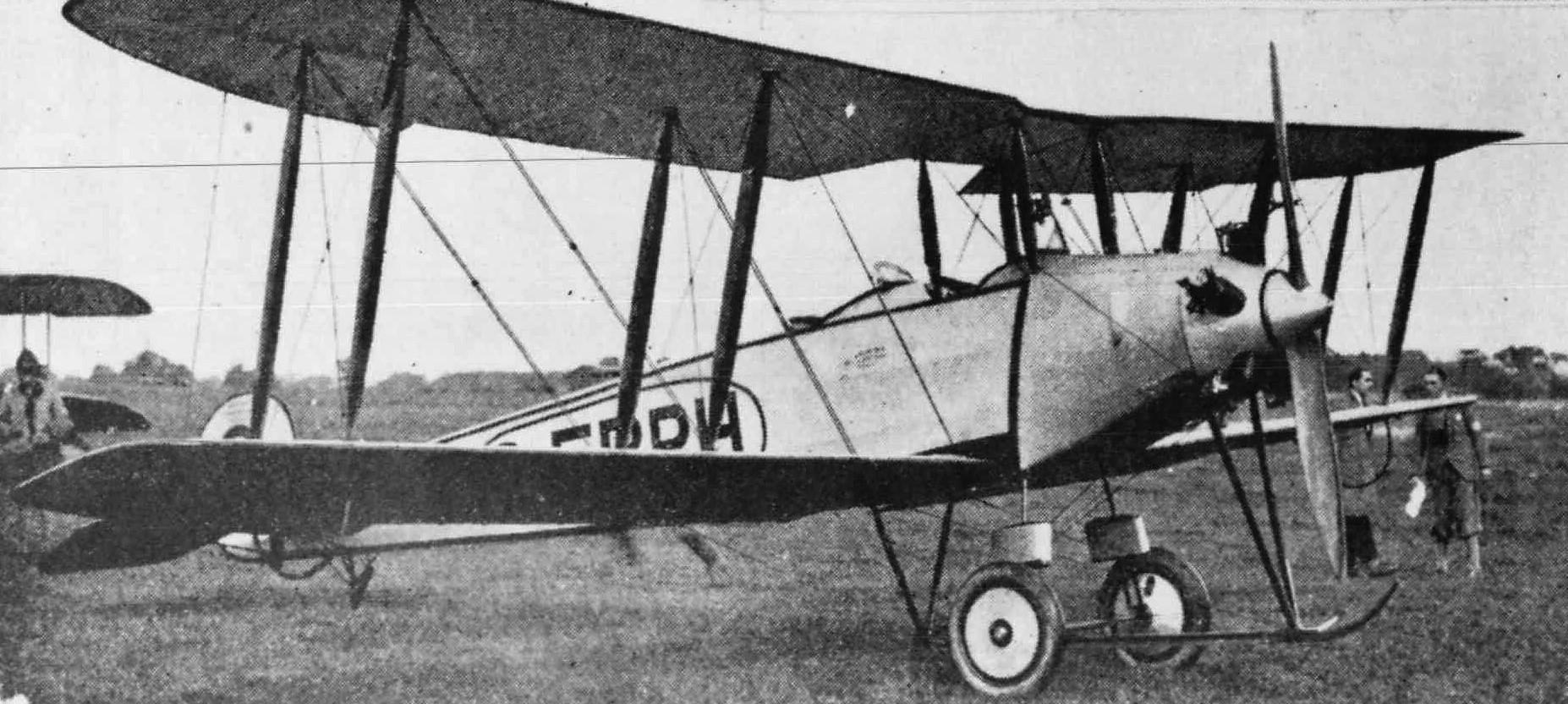
Yokosuka K2Y (Type 3 Primary Trainer) was the standard primary trainer aircraft, which was a version of British Avro 504.

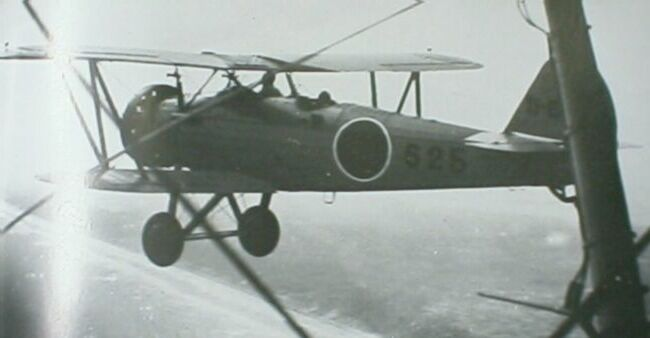
Yokosuka K5Y (Type 93 Intermediate Trainer) was the standard intermediate trainer aircraft, which was affectionately referred to as Akatombo (赤とんぼ) or red dragonfly.

Prior to June 1930, the NCO and enlisted pilot training program was called Flying Technique Trainee (飛行術練習生 Hikō-jutsu Renshū-sei) program. After that date, the program was renamed to Pilot Trainee (操縦練習生 Sōjū Renshū-sei) program, which was typically shortened to Sōren (操練) for practical use. The trainees were selected from the personnel already serving in the navy based on a competitive written exam and then further through rigorous physical and flight aptitude tests. The flight training took place at Kasumigaura Airfield. Same as the officer pilot students, NCO/enlisted pilot trainees were normally allowed to go for the first solo after one month of flight training with an instructor.

In 1928, a new parallel program was created to enable also civilian population to enter the training directly, which was called Flight Reserve Trainee Program (飛行予科練習生 Hikō Yoka Renshū-sei) program or Yokaren (予科練) for short. The first class began their training in June 1930. Yokaren program drew from male civilians aged from 15-17 and made the selection through a competitive written exam. Selected candidates then went through three-year training that involved basic education and learning of various naval skills. Due to the increased demand for pilots, the training duration was afterwards shortened to two and a half years during the Second Sino-Japanese War and to two years during the Pacific War. On the other hand, since Sōren program candidates were older and already received basic education in the navy through Kaiheidan (海兵団) units, the program progressed quickly to the actual flight training, thus lasting only about a year in total.

Major changes to the NCO and enlisted programs were made in May 1937. A new program aimed at civilians between age 16-19 was added and named A-Class Flight Reserve Trainee (甲飛行予科練習生 Kō Hikō Yoka Renshū-sei) program. Due to the higher education level of candidates at the entry into the program, the training only lasted one year and a half in total (later shortened to one year). To follow suit, the original Yokaren program was renamed to B-Class Flight Reserve Trainee (乙飛行予科練習生 Otsu Hikō Yoka Renshū-sei) program, where B-Class indicated the lower age of candidates at the entry compared to A-Class. In October 1940, Sōren was also renamed to C-Class Flight Reserve Trainee (丙飛行予科練習生 Hei Hikō Yoka Renshū-sei) to fit into the same system.

The flight training part of the programs was called Flight Trainee (飛行練習生 Hikō Renshū-sei) or Hiren (飛練) for short, and lasted for about seven months: 2 months in a primary trainer aircraft (typically Yokosuka K2Y) and 5 months in an intermediate trainer aircraft (typically Yokosuka K5Y). After the introduction of classes, the flight training was standardised for all classes. Same as the officer pilot students, the NCO and enlisted pilot trainees were at the end of the course sent to various air groups to specialise in a specific role: fighter, dive bomber, torpedo bomber, land-based bomber or seaplane. The specialisation was called Extended Education (延長教育 Enchō Kyōiku) and took from five to six months, depending on the role.

== Carrier operation training program ==
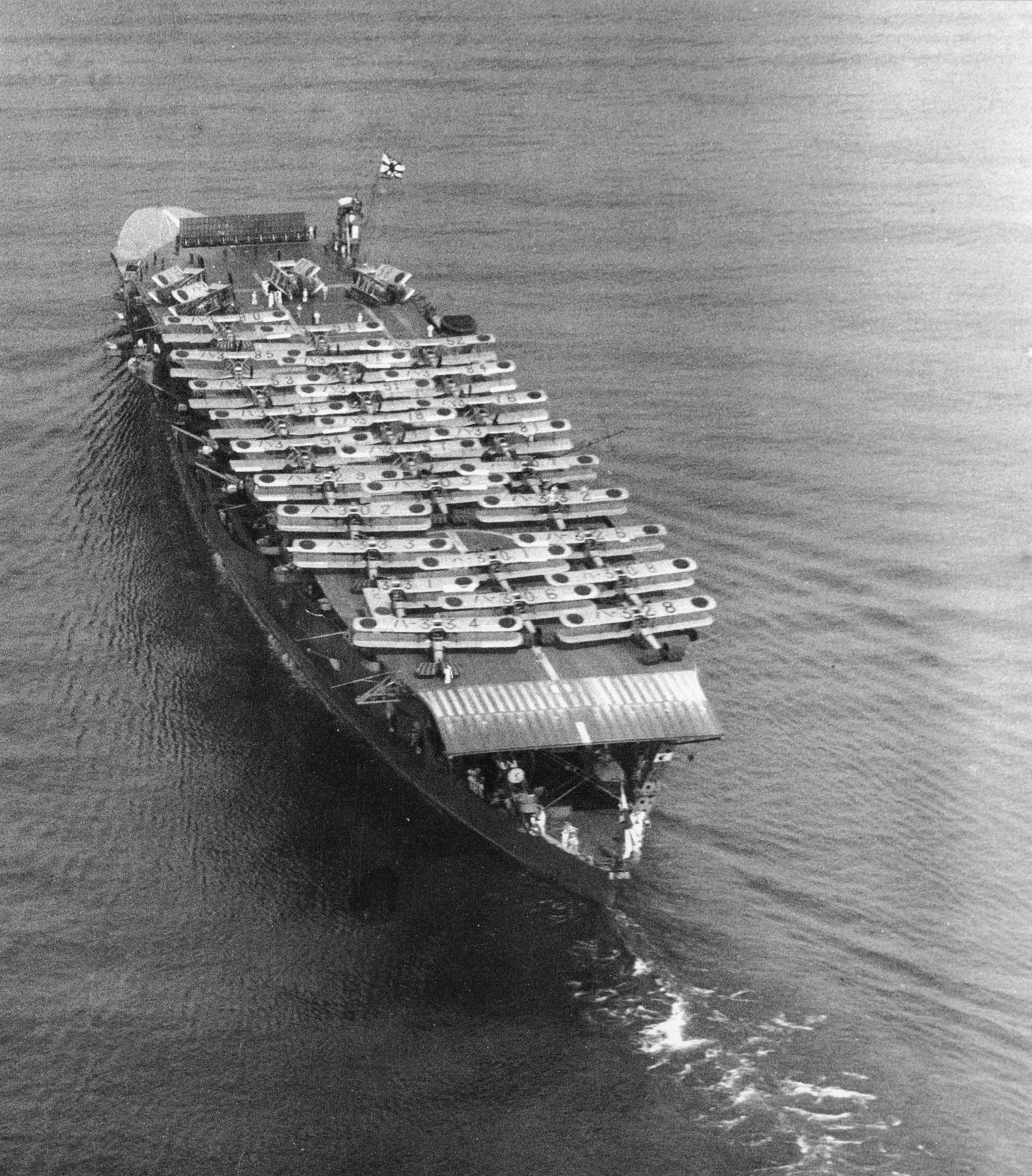
Pilots obtained the carrier qualification with one of the carriers (Akagi pictured).

Pilots assigned to aircraft carrier squadrons underwent an intense training program to master carrier landing technique and obtain the carrier qualification. Prior to the Second Sino-Japanese War, only veteran pilots with 500 hours or more flight time were assigned to a carrier duty. However, in 1938 this was relaxed in order to follow the increased demand for carrier-qualified pilots, and thus even pilots fresh from the Extended Education program were assigned directly to a carrier duty. The training program started on a land airfield within a restricted area marked by white canvas markers that represented a carrier flight deck and took about one to two months. The next stage was mastering the approach on an actual carrier at sea, where the pilots would perform go-around without touching the flight deck. When the approach was mastered, the pilots were permitted to do touch-and-gos. Finally, the last step was training an actual carrier landing using arresting gear.

== See also ==
- Imperial Japanese Navy Air Service
- Ranks of the Imperial Japanese Navy
- Recruitment in the Imperial Japanese Navy
- Kaiheidan
