= Ranks of the Imperial Japanese Navy =

The Ranks of the Imperial Japanese Navy were the rank insignia of the Imperial Japanese Navy, used from its creation in 1868, until its dissolution in 1945 following the Surrender of Japan in World War II. The ranks were inspired by the ranks of the Royal Navy.

The officer rank names were used for both the Imperial Japanese Army and Imperial Japanese Navy, the only distinction being the placement of the word Rikugun (army) or Kaigun (navy) before the rank. Thus, for example, a captain in the navy shared the same rank designation as that of a colonel in the army: Taisa (colonel), so the rank of Rikugun Taisa denoted an army colonel, while the rank of Kaigun Taisa denoted a naval captain.

== Commissioned officer ranks ==
=== Ranks ===
All commissioned officer rank names were the same as their army counterparts. The navy would prefix the common rank names with "navy" (Japanese: 海軍, romanized: Kaigun), while the army would prefix them with "army" (Japanese: 陸軍, romanized: Rikugun). There was a minor difference in pronunciation of character 大 for Navy Lieutenant and Navy Captain. The navy pronounced it as Dai, while the army pronounced it as Tai. However, this pronunciation difference was not officially enacted.

Regular Officers (Japanese: 将校, romanized: Shōkō) were graduates of the Imperial Japanese Naval Academy. Reserve Officers (Japanese: 予備将校, romanized: Yobi-shōkō) were university or college graduates, as opposed to going through the naval academy. Special Duty Officers (Japanese: 特務士官, romanized: Tokumu-shikan) were the officers with the rank of Lieutenant or below, who were promoted from the rank of Warrant Officer (starting from the enlisted ranks). Typically the ranks discriminated in a way that the priority of taking command for Special Duty Officers was lower than that of Regular Officers or Reserve Officers. (Note: Navy Land Forces and some Naval Air Service used to neglect this system to focus more on the rank itself, regardless of Reserve or Special Duty Officer status.) The distinction between Special Duty Officers and Regular/Reserve Officers was also highlighted in the rank insignia (see the table for details).

The rank Commodore was not established but the Captain who was commanding the central ship in the fleet, usually close to being promoted to the rank of Rear Admiral, or acting as the unit commander (which was usually held by a Rear Admiral) nominally became a flag officer by raising the "Commodore Flag".

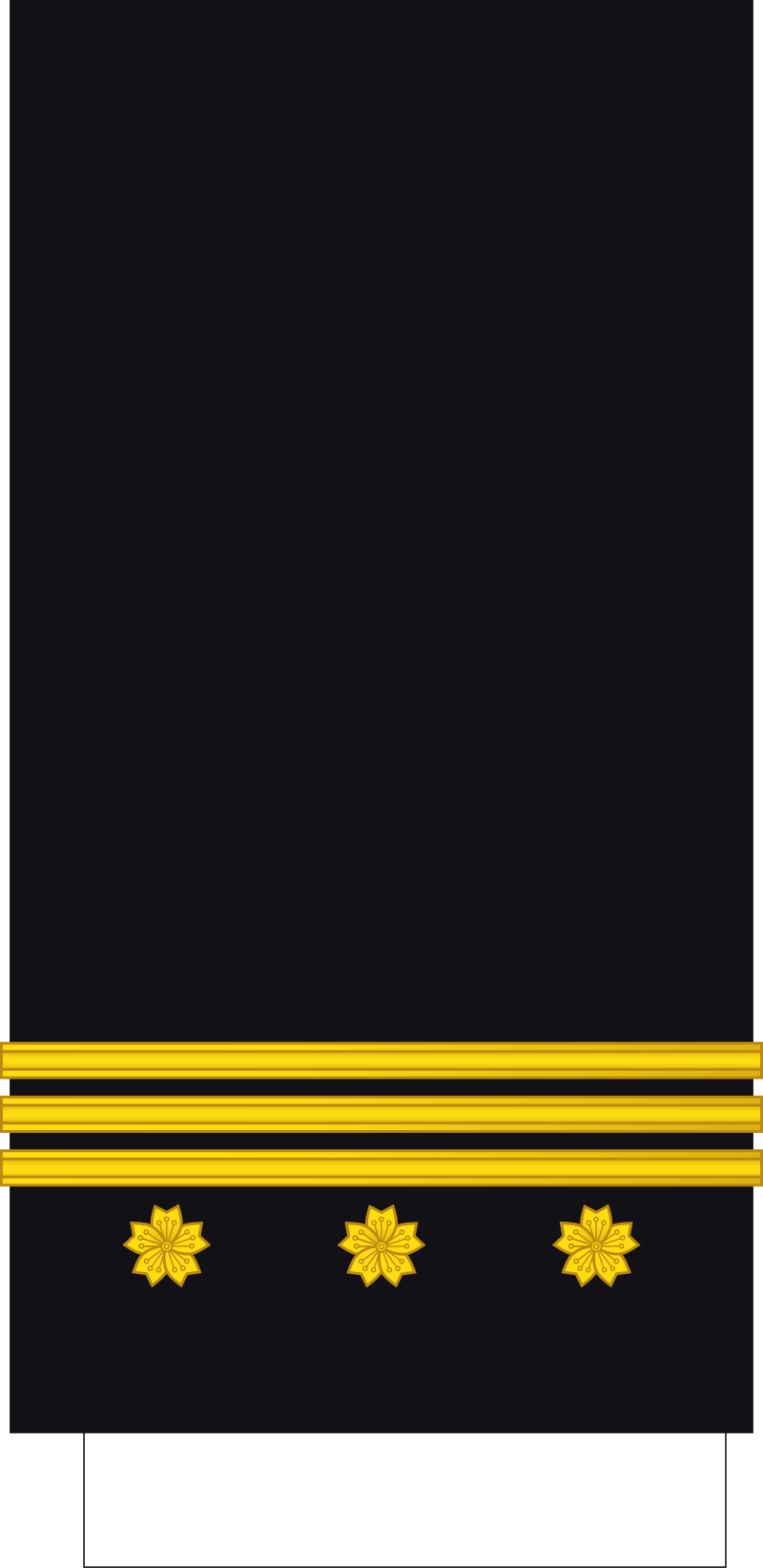
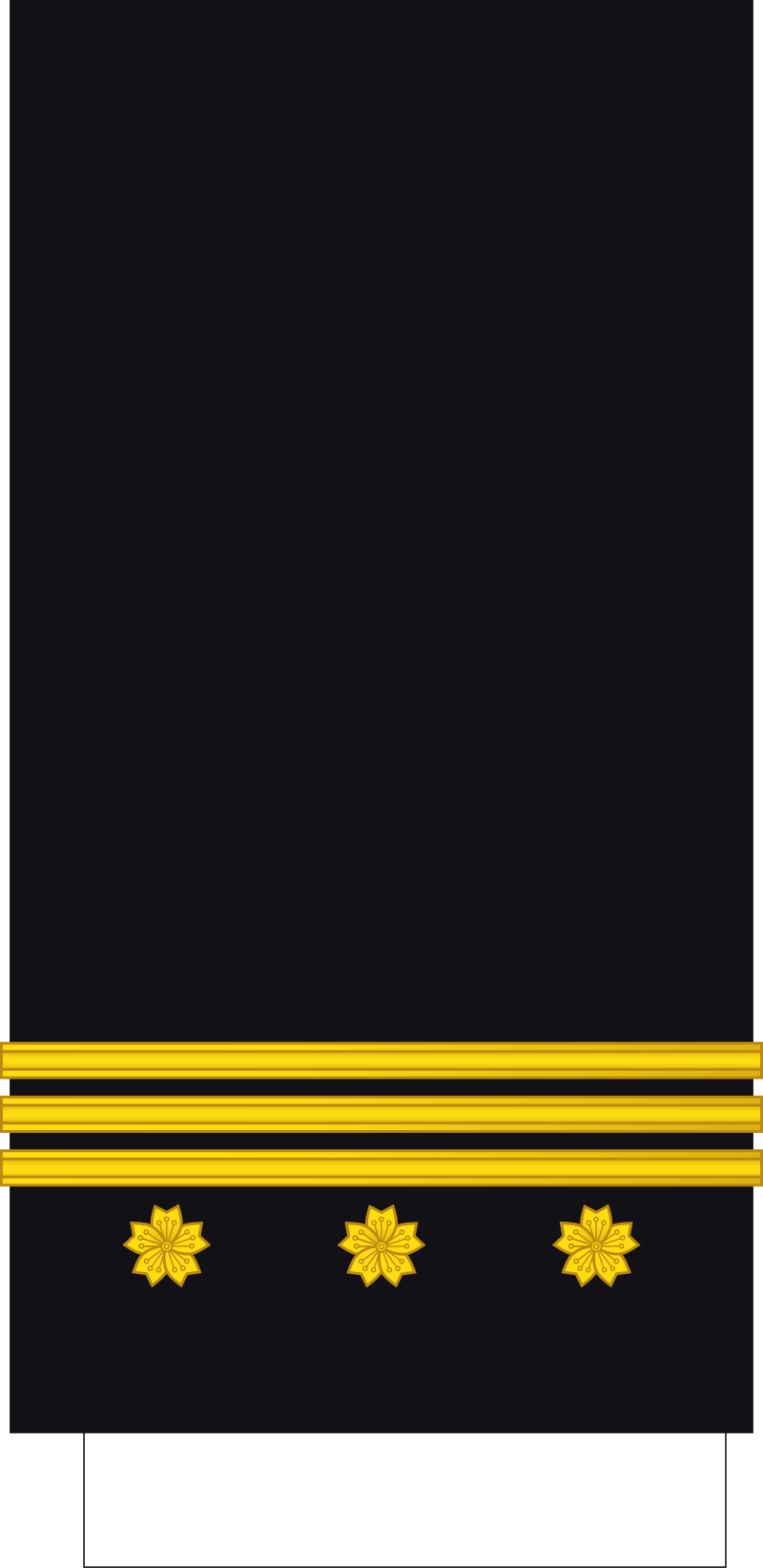
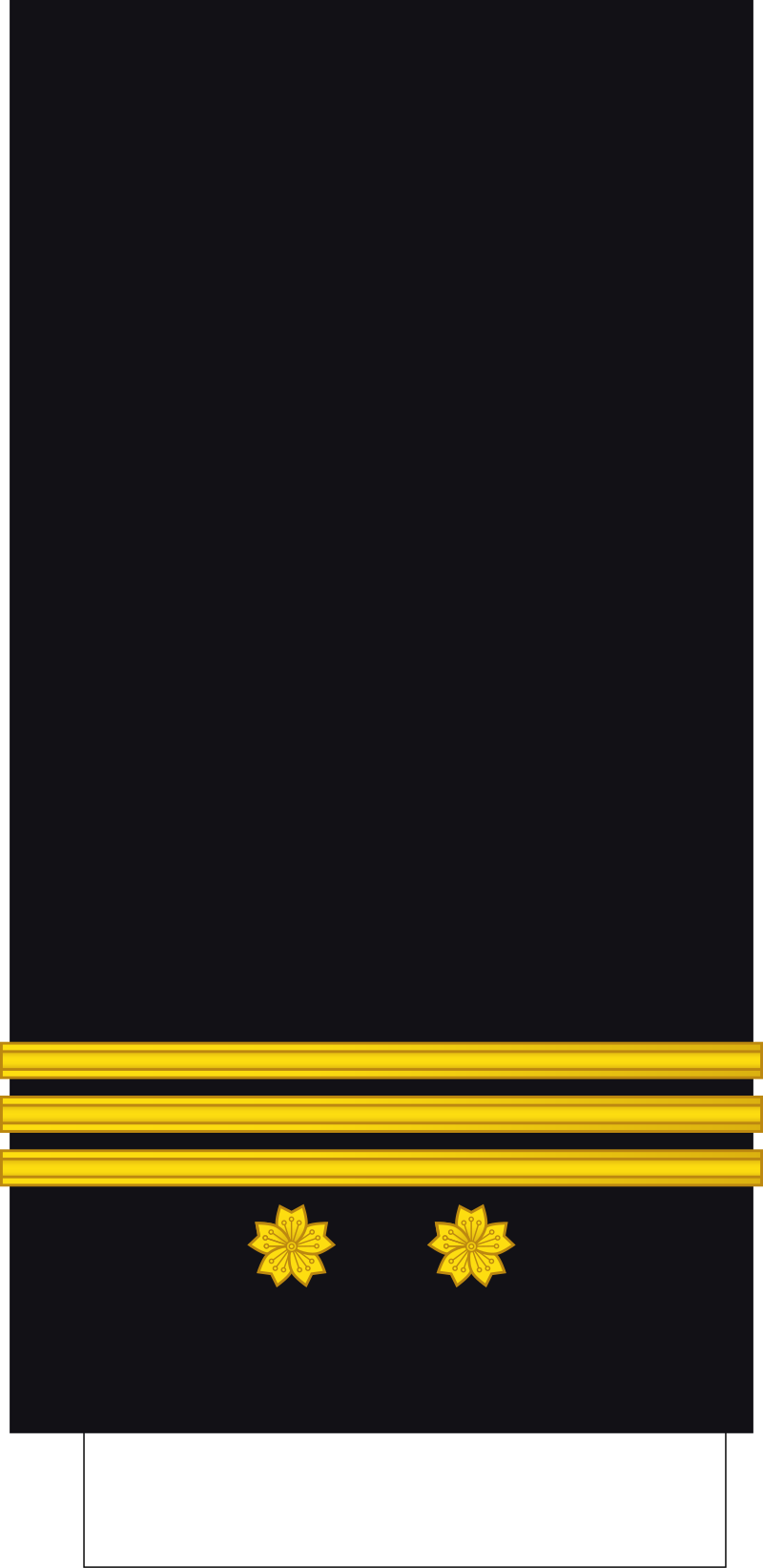
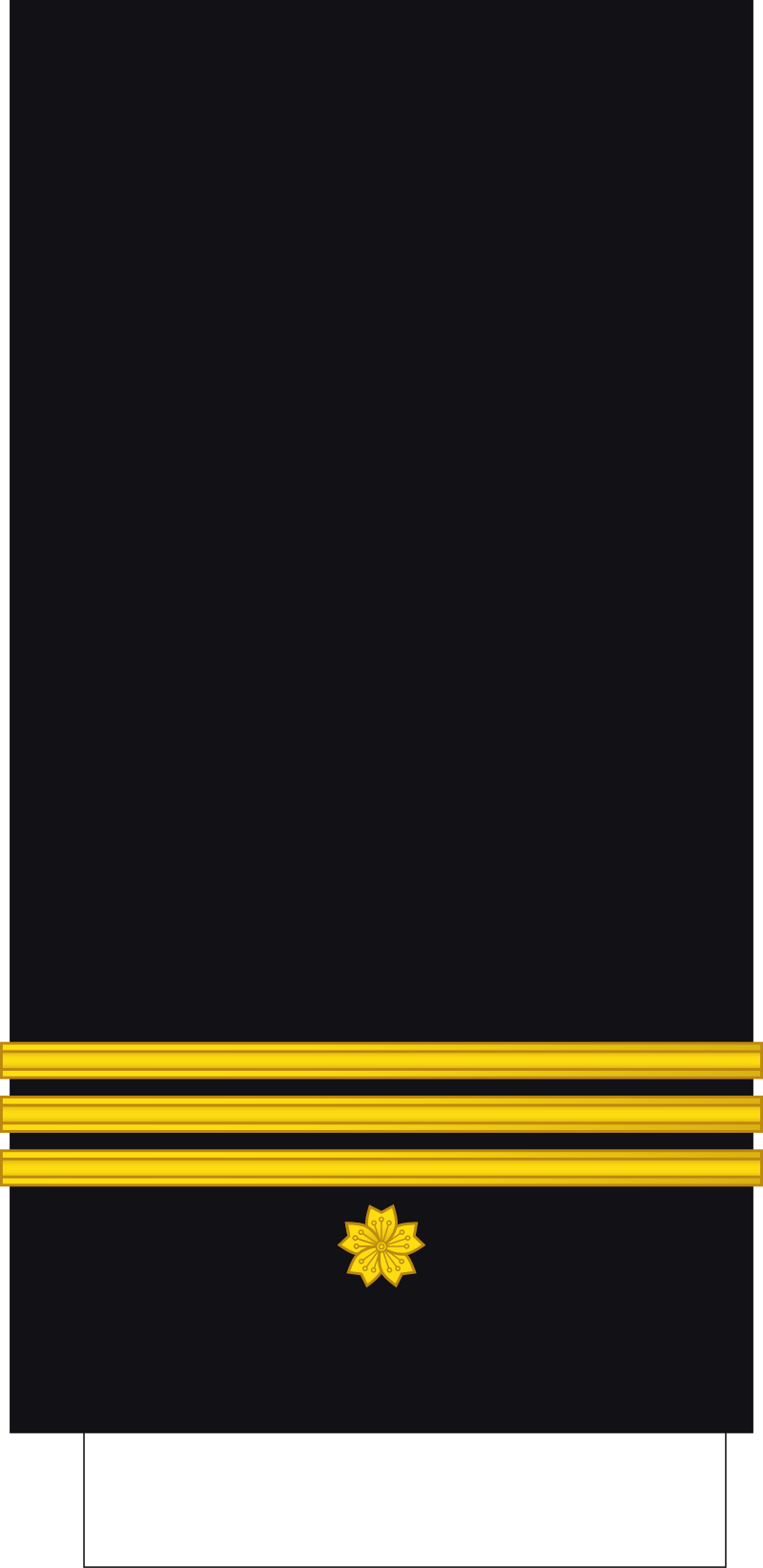
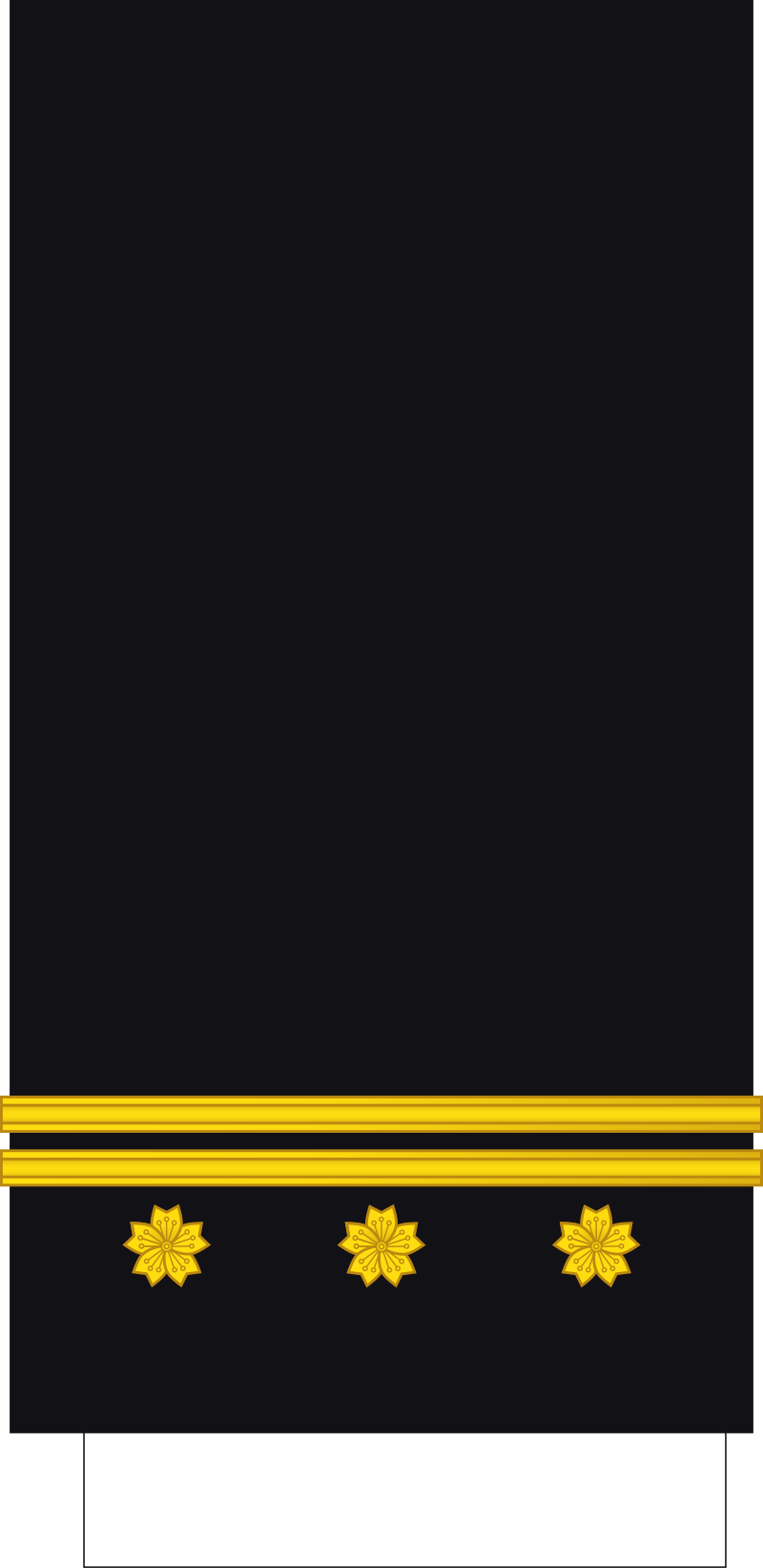
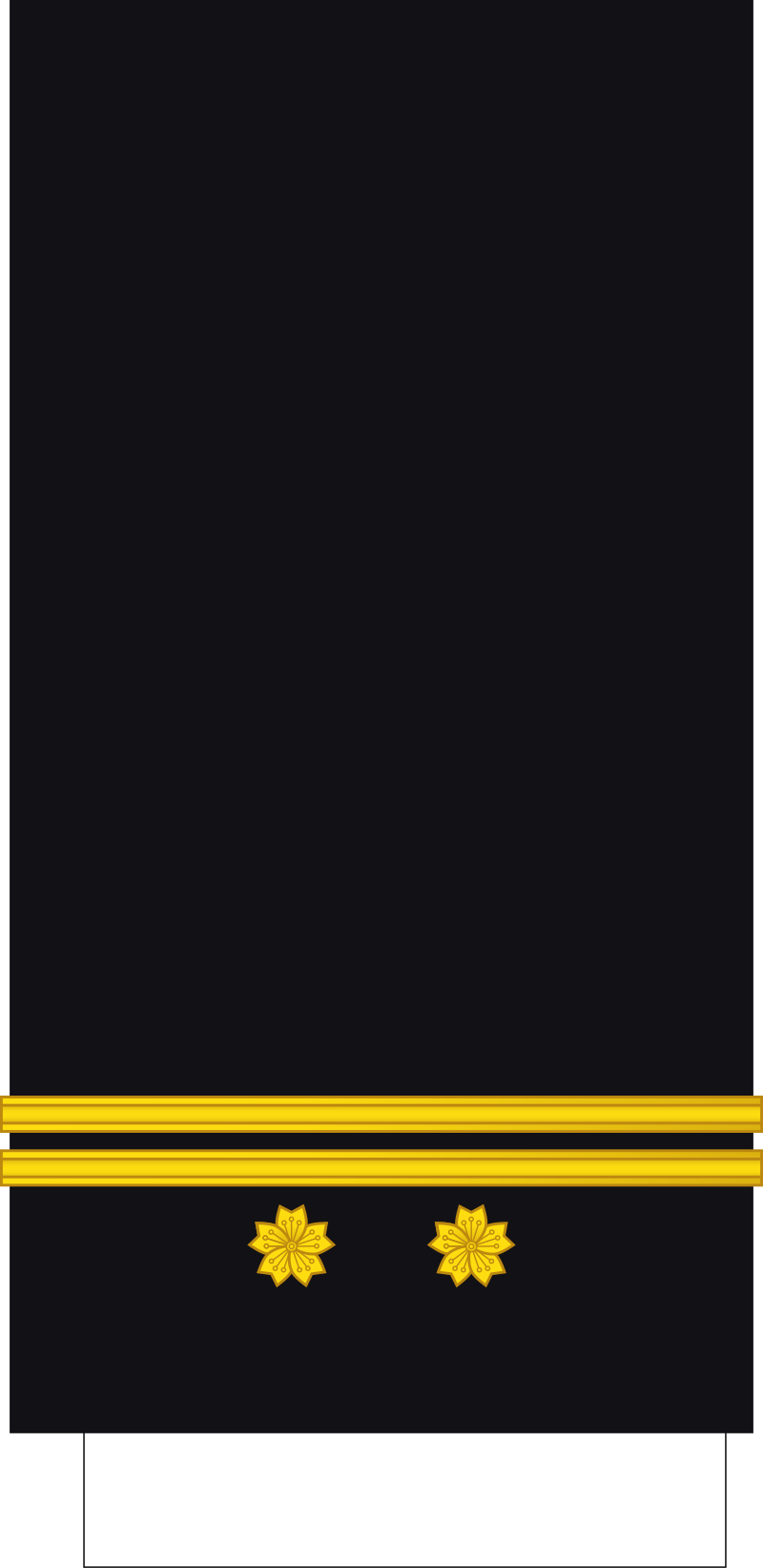
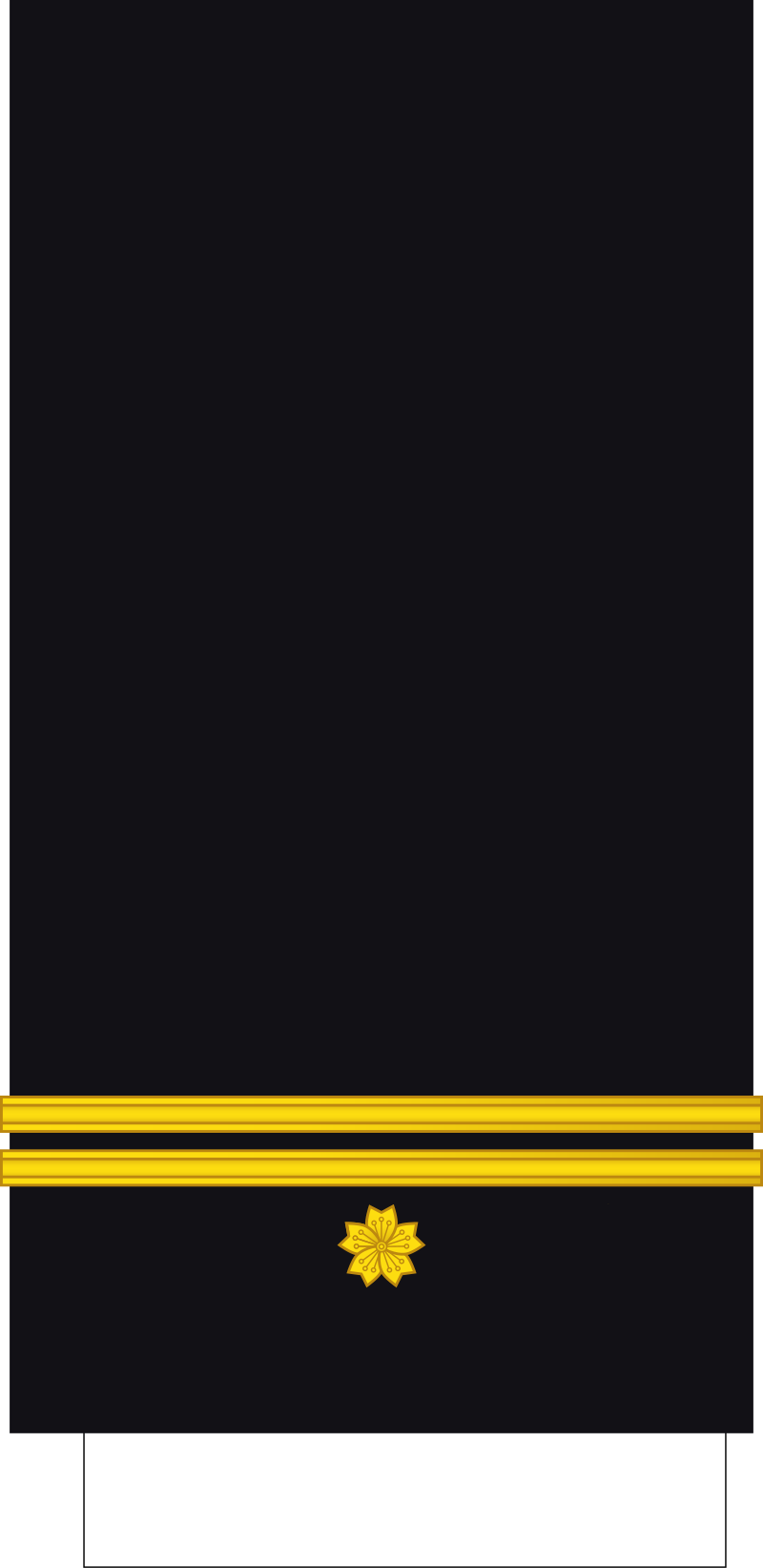
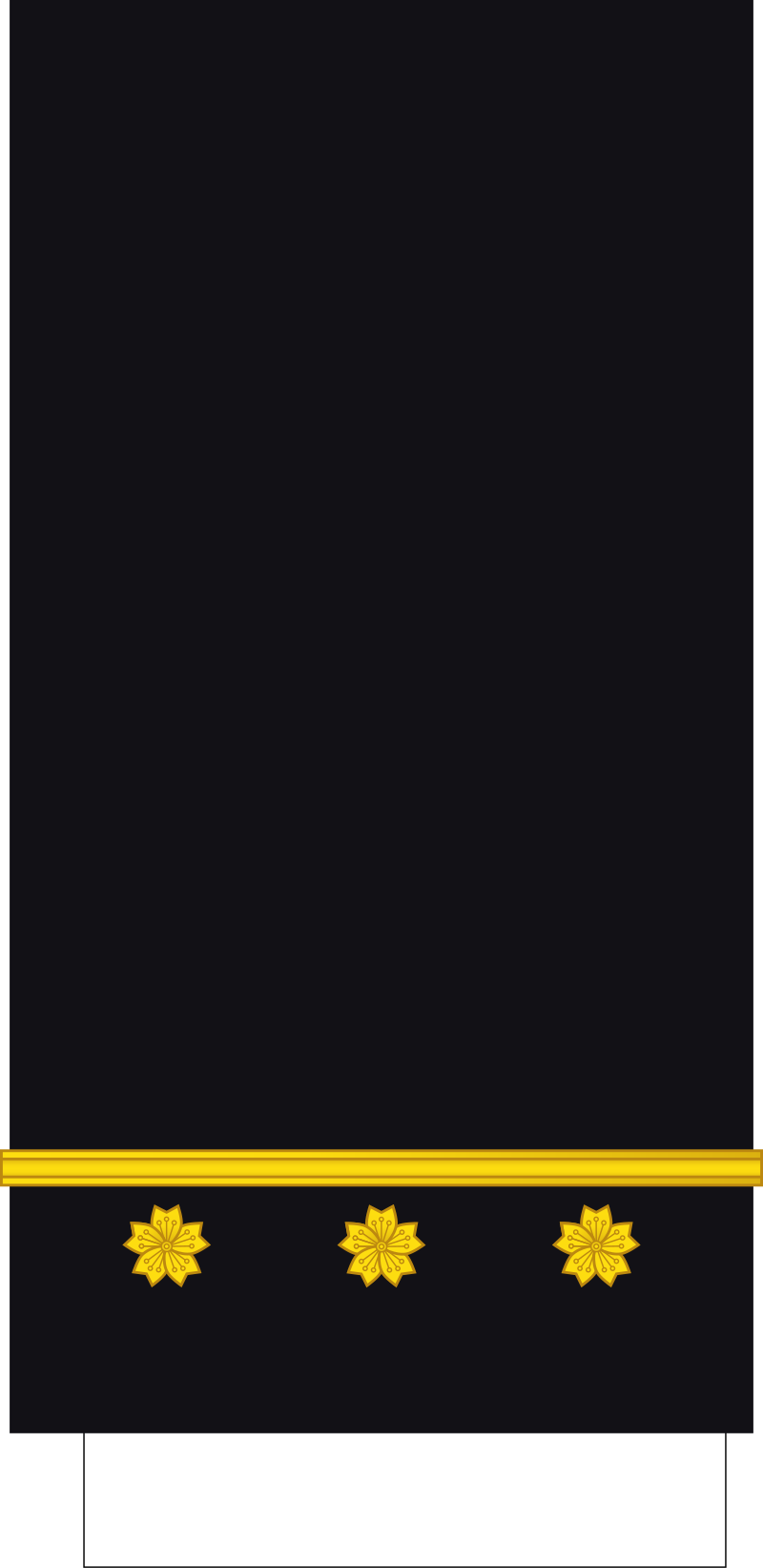
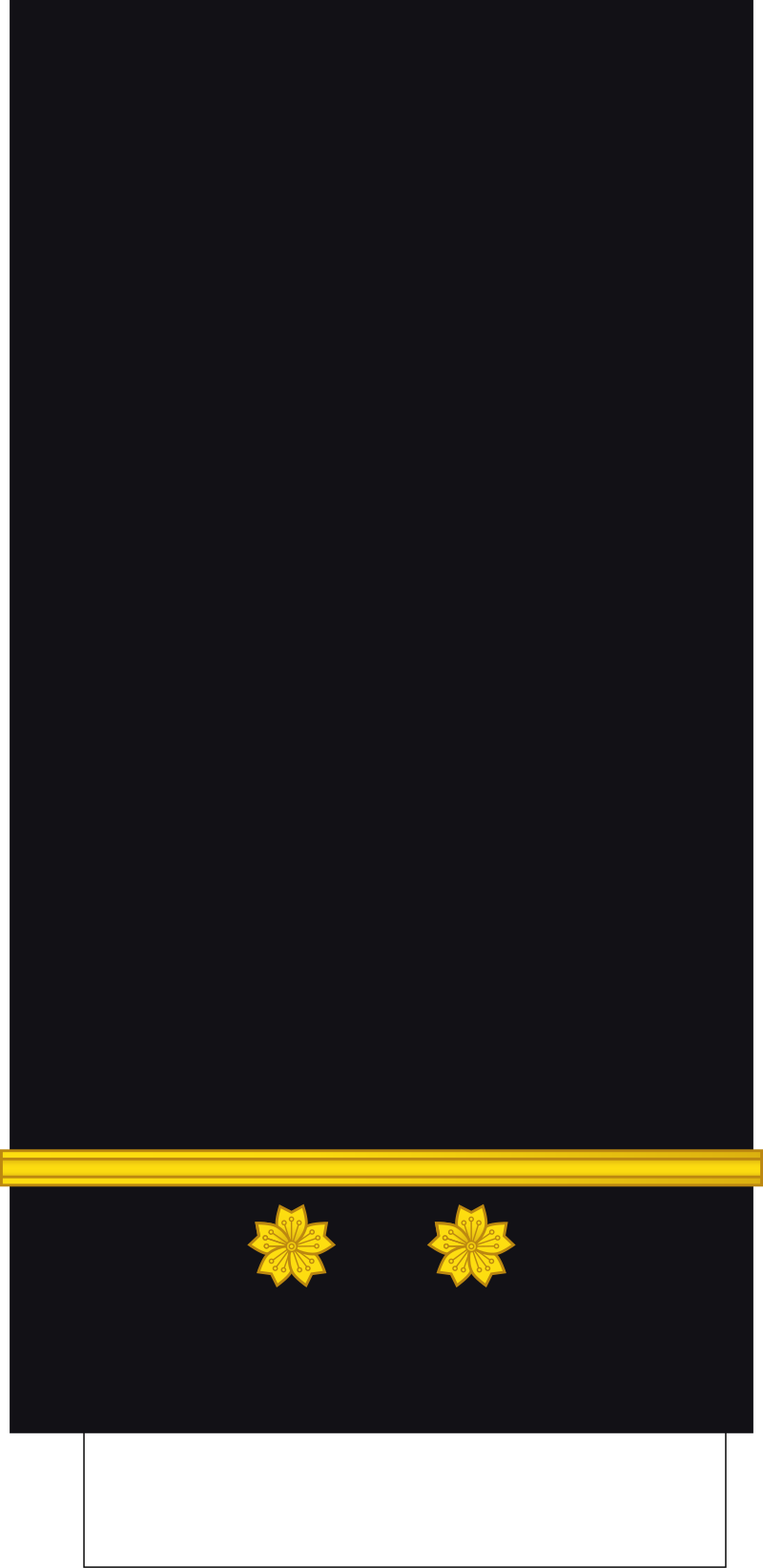
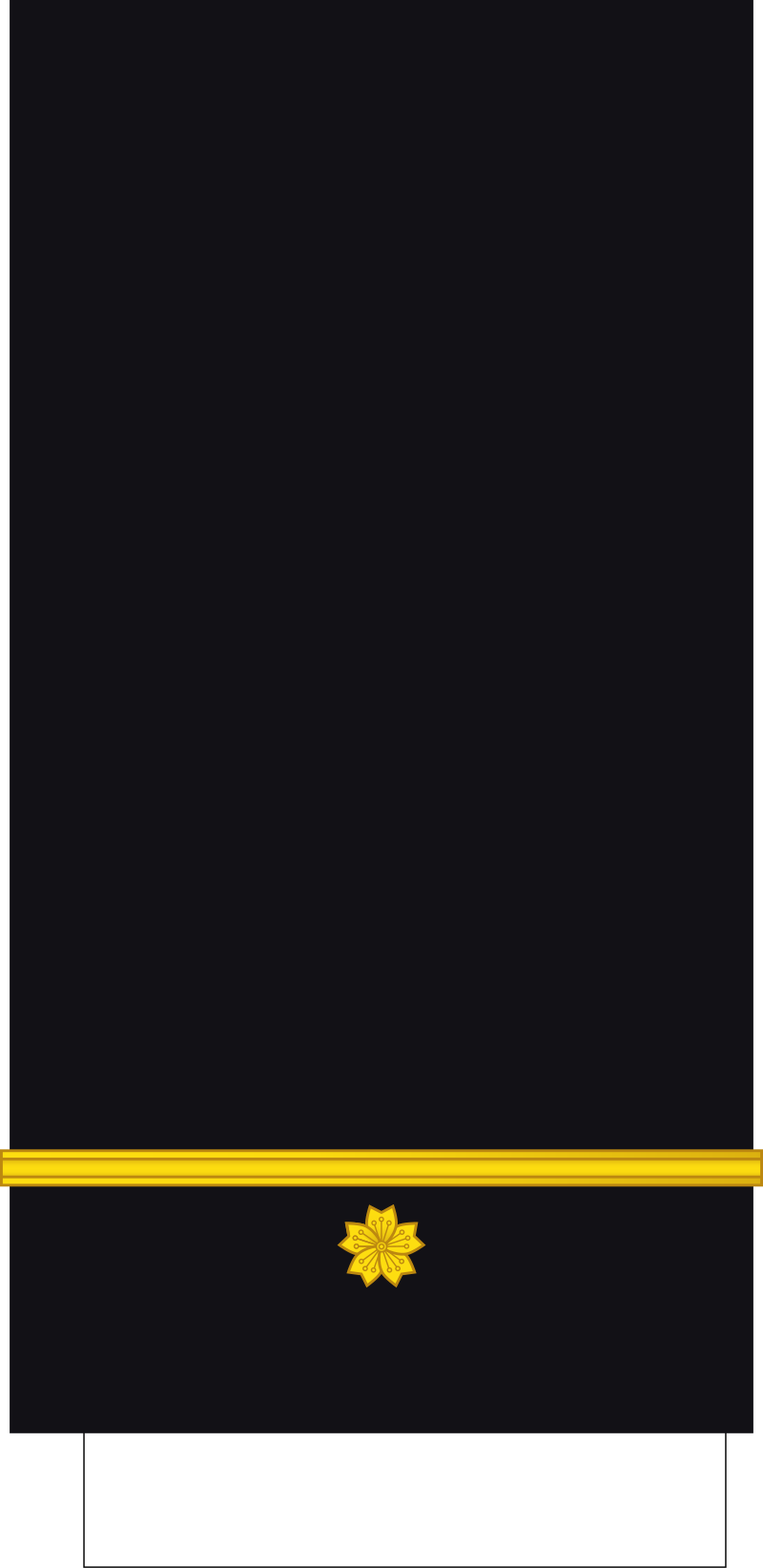
Rank group	General / flag officers				Senior officers			Junior officers
Title	大元帥海軍大将; Daigensui-kaigun-taishō	海軍大将; Kaigun-taishō (Note: Same rank insignia used for the Gensui-kaigun-taishō (元帥海軍大将), worn with an additional badge.)	海軍中将; Kaigun-chūjō	海軍少将; Kaigun-shōshō	海軍大佐; Kaigun-taisa	海軍中佐; Kaigun-chūsa	海軍少佐; Kaigun-shōsa	海軍大尉; Kaigun-tai-i	海軍中尉; Kaigun-chūi	海軍少尉; Kaigun-shōi	海軍少尉候補生 & 兵曹長; Kaigun-shōi-kōhosei & Heisōchō
Translation	Commander-in-chief	Admiral	Vice admiral	Rear admiral	Captain	Commander	Lieutenant commander	Lieutenant	Sub-lieutenant	Ensign	Midshipman & Warrant Officer
Collar service uniform (Note: Introduced in 1919.)
Shoulder summer uniform and greatcoat (Note: Introduced in 1900.)
Sleeve; 1870–1871
Sleeve; 1871–1883		(Note: Used until 1904.)									(Note: Used until 1887.)
Sleeve; 1883–1914
Sleeve; 1914–1944
Sleeve; 1944–1945
Sleeve service uniform (Note: Introduced in 1883.)
Shoulder & sleeve Special duty officers

=== Rank flags ===
Rank	Admiral	Vice admiral	Rear admiral
(1870–1871)			
(1871–1889)			
(1889–1896)			
(1896–1945)			

== Cadet and warrant officer ranks ==
Midshipman and Warrant Officer's collar insignia are the same (both were treated as officer-equivalent), but in detail, the midshipman's position is above Warrant Officer. Furthermore, midshipman rank was not via commissioned, but it was via ordered or warranted. Cadet is much more likely to be classified as slightly higher than a non-commissioned officer, since the cap's line is only one, compared to the commissioned officer's cap which has two lines and the type 3 uniform is based on the enlisted personnel.

See the table below for details regarding the cadet/WO ranks and insignia:

Insignia			Title	Translation
Collar	Shoulder	Sleeve	Title	Translation
			海軍少尉候補生 (Kaigun-shōi-kōhosei) 海軍予備少尉候補生 (Kaigun-yobi-shōi-kōhosei)	Midshipman/Reserve Midshipman
			海軍予備学生 (Kaigun-yobi-gakusei)	Reserve student
			海軍見習尉官 (Kaigun-minarai-ikan)	Apprentice (specialist branch) e.g., Apprentice surgeon (Medical branch)
		(Note: Three cherry blossoms were on the sleeve before 1942.)	兵曹長 (Heisōchō)	Warrant Officer
			海軍兵学校生徒 (Kaigun-heigakō-seito) 海軍予備生徒 (Kaigun-yobi-seito)	Cadet/Reserve cadet
			海軍委託生 (Kaigun-itakusei)	

== Non-commissioned officer and enlisted personnel rates ==
For seamen and petty officers, which were selected from enlisted men or conscripts and given training in the Navy's service/technical school, the names were different from the army names but were equal in rank. Different service branches within the navy had their specialisation augment the common rank name. For example, Imperial Japanese Navy Air Service (IJNAF) had "Flight" (飛行 Hikō) (Note: Before June 1941, it was "Aviation" (航空 Kōkū).) incorporated into the common rank name, such as Flight Petty Officer First Class (Japanese: 一等飛行兵曹, romanized: Ittō-hikō-heisō) or Flight Seaman Second Class (二等飛行兵 Nitō-hikō-hei). For practical use, these rank names were often shortened to 一飛曹 (Ippisō) or 二飛 (Nihi), respectively. The enlisted rank insignia were changed in April 1942 and the common rank names were updated in November 1942.

The enlisted insignia prior to changes in 1942 was a round patch that contained one anchor for the lowest grade, two crossed anchors for the middle grade and two crossed anchors with a cherry blossom for the highest grade. The petty officer insignia followed the same pattern but additionally had wreaths. The insignia was red on black background for winter dark-blue uniforms (also for flight suits), black on white background for summer white uniforms, and red on green background for Special Naval Landing Forces (SNLF) uniforms. The anchor would be replaced by different symbols for specialised branches; for example, aviation had an aircraft instead. After the changes in 1942, the insignia was a black patch that was square-shaped on the top and arrow-shaped on the bottom. Inside the patch, all branches had a yellow anchor and one yellow horizontal stripe for the lowest grade, two for the middle grade and three for the highest grade. Similarly as before, the petty officer insignia followed the same pattern but additionally had wreaths. For all ranks there was also a cherry blossom in the middle, which changed its colour based on the branch; for example, light blue represented aviation.

Rank group	Petty officers			Enlisted/Seamen
–1942
–1942	一等兵曹 (Ittōheisō)	二等兵曹 (Nitōheisō)	三等兵曹 (Santōheisō)	一等水兵 (Ittōsuihei)	二等水兵 (Nitōsuihei)	三等水兵 (Santōsuihei)	四等水兵 (Yontōsuihei)
Translation	Petty officer first class	Petty officer second class	Petty officer third class	Seaman first class	Seaman second class	Seaman third class	Seaman fourth class
1942–1945
1942–1945	上等兵曹 (Jōtōheisō)	一等兵曹 (Ittōheisō)	二等兵曹 (Nitōheisō)	水兵長 (Suiheichō)	上等水兵 (Jōtōsuihei)	一等水兵 (Ittōsuihei)	二等水兵 (Nitōsuihei)
Translation	Chief petty officer	Petty officer first class	Petty officer second class	Leading seaman	Senior seaman	Seaman first class	Seaman second class

== Service branch colours ==
The branch of the Navy in which non-executive personnel served was indicated by a colour code. For officers, including midshipmen, it was the colour of cloth placed as background to the cuff stripes, on both sides of the gold lace on the shoulder boards, and as longitudinal piping on the collar patches. Midshipmen and cadets wore a coloured anchor on the cap, which cadets wore on the shoulder boards as well. The branch of enlisted men was denoted by the colour of the cherry blossom flower on their rank patch; line personnel using the default gold.

Color	Branch
Purple	Engineering (Note: After 1942, the engineering branch (above commissioned officer) were merged with the line branch. Hence, the purple branch colour was used only below Warrant Officer.)
Brown	Ship and engine construction
Purple-brown	Ordnance construction
Red	Medical (surgeon, dentist and pharmacist) and Hospital(Corps)man (combat medic)
Pale green	Legal
White	Paymaster
Black	Executive/Line/Survey officers
Light blue	Aviation (Warrant and Special Duty Officer (Note: After 1942, aviation Special Duty Officer was merged with line Special Duty Officer. Hence, the light blue branch colour was used only below Warrant Officer.)) and Hydrography
Green	Chief carpenters
Grey-blue	Band master (Warrant and Special Duty Officer)

== See also ==
- Ranks of the Imperial Japanese Army
- Recruitment in the Imperial Japanese Navy
- Pilot training in the Imperial Japanese Navy
- Ranks and insignia of the Japan Self-Defense Forces
