= Saeki District, Hiroshima =

Saeki 佐伯郡
- District
- Country: Japan
- Prefecture: Hiroshima
- Merged: November 3, 2005 (now part of Hatsukaichi)

Area
  - Total: 334.77 km^{2} (129.26 sq mi)

Population (2003)
  - Total: 54,592
  - Density: 163.07/km^{2} (422.3/sq mi)
- Time zone: UTC+09:00 (JST)

Saeki (佐伯郡, Saeki-gun) was a district located in Hiroshima Prefecture, Japan.

== Population ==
As of 2003, the district had an estimated population of 54,592 and a density of 163.07 inhabitants per square kilometre (422.3/sq mi). The total area was 334.77 square kilometres (129.26 sq mi).

== Towns and villages ==
At the time of discontinuation of the district, there were two towns and no villages in the district.

- Miyajima
- Ōno

== Mergers ==
- On March 1, 2003 - the town of Saeki, and the village of Yoshiwa were merged into the expanded city of Hatsukaichi.
- On November 1, 2004 - the towns of Nōmi, Ōgaki and Okimi, along with the former town of Etajima (from Aki District), were merged to create the city of Etajima.
- On April 25, 2005 - the town of Yuki was merged into Saeki-ku, Hiroshima.
- On November 3, 2005 - the towns of Miyajima and Ōno were merged into the expanded city of Hatsukaichi. Therefore, Saeki District was dissolved as a result of this merger.
