= Etajima, Hiroshima =

City in Hiroshima Prefecture, Japan

Etajima 江田島市
- City
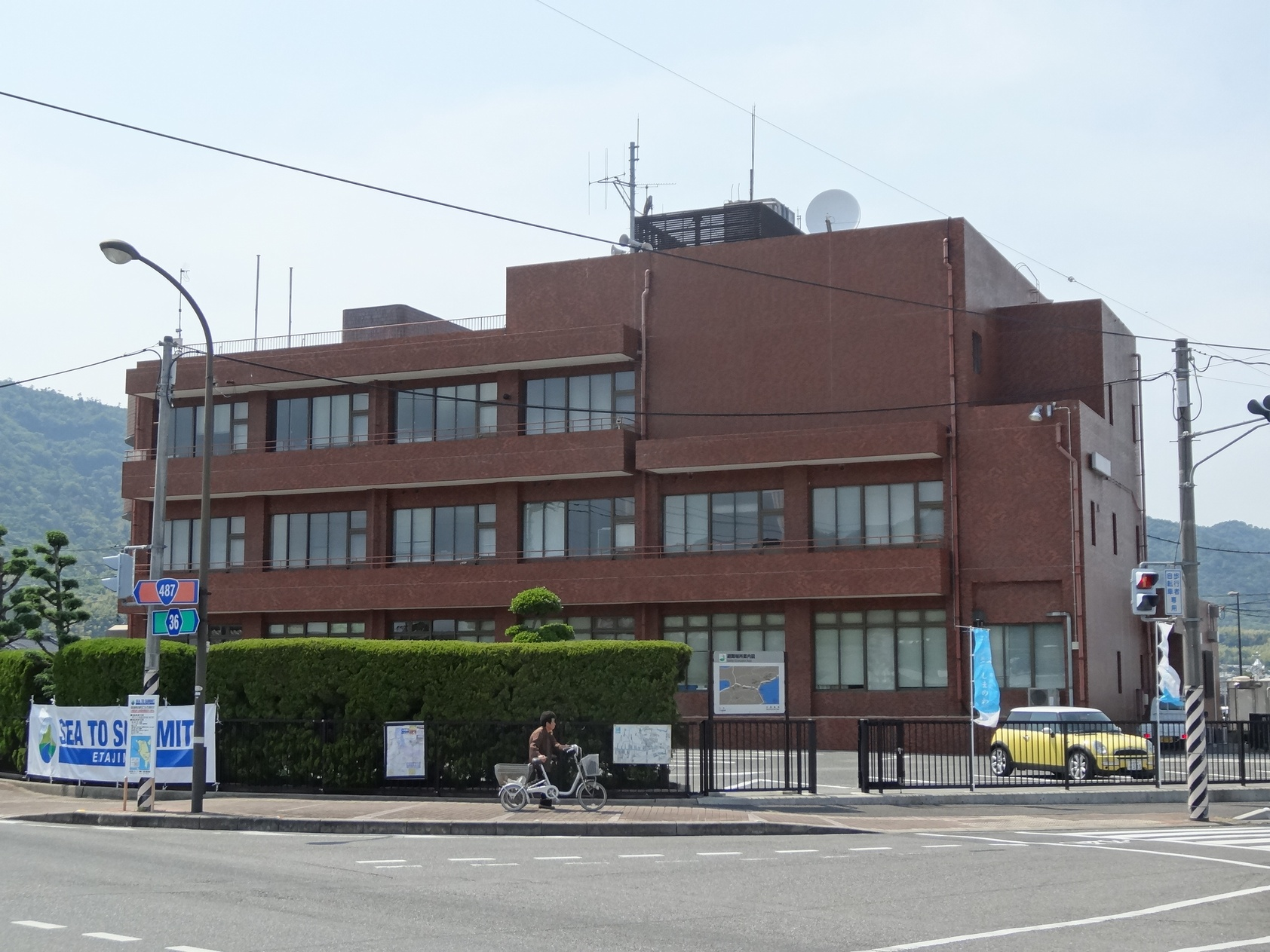
- Etajima City Hall

- Flag Emblem
- Interactive map of Etajima
- Coordinates: 34°13′N 132°27′E
- Country: Japan
- Region: Chūgoku (San'yō)
- Prefecture: Hiroshima Prefecture

Government
  - Mayor: Sansei Dote

Area
  - Total: 100.97 km^{2} (38.98 sq mi)

Population (December 31, 2016)
  - Total: 24,596
  - Density: 243.60/km^{2} (630.91/sq mi)
- Time zone: UTC+09:00 (JST)
- City hall address: 4859-9 Nōmichō Nakamachi, Etajima-shi, Hiroshima-ken; 737-2392
- Website: www.city.etajima.hiroshima.jp

Etajima (江田島市, Etajima-shi; Japanese pronunciation: [è̞.tä́.(ɟ̟͡)ʑí.mä́(.ɕì)]) is a city (formerly a town) located on the island of Etajima in Hiroshima Bay in southwestern Hiroshima Prefecture, Japan.

The modern city of Etajima was established on November 1, 2004, from the merger of the town of Etajima (from Aki District) absorbing three towns from Saeki District: Nōmi, Ōgaki, and Okimi.

As of December 31, 2016, the city has an estimated population of 24,596 and a population density of 240 persons per km^{2}. The total area is 100.97 km^{2}.

A naval museum and the Naval Academy Etajima is located in the portion of the city that was the town.

Etajima holds two annual marathons, the Orange Marathon and the Oyster Marathon.

The Orange Marathon has been held for more than two decades. It is held every year in October, at the beginning of the orange season. Each participant is rewarded for their efforts with a bag of locally grown oranges. The 23rd Annual Orange Marathon in 2008 had over 2000 participants for 1K, 3K, 5K, and 10K runs, and a half-marathon.

The Oyster Marathon is relatively a smaller scale marathon. Participants are rewarded with oysters.

On March 14, 2013, a man went on a stabbing rampage in Etajima, killing two co-workers and wounding six others.

== Transportation ==
=== Highway ===
- National Route 487

== See also ==
- Bombing of Kure (July 1945)
- Imperial Japanese Naval Academy
- Kure Naval Arsenal
- Kure Naval District
