= Kaiheidan =

- 海兵団
- Country: Empire of Japan
- Branch: Imperial Japanese Navy
- Type: Recruit training Marines
- Role: Military education and training Base defence
- Garrison/HQ: Yokosuka; Kure; Sasebo; Maizuru

Kaiheidan (海兵団, translation: Marine Corps) were units in the Imperial Japanese Navy that were primarily responsible for the training and education of enlisted and non-commissioned officer personnel. In particular, they trained the new recruits after they were recruited by the local recruitment centers around Japan. Each of the four naval districts (Yokosuka, Kure, Sasebo and Maizuru) had its own Kaiheidan. In addition, they also served as the base defence force in the secondary role.

== Training and education ==
The training and education were aimed at both the navy personnel who were later assigned to land units, such as Japanese Special Naval Landing Forces, and those who were later assigned to warships. The process involved both physical/combat skill development and technical education, and it was divided into several categories, each with a particular specialisation. The main branches included sailor, maintenance, mechanic and engineer, while the extra branches included medic, paymaster and military band. Some of the most physically demanding exercises during the training were swimming and rowing in a boat as a team of several recruits.

== See also ==
- Imperial Japanese Navy Land Forces
- Recruitment in the Imperial Japanese Navy
- Pilot training in the Imperial Japanese Navy
