= Ōno, Hiroshima =

Dissolved municipality in Hiroshima prefecture, Japan

Ōno (大野町, Ōno-chō) was a town located in Saeki District, Hiroshima Prefecture, Japan.

As of 2003, the town had an estimated population of 26,363 and a density of 372.62 persons per km^{2}. The total area is 70.75 km^{2}.

On November 3, 2005, Ōno, along with the town of Miyajima (also from Saeki District), was merged into the expanded city of Hatsukaichi.

== See also ==
- Miyajimaguchi
