= Okimi, Hiroshima =

Dissolved municipality in Hiroshima prefecture, Japan

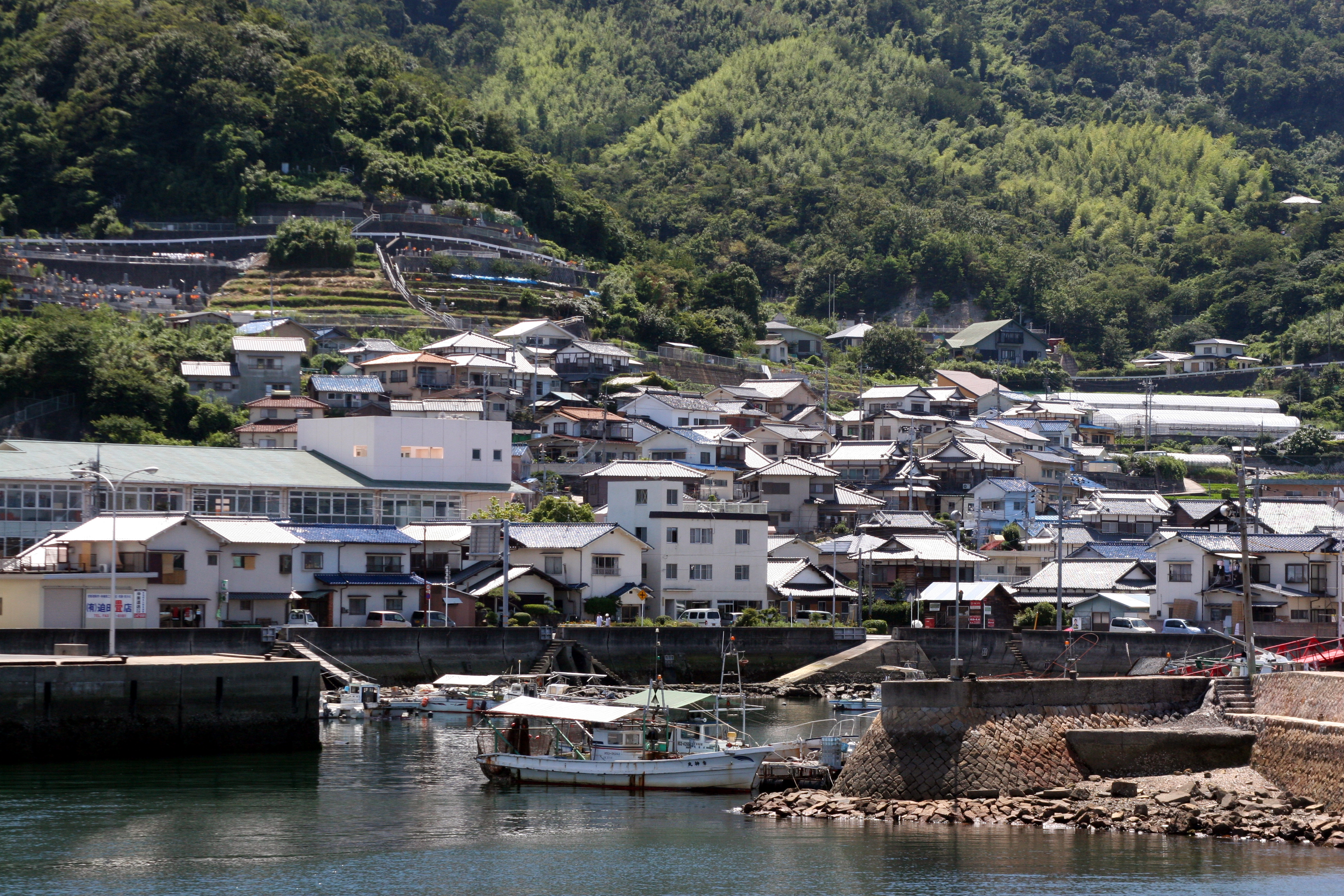
Okimi

Okimi (沖美町, Okimi-chō) was a town located in Saeki District, Hiroshima Prefecture, Japan.

== Population ==
As of 2003, the town had an estimated population of 3,849 and a density of 139.46 persons per km^{2}. The total area was 27.60 km^{2}.

== Merge ==
On November 1, 2004, Okimi, along with the towns of Nōmi and Ōgaki (all from Saeki District), and the former town of Etajima (from Aki District), was merged to create the city of Etajima and no longer exists as an independent municipality.
