= Nōmi, Hiroshima =

Dissolved municipality in Hiroshima prefecture, Japan

Nōmi (能美町, Nōmi-chō) was a town located in Saeki District, Hiroshima Prefecture, Japan.

== Population ==
As of 2003, the town had an estimated population of 5,979 and a density of 360.62 persons per km^{2}. The total area was 16.58 km^{2}.

== Merge ==
On November 1, 2004, Nōmi, along with the towns of Ōgaki and Okimi (all from Saeki District), and the former town of Etajima (from Aki District), was merged to create the city of Etajima and no longer exists as an independent municipality.
