= Ōgaki, Hiroshima =

Dissolved municipality in Hiroshima prefecture, Japan

Ōgaki (大柿町, Ōgaki-chō) was a town located in Saeki District, Hiroshima Prefecture, Japan.

On November 1, 2004, Ōgaki, along with the towns of Nōmi and Okimi (all from Saeki District), and the former town of Etajima (from Aki District), was merged to create the city of Etajima and no longer exists as an independent municipality.

As of 2003, the town had an estimated population of 8,765 and a density of 329.76 persons per km^{2}. The total area was 26.58 km^{2}.
