= Naval Academy Etajima =

Naval training base in Etajima, Japan

Coordinates: 34°14′42″N 132°28′26″E

Etajima base (JMSDF Etajima Naval Base) in Etajima city, Hiroshima prefecture is in the Etajima-cho government building and is the base of the Japan Maritime Self-Defense Force. Beside housing the 1st Technical School and the Officer Candidates School, it is home to the local Kure Naval District, LCAC training facilities, and Self-Defense Force oil storage. In addition, the Special Forces of the Maritime Self Defense Force are based here.

== History ==
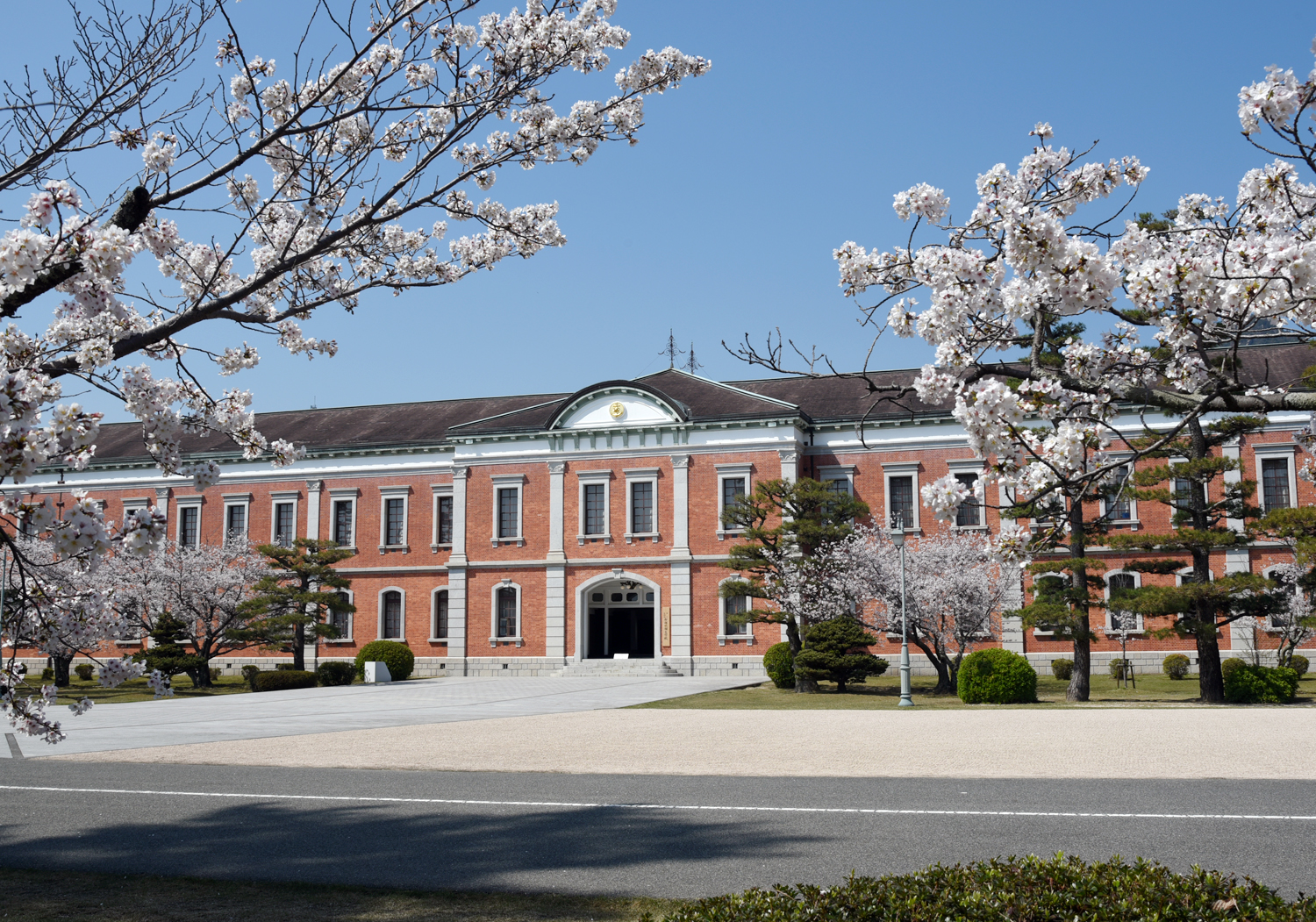
Former building of the Imperial Japanese Navy Academy, now used for the JMSDF Officer Candidate School

The predecessor of the Etajima base was the branch officer training system of the Imperial Japanese Naval Academy. The Naval Academy moved to Etajima from Tsukiji, Tokyo in 1888. The current academy was re-established in 1956.

Many of the facilities of the former Naval Academy are now used by the 1st Technical School and the Officer Candidate School.

== Agency unit arrangement ==
- The Maritime Self Defense Force 1st Technical School
- The Maritime Self Defense Force Officer Candidate School
- The 31st Fleet Air Wing
- The target plane service area
- The Special guard (Maritime Self Defense Force)
- The Etajima police duty casual detachment
- The Kure structure learning/repairing depot
- The Hitonose oil storage branch
- The Kure ammunition storehouse and maintenance depot
- The 1st Technical School sick bay

== The Naval History Museum ==
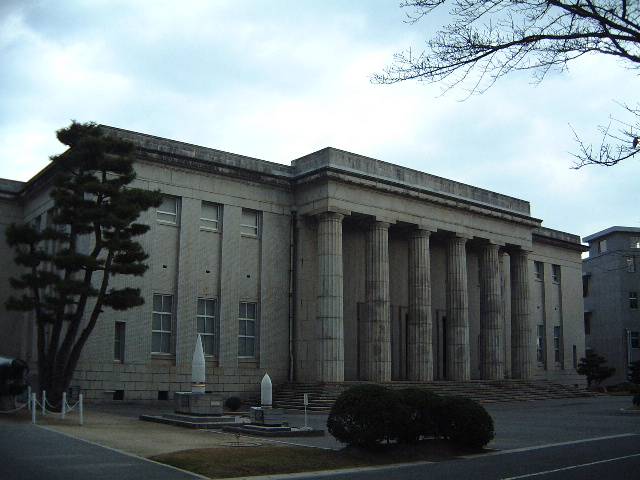
Naval history museum

The Naval History Museum is a building of reinforced concrete that was constructed in 1936. It holds artifacts of Heihachiro Togo, Horatio Nelson, John Paul Jones and Isoroku Yamamoto, as well as a book of naval officers which holds more than 10,000 names. Inside the site is a midget submarine that was used in the Pearl Harbor attack; artifacts from the Japanese battleship Yamato and the Japanese battleship Mutsu are on display.

== See also ==
- Bombing of Kure (July 1945)
- Imperial Japanese Army
- Imperial Japanese Navy
- Imperial Japanese Navy Air Service
- Kure Naval Arsenal
- Military history of Japan
- Japan Coast Guard Academy
- National Defense Academy of Japan
