= Imperial Japanese Naval Academy =

Naval academy in Japan

Coordinates: 34°14′41.5″N 132°28′26.1″E

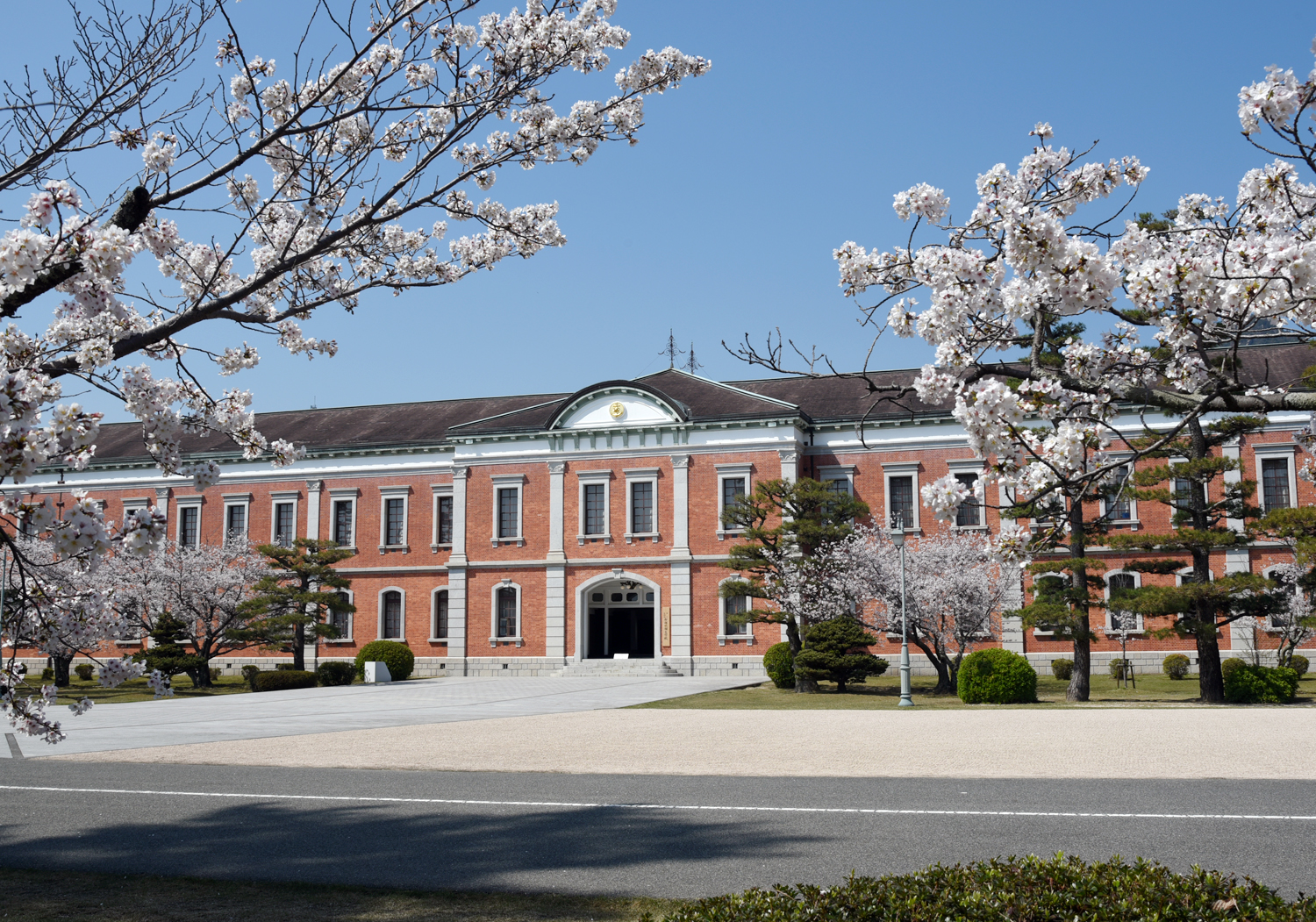
The building of Imperial Japanese Naval Academy

The Higher Naval College – later the Imperial Japanese Naval Academy – during its years at Tsukiji, Tokyo, between 1869 and 1888.

The Imperial Japanese Naval College (海軍兵学校, Kaigun Heigakkō; Kyujitai: 海󠄀軍兵學校󠄁, abbreviated as 海兵 Kaihei) was a school established to train line officers for the Imperial Japanese Navy. It was originally located in Nagasaki, moved to Yokohama in 1866, and was relocated to Tsukiji, Tokyo, in 1869. It moved to Etajima, Hiroshima, in 1888. Students studied for three or four years, and upon graduation were ordered (warranted) as Midshipmen, commissioned to the rank of Ensign/Acting Sub-Lieutenant after a period of active duty and an overseas cruise. In 1943, a separate school for naval aviation was opened in Iwakuni, and in 1944, another naval aviation school was established in Maizuru. The academy was closed in 1945, when the Imperial Japanese Navy was abolished. The Naval Academy Etajima opened in 1956 and the site now serves as the location for Officer Candidate School of the Japan Maritime Self-Defense Force.

== See also ==
- Imperial Japanese Army Academy
- Army War College
- Imperial Japanese Army Air Force Academy
- Imperial Japanese Navy
- Imperial Japanese Naval Engineering College
- Naval War College
- Recruitment in the Imperial Japanese Navy
- List of graduates of the Japanese Imperial Military Academies
- Naval Academy Etajima
- Gosei (meditation) - Academy's motto in most of the classes
- Pilot training in the Imperial Japanese Navy

== External sources ==
- Media related to Imperial Japanese Naval Academy at Wikimedia Commons
