= Case Closed season 19 =

Season of television series

Case Closed
- Season 19
- The cover of the first DVD compilation for season nineteen of Detective Conan released by Shogakukan
- No. of episodes: 40

Release
- Original network: NNS (ytv)
- Original release: February 27, 2010 – February 12, 2011

Season chronology
- ← Previous; Season 18 Next → Season 20

The nineteenth season of the Case Closed anime was directed by Kōjin Ochi and produced by TMS Entertainment and Yomiuri Telecasting Corporation. The series is based on Gosho Aoyama's Case Closed manga series. In Japan, the series is titled Detective Conan (名探偵コナン, Meitantei Conan) but was changed due to legal issues with the title Detective Conan. The series focuses on the adventures of teenage detective Shinichi Kudo who was turned into a child by a poison called APTX 4869, but continues working as a detective under the alias Conan Edogawa.

The episodes use six pieces of theme music: three opening themes and three ending themes. The first opening theme is "As the Dew" by Garnet Crow until episode 582. The second opening theme beginning in episode 583 is "Summer Time Gone" by Mai Kuraki. The opening theme starting on episode 602 is "tear drops" by Caos Caos Caos. The ending theme "Hello Mr. My Yesterday" by Hundred Percent Free is used for episodes 565 to 587. Starting 588, the ending theme is "Tomorrow is the Last Time" by Mai Kuraki until episode 601. The ending theme Jûgoya Kuraishisu (Kimi ni Aitai) (十五夜クライシス～君に逢いたい～, lit. "Full Moon Night's Crisis (I Want to See You)") by Hundred Percent Free is used for the remainder of the episodes.

The season initially ran from February 27, 2010, through February 12, 2011 on Nippon Television Network System in Japan. The season was later collected and released in ten DVD compilations by Shogakukan between January 28, 2011 and October 28, 2011, in Japan.

== Episode list ==
No.	No. in season	Title	Directed by	Written by	Original air date
566	1	"The Partner is Santa-san"; Transliteration: "Aibō wa Santa-san" (Japanese: 相棒はサンタさん)	Koichiro Kuroda	Takeo Ohno	February 27, 2010
Shigeko Ishikawa is being stalked by an unknown man. While Kogoro investigates, Conan is forced to watch over her two-year-old son nicknamed Santa. Ishikawa is later kidnapped by the unknown man and Conan investigates Santa's home in order to search for clues. Conan finds a feather of a White-eye and learns that Santa has been giving away figurines to people in the neighborhood. Conan realizes what the culprit's motive is after learning about the endangered counterpart of the White-eye, the Black-eye; He asks Santa to take him to the man who received the White-eye. Eventually ending at an abandoned pet store, Conan confronts the culprit and reveals that the culprit was intending to sell the endangered Black-eye to the underground economy and kidnapped Santa's mother when he perceived the White-eye figurine to be a threat. Conan clears the misunderstanding and explains Santa gave him the figurine as a friendly gesture. The culprit, regretting his actions, and releases Santa's mother and prepares to turn himself in. The dealer whom the culprit has organized a meeting with attempts to steal the bird but is apprehended by Conan. Later that day Santa's name is revealed to be Haruka Ishikawa and that she is a girl.
567	2	"Murderous Intent Raining on an Outdoor Spa"; Transliteration: "Rotenburo ni Furu Satsui" (Japanese: 露天風呂に降る殺意)	Masakazu Yamazaki	Yu Kaneko	March 6, 2010
Kogoro takes Ran and Conan to an onsen by the ocean. When they hear the sound of a boulder falling, they find a man named Hideaki Umezu, a mortgage company president, dead. The police presume that a boulder rolled off the hill and killed Umezu. However, Conan reveals that there are scratch marks around the spot where the bolder rested revealing that someone used the boulder to murder Umezu. The suspects are Umezu's secretary, his two daughters, and the onsen manager. After further investigation, Conan tranquilizes Kogoro and reveals the murderer to be onsen manager, Koichi Maekawa. Conan reveals that Umezu was not killed by the boulder but drowned, evidenced by the dirt under Umezu's fingernails revealing the struggle. Conan explains the boulder was used to create an alibi for Maekawa by using a wooden block connected to a line and buoy. When the tide lowered, the buoy pulled the wooden block and caused the boulder to roll off. Maekawa confesses and reveals that Umezu pressured Maekawa's father to sell the land which indirectly resulted in his death.
568	3	"Inspector Shiratori, Memories of the Cherry Blossom (Part 1)"; Transliteration: "Shiratori-keibu、Sakura no Omoide (Zenpen)" (Japanese: 白鳥警部、桜の思い出（前編）)	Minoru Tozawa	N/A	March 13, 2010
At the theaters, the Detective Boys run into Shiratori who is depressed since Sato's affection is being directed towards Takagi. Shiratori reveals that he is bind to Sato because of an encounter he had with her in the past. Shiratori explains Sato as a young girl stood up to two thieves by herself. Shiratori helps her stop the thieves and in return receives from her a drink with paper folded sakura. Conan questions if the girl was actually Sato as their personalities differ greatly. During the movie, Shiratori runs into a woman named Nami Kasakura who offers him a drink with paper folded sakuras causing Shiratori to consider the possibility she was the girl in the past. After the movie, Kasakura tells Shiratori she is being stalked and asks him to investigate. At her apartment, Kasakura's boyfriend is found dead. Conan suspects Kasakura but her alibi supposedly states she was at the theater the whole time.
569	4	"Inspector Shiratori, Memories of the Cherry Blossom (Part 2)"; Transliteration: "Shiratori-keibu、Sakura no Omoide (Kōhen)" (Japanese: 白鳥警部、桜の思い出（後編）)	Nobuharu Kamanaka	N/A	March 20, 2010
Shiratori has Takagi search for the drinks at the theater and to bring them to the apartment. Shiratori reveals his deductions and explains that Kasakura drugged him with sleeping pills and placed her tuque on him to create her alibi by having Shiratori impersonate her. Takagi arrives at the department and shows them Shiratori's drink. Shiratori reveals that he had broken a piece from the flower design yet all the pieces remained on his drink revealing that Kasakura switched his drink while he was asleep to hide the fact there were sleeping pills in them. As further evidence, Shiratori explains that there was a white string on his head from the tuque meaning his hair should also be found on Kasakura's tuque. Kasakura confesses and reveals that her boyfriend had been cheating on her for the past two years and she killed him in vengeance. Shiratori, saddened that the girl of his past has become a criminal, is cheered by Ayumi who offers him paper folded sakura's and repeats the same thing the girl in Shiratori's past says. Ayumi explains she learned that from her teacher Sumiko Kobayashi causing Shiratori to realize Kobayashi was the girl from his past.
570	5	"The Crime with Zero Possibility to be Proven"; Transliteration: "Risshō Kakuritsu Zero no Hanzai" (Japanese: 立証確率ゼロの犯罪)	Yoshitaka Nagaoka	Junichi Miyashita	March 27, 2010
Conan, Kogoro, and Ran pass by a woman named Kyouko Takahata who passes out upon receiving a phone call that her brother-in-law, Itsurou Soejima was found dead in her home. They head to her house along with the police to discover that the drunk Soejima died when he fired a shotgun toward the ceiling causing a chandelier to fall on top of him. The police conclude it was suicide, however Conan believes it was a carefully planned murder. Conan investigates and discovers that in the past year, Takahata was involved in all the alcoholism incidents that almost resulted in Soejima's death. After gathering the evidence, Conan tranquilizes Kogoro to reveal his deductions. Conan reveals that Takahata called Soejima to her home and had prepared the alcohol and shotgun to tempt Soejima, who is a recovering alcoholic. As evidence, Conan reveals that a piece of her nail was found in Soejima's house while she was deleting Soejima's caller history to cover her traces. Takahata confesses and reveals that her sister's abusive relationship with Soejima caused her death. Conan however reveals a message on the sister's phone revealing she actually died from an illness and had loved Soejima very much.
571	6	"Battle of the Haunted Warehouse's Treasure (Part 1)"; Transliteration: "Mononoke Kura deo takara Batoru (Zenpen)" (Japanese: もののけ倉でお宝バトル（前編）)	Shigeru Yamazaki	N/A	May 1, 2010
The Detective Boys hear a rumor from a classmate about a warehouse with a treasure that can instantly appear and disappear. Before heading to the warehouse to investigate, the Detective Boys drop by Conan's house where they run into an unknown person unbeknownst to Conan. During the warehouse investigation, Conan notes there are fresh adult-sized footprints even though the warehouse has been locked up for years and that they lead up to an abacus with an odd number of beads. Conan decides to look through the warehouse by climbing a tree and sees a pile of treasure. The Detective Boys reenter the warehouse from the front entrance only to discover the warehouse it empty again. While Conan deduces that there might be a mechanism in the roof or in the floor, the Detective Boys prove him wrong declaring that the distance between the window and the roof is two meters from the outside and inside and that the markers they placed on the floors did not change. The marker leaning against the wall however has disappeared causing Conan to wonder what the mechanism in the warehouse is.
572	7	"Battle of the Haunted Warehouse's Treasure (Part 2)"; Transliteration: "Mononoke Kura deo Takara Batoru (Kōhen)" (Japanese: もののけ倉でお宝バトル（後編）)	Masakazu Yamazaki	N/A	May 8, 2010
Conan investigates and realizes the warehouse is designed by Samizu Kichiemon (三水 吉右衛門) and that the abacus is the switch that will reveal the secret room. The Detective Boys and Conan have the owner of the warehouse call the police before revealing their deductions. When the police arrive, the Detective Boys explain that the warehouse has a low ceiling which was concealed by the interior design of the warehouse. A fake window was installed inside the warehouse to mimic the distance between the window and the ceiling outside the warehouse. Conan then explains if the abacus is arranged as to display the Kanji Samizu (三水), the ceiling would lower revealing the secret room. After doing so, they discover a man in the room. They learn that the man was a serial robber and the treasure was all stolen good. Conan then reveals to the Detective Boys that he discovered Heiji had been giving them advice during the investigation and forces Heiji to come out of hiding.
573	8	"The Whereabouts of the Embarrassing Charm (Part 1)"; Transliteration: "Hazukashii Omamori no Yukae (Zenpen)" (Japanese: 恥ずかしいお守りの行方（前編）)	Koichiro Kuroda	N/A	May 15, 2010
After returning to Detective Mori's agency, Heiji asks them to help find Teruaki Kunisue, a sophomore at Teitan University who Heiji accidentally gave Kazuha's lucky charm to. They all head to Teitan University the next day only to find out that he has not been attending classes due to a broken wrist. Ran learns from Kazuha that she left a photo of Heiji in it and does not want Heiji to find out about the charm's contents. Later, Ran, Conan, Heiji, and Kazuha, go to a sports parlor where Teruaki was last spotted only to discover from the police that Teruaki has been assaulted by an unknown assailant. They are able to narrow down the suspects to three people since they were not in the bar-room during the time of the attack.
574	9	"The Whereabouts of the Embarrassing Charm (Part 2)"; Transliteration: "Hazukashii Omamori no Yukae (Kōhen)" (Japanese: 恥ずかしいお守りの行方（後編）)	Nobuharu Kamanaka	N/A	May 22, 2010
Conan and Heiji interrogate the three suspects to learn that they respectively attended a sumo match, a volleyball game, and a soccer game. Conan and Heiji deduce that Teruaki attended a baseball game and that one of the suspects must have also attended the same game. Conan and Heiji realize that the soccer game fan, Takuya Kyuma, had been using baseball terms to describe a soccer game meaning he is the culprit. They reveal that Kyuma attacked Teruaki for a baseball he got from a home run and reveal that the baseball is in his popcorn bag. Kyuma confesses and reveals his recently deceased girlfriend's wish was to receive a baseball hit from a home run. At the hospital, Teruaki decides to give Kyuma the baseball and drop the charges after hearing his story. Teruaki apologizes to Kazuha and tells her Heiji has her charm. Heiji finds the picture has been doodled on and misunderstands Kazuha's feelings for him and enrages him.
575	10	"The Alibi of the Black Dress (Part 1)"; Transliteration: "Kuroki Doresu no Aribai (Zenpen)" (Japanese: 黒きドレスのアリバイ（前編）)	Minoru Tozawa	N/A	May 29, 2010
Conan, Kogoro, Ran, and Sonoko are at a tea house when a woman wearing Gothic Lolita fashion clothing enters the tea house, orders a glass of water, and leaves. Ten minutes later, a woman named Yuika Shoudou, arrives to the tea house where they learn that she was supposed to meet with the gothic girl from before. The four then leave to go shopping. On the way, a pair of thieves tries to steal their shopping bags by spilling ice cream on Ran and Sonoko but are foiled by Conan. The girls are forced to change in a public restroom where they find the gothic girl from before dead. The cell phone of the deceased, Mihiro Kuze, reveals she had been receiving phone calls from Shoudou. The police confirm with the waitress at the tea house that Kuze and Shoudou arrived ten minutes apart and with the public restroom thirty minutes away, removes Shoudou as a suspect. Conan however reveals that the gothic girl that entered the restaurant may not have been Kuze since the Gothic Lolita fashion distracts them from her face.
576	11	"The Alibi of the Black Dress (Part 2)"; Transliteration: "Kuroki Doresu no Aribai (Kōhen)" (Japanese: 黒きドレスのアリバイ（後編）)	Shigeru Yamazaki	N/A	June 5, 2010
The police investigate the glass the gothic girl was drinking which holds Kuze's fingerprints. At the ghotic lolita shop where Kuze bought her clothes. The employee there revealed that the gothic clothes were sold in pairs causing Conan to receive an epiphany on Shoudou's allibi. Conan tranquilizes Kogoro and reveals that the gothic girl that entered the tea house was Shoudou and that the glass was pre-prepared with Kuze's fingerprints. As evidence, Conan reveals that the wound on Shoudou's hand reveals that she was scratched by Kuze while strangling her and that her blood must be in the public restroom somewhere. Soon after, Takagi calls confirming that a luminol reaction was positive in one of the stalls and that a test will prove whose blood it is. Shoudou confesses and reveals that Kuze caused her to lose her boyfriend, housing, job, and friends as Kuze wanted Shoudou all to herself.
577	12	"The Truth Lit Up By the Fireflies"; Transliteration: "Hotaru ga Tomoshi ta Shinjitsu" (Japanese: ホタルが灯した真実)	Masakazu Yamazaki	Masaki Tsuji	June 19, 2010
The Detective Boys attend a firefly festival to commemorate a shinto shrine in a village. The truck soon arrives with the fireflies and they are released into the fields. Later one of the truck drivers, Tokurou Nakamine, is found murdered and three of the villagers are the prime suspects. Conan notices a flashlight Genta found inside the truck and realizes who the murderer is. Using Agasa, Conan reveals the second truck driver, Shuchirou Tarumi, to be the murderer. Conan reveals that Tarumi murdered Nakamine in a desolated location near the village before turning the truck around and meeting with the other villagers. As evidence, Conan reveals the flashlight Genta found was actually a dictation machine with Nakamine's voice recorded on it. Tarumi takes Haibara hostage and attempts to flee but is eventually apprehended. Conan reveals that Tarumi's was tried of being blackmailed by for embezzling money from the firefly project and Nakamine's company and thus motivated his murder.
578	13	"The Crisis Beckoned by the Red Omen"; Transliteration: "Kiki Yobu Akai Ōmen" (Japanese: 危機呼ぶ赤い前兆)	Akira Yoshimura	N/A	June 26, 2010
The Detective Boys run into a strange man named Kyouzou Daita who invites them to a cake shop after they apprehended a thief who robbed him. While talking with him, Conan notices the man is acting strangely. That night, the Detective Boys confront him and reveal he plans to kill himself and make it look like an accident in order to use the insurance money to pay for his grand daughter's surgery. Daita confesses and reveals that after losing a winning lottery ticket, he contemplated suicide was his only option. Conan deduces that the lottery ticket is in his reading glasses case containing his after hearing his story. Daita, happy to have the money for the surgery, jokingly tells the Detective Boys he also thought of robbing a bank causing the Detective Boys to discuss the fact that a man resembling Shuichi Akai's description was at the bank. The next day, Kogoro receives an anonymous request to investigate a case involving red shirts with long sleeves. The mysterious caller requests to meet them on the third floor of a department store. At the store, the three then run into a man who reveals he has been strapped with bombs.
579	14	"The Suggestion of Black Thirteen"; Transliteration: "Kuroki Juu-san no Sajesuto" (Japanese: 黒き13の暗示)	Koichiro Kuroda	N/A	July 3, 2010
The man explains he was knocked unconscious in the bathroom and found himself like that and that the bomber threatened that if anyone leaves the floor or calls the police, the bomber will detonate the bombs on that floor. He discloses the bomber's demands, to find the sender of thirteen red shirts. Meanwhile, Jodie has been searching for evidence of Akai in the department store. While Conan and Kogoro investigate, Conan discovers from the receipt that the shirts were bought on different days but always at 12:28 and that there are creases on the thirteen red shirts. At the same time, the Black Organization waits outside the department store with snipers waiting for Akai. Gin holds a gun to Kir's head explaining that if Akai is alive, he will kill her.
580	15	"The Black Time Limit Drawing Near"; Transliteration: "Semaru Kuro no Taimurimitto" (Japanese: 迫る黒の刻限)	Nobuharu Kamanaka	N/A	July 10, 2010
Conan arranges the red shirts in the order they were sent and folds them along the creases and deduces that the way the shirts were folded reveal a code. Elsewhere, Jodie spots Akai is on the floor where the bombing incident is taking place. Conan uses the cashier room's computer in order to search for a disaster that occurred in a snowy mountain on December 28. Okiya, who happens to be on the same floor, examines the red shirt and concludes the sender is related to a disaster that occurred on a snowy mountain and smiles slyly when he notices Akai in the crowd. Conan tranquilizes Kogoro and discloses that the bomber's behavior is inconsistent; He was desperate to search for the sender of the red shirts, yet he found the time to kidnap and strap a bomb onto the man. Conan then declares that the man strapped with the bombs is actually the bomber.
581	16	"The Red Shaking Target"; Transliteration: "Akaku Yureru Taagetto" (Japanese: 赤く揺れる照準)	Minoru Tozawa	N/A	July 17, 2010
Conan explains it would be impossible to always have a shirt bought on 12:28 for all thirteen days and reveals the sender to be the cashier, Mai Seta. Seta reveals that the bomber murdered her father thirteen years ago in order to hide the fact he was embezzling money from her father's company. Conan reveals that the shirts creases are flag signals conveying the message "I saw you burying it". The bomber denies the murder until Conan discloses that the body must be near the cabin since the bomber was a novice at mountaineering. The bomber confesses and explains he wanted the best for his son to stop him from running away from home. Seta asks Conan how he knew it was related to the mountains to which Kogoro answers by reading the deductions he received from a cellphone text message. Conan and Ran trace the call to a man who explains he did not send the message and reveals a man resembling Akai was the one who gave him the phone. Conan attempts to catch up to Akai and runs into Jodie and Andre who reveals the Black Organization plans to snipe Akai. Outside the store, Akai looks at the Black Organization, smiling, and disappears into the crowd. Gin decides to drop the assassination commenting how Bourbon always likes to do what he pleases.
582	17	"The Night the Zombie Died"; Transliteration: "Zonbi ga Shin da Yoru" (Japanese: ゾンビが死んだ夜)	Shigeru Yamazaki	Takeo Ohno	July 24, 2010
Kogoro, Ran, and Conan are invited to comedian Asako Fujimori's birthday party, even though Kogoro failed to find her stalker. When they arrive, they discover that Fujimori has stabbed a man in a zombie mask. They presume that the zombie is Fujimori's stalker, but discover that it is Jiro Imaoka, Fujimori's partner in her comedic career. While investigating, Kogoro deduces that Imaoka wanted to scare Fujimori to worsen her heart condition and force her to retire as his comedic partner and concludes the murder to be self defense. Conan's investigation leads him to believe Fujimori made up the stalker in order to murder Imaoka. He tranquilizes Kogoro and reveals that Fujimori and Imaoka met at a nearby park, evidenced by the cockleburs found on them. Fujimori then pretended to lose her key and faked a heart attack forcing Imaoka to enter through the apartment's balcony to retrieve her heart medication. Fujimori, enters her apartment before Imaoka does and murders him. Fujimori confesses and reveals that she murdered Imaoka after hearing him plan to end Fujimori's career and start a new life. Soon after, a package arrives from Imaoka, revealing he wanted to end their career in order to settle down in marriage.
583	18	"Kobayashi-sensei's Love"; Transliteration: "Kobayashi-sensei no Koi" (Japanese: 小林先生の恋)	Masakazu Yamazaki	N/A	August 14, 2010
Kobayashi insists on escorting the Detective Boys to the fireworks festival after hearing about a series recent robberies. Kobayashi becomes lost on the way when they decide to take a shortcut and witnesses a feud between two people in an alleyway which results in one of them being stabbed to death. At the police station, Shiratori questions Kobayashi about the murder of the woman named Akira Sumida. Kobayashi explains she heard a female voice threatening to kill the other in the midst of the argument. She adds on that the culprit was likely female due to her breasts and she saw a truck with the partially covered number 09 across the alley. Kobayashi leaves to go to the washroom when she overhears some officers mentioning how Shiratori may be dating Kobayashi only because she resembles Sato and is heartbroken.
584	19	"Inspector Shiratori's Lost Love"; Transliteration: "Shiratori-keibu no Shitsuren" (Japanese: 白鳥警部の失恋)	Minoru Tozawa	N/A	August 21, 2010
Shiratori has Kobayashi listen to the three suspect's voices and has determined none of them was the voice that shouted out and storms out of the police station. Haibara explains Kobayashi must have seen Sato and heard the rumors that Shiratori is only settling for Kobayashi in place of Sato. Shiratori attempts to rectify the misunderstanding and confronts Kobayashi revealing they met many years ago in a bookstore when confronting a pair of thieves. Kobayashi is unable to remember the event and replies it must have been Sato. Later that night at the school, Kobayashi receives a phone call asking to meet her at the music room when a presence behind her shocks her.
585	20	"Timeless Sakura's Love"; Transliteration: "Toki wo Koeru Sakura no Koi" (Japanese: 時を超える桜の恋)	Yasuichiro Yamamoto	N/A	August 28, 2010
Kobayashi enters the music room where the culprit proceeds to attack her. However, she manages to incapacitate the culprit with a suplex and is revealed to be Sato in disguise. The Detective Boys and Shiratori appears revealing Sato replaced Kobayashi in the hallway and names the culprit to be Ryuusuke Kodama. The Detective Boys reveal that Kobayashi's testimony was correct, and that she mistaken Kodama to be a woman in the alley due to his long hair and the position of his arm making him seem as if he had breasts. Conan explains the woman's voice that was heard belonged to the victim, and that 09 was actually OS and stood for the first two letters of Osaka Nico Nico transportation. Shiratori reveals that they questioned the truck driver who saw the victim and Kodama entering the alley. Kodama confesses and explains that Sumida planned to kill Kodama to receive money from his life insurance to settle his debt and murdered her in self defense. The next day Jirokichi Suzuki enlists the Detective Boys to defend the amber Kirin's horn from the Phantom Thief Kid. Kirin's horn is secured in the center pillar of a secluded shrine. The pillar will only open when four electrically charged pedestals in the corner of the rooms are opened simultaneously with their respective keys.
586	21	"The Kirin's Horn That Vanished into the Dark"; Transliteration: "Yami ni Kie ta Kirin no Tsuno" (Japanese: 闇に消えた麒麟の角)	Koichiro Kuroda	N/A	September 4, 2010
Jirokichi stakes the key into the wall and awaits for Kid's arrival. Kid causes a blackout and the timed explosives destroys the windows causing strong winds to rush inside the shrine. While the Detective Boys protect the pedestals, the center pillar is heard opening. When electricity is restored, they discover Kirin's horn is missing, Conan is knocked out by a taser, and cards signed by Kid attached to all four pedestals. Jirokichi reveals that the shrine had been secretly enforced with steel and an alarm would sound if Kid had escaped through the door and proclaims Kid must be in disguise and inside the shrine; The suspects are Jirokichi, Ginzo Nakamori, or one of the three reporters. Haibara deduces from the inscribed message on the pillar that there is another method to open the pillars without the use of the keys. From the colors and Kanji on the pedestals, Haibara discerns they represent the Four Symbols: the Vermilion Bird, White Tiger, Black Tortoise, and Azure Dragon. She imparts that if something is done in the right order to the four pedestals, it would open the center pillar.
587	22	"Kid vs. the Four Divine Detective Boys"; Transliteration: "Kiddo vs Shijin Tantei Dan" (Japanese: キッドＶＳ四神探偵団)	Nobuharu Kamanaka	N/A	September 11, 2010
The Detective Boys discover Conan is feigning to be in an unconscious state to deduce Kid's motive for stunning him. The Detective Boys inform Conan what occurred during the black out allowing him to deduce who Kid is disguised as. Conan has Haibara reveal to the adults that Kid manipulated the Detective Boys, unknowingly, into opening the center pillar by having them lean on the pedestals. Haibara explains that the Four Symbols each represent a season; The inscribed writing in the pillar describes going with the flow, and when the pedestals are pushed in the order of Spring, Summer, Autumn, and Winter, the center pillar opens. She reveals that Nakamori had asked them to protect the pedestals in exactly the same order and reveals Nakamori to be Kid. Haibara discerns the cards were attached to the back of the Detective Boy's custom made anoraks disproving Kid had an accomplice. Conan stands up and reveals Kid hid Kirin's horn inside a secret pocket in Conan's anorak and had planned to steal it when accompanying the unconscious Conan to the hospital as Nakamori. Kid shoots the lights and creates a hole in the ground and uses Genta as a plug to escape. As everyone rushes outside to search for Kid, Conan realizes Kid is disguised as Genta and re-enters the shrine confronting Kid. Kid discloses his real aim was to prove he could disguise himself as a child and reveals that Genta is sleeping under the shrine. He then disguises himself as an officer and prepares to leave the shrine. Conan marks Kid with his own card allowing the police officers to identify and pursue Kid in the forest.
588	23	"The Trap of the Rooftop Farm"; Transliteration: "Okujou Nouen no Wana" (Japanese: 屋上農園の罠)	Shigeru Yamazaki	Junichi Iioka Yu Kaneko	September 18, 2010
Kogoro, Ran, and Conan are invited to assist in a rooftop farm. Once there, they discover the elderly farmer, Takehiko Nakamura, dead from a head injury. The police are brought in and the other three farmers are interrogated for the death. Conan's discovers a shattered brick with a hole and discerning how Nakamura was murdered, tranquilizes Kogoro and reveals the farmer Marie Inoue to be the murderer. Conan reveals that she hung a brick on the handrail and concealed it with a towel and lured Nakamura to it with a phone call. When he was close enough, she pulled a rope connected to the brick hitting him on the forehead causing him to lose his balance and having him fall into the corner of the water tank. As evidence, Conan explains the towel's paint mark is from the handrail and that the rope must be in Inoue's home. Inoue confesses and reveals that Nakamura killed her crop which were grown from her father's final harvest.
589	24	"The Worst Birthday (Part 1)"; Transliteration: "Saiaku na Bāsudē (Zenpen)" (Japanese: 最悪な誕生日（前編）)	Yasuichiro Yamamoto	N/A	September 25, 2010
Ran discovers a receipt for a necklace in Kogoro's wallet and discerns that he is going to give it to Eri as a birthday present. Ran decides to enter a raffle draw to win a luxury hotel trip for her parents and succeeds in winning the tickets. Eri reschedules to meet her client at the hotel upon hearing about the supposed necklace. Her client, Akiho Koukuba, enters Eri's room after getting into a fight with her husband, Takehiko Koukuba, and falls asleep. Eri arranges for Takehiko to retrieve his wife and leaves to eat dinner with her family. She returns to her room, disappointed by Kogoro's behavior and the lack of a present and opens a carbonated drink but is soaked by the can; After showering to wash off the drink, she returns and finds Akiho dead in her room. Conan notices the blood stains suggest the bed was moved, and hypothesis the culprit murdered Akiho, concealed her body under the bed and hid himself, then when Eri went to shower, returns the bed back to its original position and leaves the room. The police investigate the alibis of the three suspects, Akiho's stalker and his mother, and her husband.
590	25	"The Worst Birthday (Part 2)"; Transliteration: "Saiaku na Bāsudē (Kōhen)" (Japanese: 最悪な誕生日（後編）)	Minoru Tozawa	N/A	October 2, 2010
That night, Conan realizes how the murder was done and who the culprit is. The next day, he drops a hint for Kogoro by spilling ketchup on a food cart which creates an evenly spaced ketchup stain on the floor, miming the victim's blood stain. Kogoro has the police gather the suspects and declares Takehiko to be the culprit. He reveals that Takehiko placed his toy cars under the bed legs allowing the bed to easily slide. They evidence it with Takehiko's statement, when he said that James Dean's car was a Porsche 911, but in reality it was a Porsche 550; revealing he used the 550 in the crime. Takehiko asks how would he know Eri was going to take a shower. Eri reveals that Takehiko filled her fridge with only carbonated drink and Takehiko knew that Alcohol would make one thirsty. As evidence, the murder weapon, the ashtray in Takehiko's room, should contain Akiho's blood. Takehiko confesses and reveals that Akiho threatened to kill him to inherit his money. Later, Kogoro gives Eri her present, announcing it is her birthday. However, Eri reveals that her birthday was yesterday, and that Kogoro assumed Health and Sports Day was the same day as her birthday. Conan explains that Health and Sports Day used to be on every October 10th, but was changed to the second Monday of October at some point. Kogoro is disappointed his plan of lowering Eri's expectation and surprising her with her present has failed, but Eri happily accepts her gift and kisses him. The next day, Eri angrily phones asking why she received prayer beads as if Kogoro wanted her dead. Kogoro then notices that the real present was in his desk.
591	26	"The House with the Aquarium"; Transliteration: "Suizokukan no aru Ie" (Japanese: 水族館のある家)	Masakazu Yamazaki Tomomi Ikeda	Suna Sunahara	October 16, 2010
Agasa takes the Detective Boys to the house of a famous aquarium designer, Nishida. Kousuke Imura lets them into Nishida's home when Nishida does not answer the door. The Detective Boys find Nishida drowned in his bathtub. The police determine that Nishida died the night two days prior and from falling asleep in his bathtub due to alcohol consumption. Conan's disproves the theory explaining that the bathroom light was not on when they found him. The police investigate Imura's alibi which confirmed he was in Guam for the past two days at a shooting range. Conan investigates and realizing how the murder is done, impersonates Agasa's voice and declares Imura the murderer. He explains that Imura used the cooler from the shrimp's tank to fake the time of death, evidenced by the wet glue that has yet to dry on Nishida's fingertip and the dead shrimps in the same aquarium. As evidence Nishida's contact lens is found in the dead shrimp aquarium and a nitrous acid reaction reveals gunpowder was found on Imura's shirt and the cooler. Imura confesses and reveals he had been designing Nishida's aquarium for the past five years and that he murdered Nishida when he learned that he was going to be replaced.
592	27	"The Detective Memoir of Monkey and Rake (Part 1)"; Transliteration: "Saru to Kumade no tori Butsujou (Zenpen)" (Japanese: 猿と熊手のトリ物帖（前編）)	Koichiro Kuroda	N/A	October 23, 2010
Kogoro and Conan are taken by Ran and Sonoko to a Rooster Festival. Ran and Sonoko sneak off to have their love fortunes predicted. Sonoko reads Ran's fortune which strongly suggests her to be feminine and avoid mannish conducts. Sonoko is then robbed by a man wearing a hyottoko mask who flees with her purse towards Ran. Ran, hesitant by her love fortune, does not incapacitate him with karate and allows him to escape. Kogoro explains the man has been dubbed as the Rooster Man and is a serial robber at Rooster Festivals. Ran and Sonoko takes Conan with them to visit the festival again to have their love fortunes retold. A woman's scream is heard and they discover that the Rooster Man was spotted and stabbed a man before escaping. Before losing consciousness, the stabbed man, Shiro Masuko, tells Conan it is not rooster but saru (猿, lit. monkey) and shows him nine fingers. Conan investigates the backpack left behind by the Rooster Man and discovers all the possessions stolen by him. The police arrive and are able to narrow down the Rooster Man to three suspects after witnessing him run into the bathroom. Ran finds a button belonging to the Rooster Man from her previous encounter and has the police investigate which suspect is the owner of the button.
593	28	"The Detective Memoir of Monkey and Rake (Part 2)"; Transliteration: "Saru to Kumade no tori Butsujou (Kōhen)" (Japanese: 猿と熊手のトリ物帖（後編）)	Shigeru Yamazaki	N/A	October 30, 2010
It was discovered the button did not belong to any of the suspects. As Conan investigates, he is able to deduce Masuko's message when he realizes it is related to the Chinese zodiac and reveals to Kogoro that the culprit is Shinji Mizunoe. Conan explains that the ninth sign of the Chinese zodiac refers to Monkey and is written as shin (申, lit.) in Han. Nine also dictates the Sexagenary cycle where the ninth celestial stem Rén (壬) can be read in as Mizunoe in Kunyomi. As for Mizunoe's alibi, Conan explains Masuko was the original Rooster Man and Mizunoe only impersonated him in an attempt to murder him. Conan suggests to Kogoro to have the police investigate to see if the button belongs to Masuko. They discover Ran has the button and realize Mizunoe may attack her for it. Ran is tasered by Mizunoe and has her wallet taken from her. Before killing her, Mizunoe finds Ran's love fortune and reads its content which suggests Ran to be herself. Ran realizes Sonoko read her own love fortune in place of hers; With her hesitation gone for mannish conduct, Ran easily incapacitates Mizunoe.
594	29	"The Seven Wonders of the Hiroshima Miyajima Tour (Miyajima Part)"; Transliteration: "Hiroshima Miyajima Nanafushigi tsuā (Miyajima hen)" (Japanese: 広島宮島七不思議ツアー（宮島編）)	Nobuharu Kamanaka	Junichi Miyashita	November 6, 2010
Conan, Ran, and Kogoro arrive in Hiroshima to meet a film crew who plan to film them touring Miyajima, Hiroshima. The assistant producer, Yuuichi Kitamura, gets a severe stomach pain that causes him to be bedridden. They take a ferry to Miyajima and begin filming. In front of Itsukushima Shrine, a crew member finds out salt was added to his drink; the film crew then notice a familiar man in a crowd and assume him to be at fault. One of the crew tells Conan that man may be probing the crew since it is suspected one of them is running an illegal casino. The film crew arrives at a red-leaf bun pastry shop owned by Yayoi Ayase which has a specialty of red-leaf bun called Misen's Seven Wonders, based on the seven wonders of Mount Misen: The eternal flame of Daishō-in, The plum tree grown from Kūkai's khakkhara, a boulder that ebb and flows the salt water of Hiroshima Bay, a boulder inscribed with Kūkai's writing, the sound of a goblin's clapping, a special cherry blossom that undergoes deciduous all season long, and lights dubbed as dragon fire over Hiroshima Bay. Conan notices a photograph depicting the crew members in the past and is told the crew were in Miyajima two years ago for filming; He then notices the man spotted at the shrine in another picture who is revealed to be Shinroku Ayasa, Yayoi's brother. Yayoi explains her parents fell to their death on Misen two years prior and Shinroku investigated the cause. Two weeks ago, he disappears for unknown reasons. As the filming continues, a crew member finds his ring tone has been changed to clappers and another has been thrown an etched rock. Conan relates these to the seven wonders and explains the salted drink is related to the ebb and flow boulder, and Kitamura's cherry blossom tie is related to Misen's cherry blossom tree. A crew is found bludgeoned with a khakkhara and Yayoi's bakery is set ablaze; the witnesses claims it is the work of Shinroku.
595	30	"The Seven Wonders of the Hiroshima Miyajima Tour (Hiroshima Part)"; Transliteration: "Hiroshima Miyajima Nanafushigi tsuā (Hiroshima hen)" (Japanese: 広島宮島七不思議ツアー（広島編）)	Minoru Tozawa	Junichi Miyashita	November 13, 2010
Realizing only the wonder left is the dragon fire, the film crew decide to let Kogoro investigate in order to stop Shinroku before he attacks them again. As they learn more about Shinroku, the director is stabbed with a dragon designed dagger and hospitalized as a result. That night at the hotel, the culprit attempts to sneak into a room and attack someone but is ambushed by the crew and police. They reveal they moved that person away and declare the culprit to be Yuuichi Kitamura. Conan tranquilizes Kogoro and reveals Kitamura was the cause of Yayoi's parent's deaths as he had been hiking in a dangerous area and a button of his was found by Shinroku. Shinroku realized who the button belonged to two weeks prior when he saw a picture of the old crew and investigated Kitamura in Tokyo. When Shinroku met with Kitamura in Hiroshima, Kitamura drugged him with sleeping pills and disguised him as himself to establish an alibi. Kitamura then disguised himself as Shinroku and followed the film crew to Miyajima. Shinroku, the man who was moved, appears and confirms Conan's deduction. Conan continues and explains Kitamura was also the one leading the illegal casino. Kitamura confesses to all three crimes and laments he lost control of the three situations and his solutions to them were immoral.
596	31	"The Alibi of the Fall"; Transliteration: "Tenraku no Aribai" (Japanese: 転落のアリバイ)	Masakazu Yamazaki Tomomi Ikeda	Chiko Uonji	November 20, 2010
Kogoro is called to meet with Toshio Higashiyama at his company building and takes Ran and Conan with him. Upon entering the building, they are asked to call his sectional number, 423. After getting in contact with him on the phone, they witness the employee Fujihiko Takahaka, fall from the building to his death. The police are called to the scene and enter Takahaka's office discovering a typed suicide note. Conan notices the window is open, a dry spot over the ledge of the window, and a piece of a theatrical property was found on the body and gives Kogoro hints allowing him to deduce Takahaka's death. He reveals the prop is the one used in fictional children's show where when shot with a laser gun, deflates. The prop was used to keep Takahaka's inert body from falling out the window, and was deflated resulting in his death and allowing the culprit to establish an alibi. Upon further investigation, Conan tranquilizes Kogoro and gathers the police to Takahaka's room revealing the culprit to be Higashiyama. Conan reveals that Higashiyama used an extension cord from his office building to forge his alibi, evidenced by the cord found in his room. To convict him, Conan reveals a broken pen was found in the room he actually was and that there is an ink stain at the back of his collar. Higashiyama confesses and reveals Takahaka hired his brother for work and left him with a large amount of due to hidden addendums in his contract.
597	32	"The Scenario of the Steaming Locked Room (Part 1)"; Transliteration: "Yukemuri Misshitsu no Shinario (Zenpen)" (Japanese: 湯煙密室のシナリオ（前編）)	Koichiro Kuroda	N/A	November 27, 2010
Agasa takes the Detective Boys with him to a sauna as he fixes his product. At the sauna, the kids are introduced to four cast members filming a drama about a hitman. Since the sauna is crowded, the kids decide to bathe in the early morning. As they head to the sauna, Ai and Ayumi discover the Ganji Tetsuyuma, the scriptwriter, dead. The police arrive and conclude that Tetsuyuma slipped on a bar of soap and hit his head on the rocks. Conan reveals it was a murder and points out that water on the victim's body reveal the culprit washed something off and deduces it to be blood. The police assume the culprit waited at the verandah for the victim before committing the murder and begin searching for people entering the sauna without alibis; the suspects are the three other cast members.
598	33	"The Scenario of the Steaming Locked Room (Part 2)"; Transliteration: "Yukemuri Misshitsu no Shinario (Kōhen)" (Japanese: 湯煙密室のシナリオ（後編）)	Akira Yoshimura	N/A	December 4, 2010
As the police continue their investigation, they discover a plastic tea bottle filled with water in the dressing room, match cinders floating on the water, and Tetsuyuma's silver-gemed ring. It is also revealed that all the suspects have been seen in the hotel after the sauna was closed disproving their previous theory. Conan uses his voice changing bowtie to impersonate Agasa to reveal the one waiting on the veranda was the victim and the Tetsuyuma spotted heading to the sauna was the culprit Junsaku Tansawa in disguise. Conan explains Tansawa tricked the victim into staying in the women's sauna all night in order to see the naked Mishio Natori, the heroine; This is evidenced by the bottle in the dressing room which Tetsuyuma used to stay hydrated and the match cinders used to smoke his pipe. As evidence towards Tansawa as the culprit, Conan reveals that he was completely engrossed in pretending to be Tetsuyuma that he took the silver ring without noticing. Tansawa confesses and laments how Tetsuyuma denied him of his prided role in the drama because he was afraid of being overshadowed. Later, Conan has Agasa inspect an irritation at his behind. Ai appears and reveals she placed chili pepper in Conan's underwear in revenge for seeing her naked.
599	34	"A Friend of Justice"; Transliteration: "Seiginomikata" (Japanese: セイギノミカタ)	Minoru Tozawa	Junichi Miyashita	December 11, 2010
Conan and Ran are on a train and are confronted by a pickpocket but is saved by an elderly man named Tokuma Norizuki. As the train passes Sugamo Station, they notice the police investigating something under the railway. Conan and Ran discover that a man named Kanemura, a local conartist, was killed by a head injury. Norizuki claims he witnessed Kanemura's boss, Takehiko Kiriya, committed the murder. Kiriya said he was called to the crime scene by Kanemura's friend and proclaims he is not the culprit. Conan asks Takagi to investigate on Norizuki and learns that Norizuki's girl friend, Mitsu, was a victim to their conartist group which resulted in her death. Ran is able to stop Norizuki from murdering Takeshi Motegi, Mitsu's conartist and the police arrive. For the previous murder, Conan reveals that Norizuki got off the train 15 minutes late, revealed by the exiting time on his smart card. He reveals that Norizuki used a prepaid ticket to exit and enter Sugamo to murder Kanemura and phoned Kiriya to frame him. As evidence, Detective Takagi found the prepaid ticket at Beika and had it analyzed for fingerprints. Norizuki confesses and is appalled to discover Mitsu's diary and how she forgave her conartist.
600	35	"The Dream the Kappa Saw (Part 1)"; Transliteration: "Kappa ga mi ta Yume (Zenpen)" (Japanese: 河童が見た夢（前編）)	Nobuharu Kamanaka	N/A	December 18, 2010
Kogoro receives a request from a letter by Mika Tatezato to investigate the murder that occurred at an inn eleven years ago. On the way, they pick up a teacher named Rokurou Tokobi who requests for them to stop by a grave site before heading to the inn. Tokobi explains that Tatsuhiko Numayama, a student of his, drowned in the river by the inn which is owned by Tatsuhiko's father, Banzou Numayama. They meet Kazuki Araiwa who is paying his respects to Tatsuhiko as it is the anniversary of his death. They are later approached by Banzou who tells them to forget about his sons death. They arrive at the inn and learn that Mika Tatezato is not on the guest list. They are then introduced to reporter Bosuke Nohira who explains the kappa spotted in the area is the culprit to the murder eleven years ago; Ran is horrified to realize that the characters in Mika Tatezato can be turned into the characters for kappa. They return to the grave site to search for Ran's cellphone. In the dark, Ran sees the shape of a kappa. They return to the inn and the next day, discover that Banzou has been murdered. Yamamura is called to the scene and they begin their investigation.
601	36	"The Dream the Kappa Saw (Part 2)"; Transliteration: "Kappa ga mi ta Yume (Kōhen)" (Japanese: 河童が見た夢（後編）)	Shigeru Yamazaki	N/A	December 25, 2010
As Conan investigates, he realizes how the culprit was able to drown Bonzou with swamp water in his own attic. Conan tranquilizes Yamamura and reveals the murderer to be Tokobi. Conan explains combining the water bottle and the paint bottles would be able to carry enough swamp water to commit the crime; The water was then poured into a basin where Bonzou was suffocated in. This is evidenced by the diluted paint that are currently in the containers. Tokobi professes to the murder and exclaims Bonzou ordered his son to disguise himself as a kappa and play in the river in order to attract customers to the inn. Conan clears the misunderstanding, explaining that Tatsuhiko must have done it on his own accord in secret since he burrowed a paint set from Tokobi instead of buying paint himself. Araiwa confirms Conan's deductions, explaining how Bonzou removed Tatsuhiko's disguise as to not shame his son after his death. Tokobi, realizing he killed an innocent man, sobs loudly as he is taken into custody. Afterwards, the kappa Ran saw was revealed to be Nohira who was taking pictures in the river.
602	37	"The Devil Hidden in the Tennis Court"; Transliteration: "Tenisu Kōto ni Hisomu Akuma" (Japanese: テニスコートに潜む悪魔)	Tomomi Ikeda Masakazu Yamazaki	Yu Kaneko	January 8, 2011
Sonoko takes Ran and Conan with her to cheer for her senior tennis player, Takao Goutou. Goutou collapses in the middle of the match due to poisoning and is rushed to the hospital. The ones who are suspected to have poisoned him are one of the two girls he is dating, and Sonoko who becomes the prime suspect when poison is found on her glove. Conan tranquilizes her and reveals the culprit to be the captain of the tennis team, Fumihiro Azuma. Conan explains Azuma high-fived Goutou with a poisoned glove and poisoned his hand; thus explaining why poison was found from Goutou's drink, towel, and Sonoko's glove. As a result, Goutou ingested the poison when he licked his fingers while changing the grip to his racquet. As evidence, Azuma's glove was found hidden in a tennis ball and poison was confirmed to be on it. Azuma confesses explaining Goutou injured him purposely to usurp his position in the competition and consequently made him lose his sponsors and scholarship.
603	38	"The Séance's Double Locked Room Mystery Case (First Locked Room)"; Transliteration: "Kourei Kai Daburu Misshitsu Jiken (Daiichi no Misshitsu)" (Japanese: 降霊会Ｗ(ダブル)密室事件（第一の密室）)	Shigenori Kageyama	Chiko Uonji	January 29, 2011
Conan, Mouri, and Ran are lost in the woods and arrive at a mansion where they are introduced it a fan club for Kira Miyahara, the heroine of a movie titled Blackmagic Girl who was supposedly killed in a car accident a year ago and whose body was never found. They are introduced to the club members: Kouji Yatsukawa, assistant director of Nichiuri TV; Reiki Hirasaka, the creator of the Blackmagic Girl series; Shouko Utakura the aspiring gravure idol; Yutaka Kani the president of Kira's fan club; Kazuo Hoonogi the doctor; Maho Izumi, a timid member of the club; and Ryuuichi Mifune a cosplay cameraman. They tell Kogoro that they are holding a séance to communicate with Kira Miyahara. During the séance, ghostly signs begin to show themselves and Kira's voice is heard swearing vengeance on her killers. Conan and Kogoro reveal the special effects to be activated by a remote control in Hirasaka's possession. Hirasaka however reveals that someone replaced his recording of Kira's voice with the one they heard. They learn that Kira's accident occurred after leaving from a party consisting of Hirasaka, his editor Sawanami, and Hoonogi. Sawanami was murdered months ago and was discovered by Utakura; Sawanami wrote Kira as his dying message. At night, the members receive a text message from Utakura's phone exclaiming the return of Kira and discover Utakura strangled in the locked séance room.
604	39	"The Séance's Double Locked Room Mystery Case (Second Locked Room)"; Transliteration: "Kourei Kai Daburu Misshitsu Jiken (Daini no Misshitsu)" (Japanese: 降霊会Ｗ(ダブル)密室事件（第二の密室）)	Masaharu Okuwaki	Chiko Uonji	February 5, 2011
Hoonogi reveals that he discovered Hirasaka in his room dead. Kogoro breaks open the room and confirms Hirasaka died from drinking poisoned wine. The police arrive at the mansion where Kogoro shows them both locked rooms. In the séance room, Kogoro explains that the front door was padlocked from the inside and the only way out is through high window. The high window can only be opened with a switch in the room. In Hirasaka's room, a small window is found above the door but too small to fit a person through. On the floor of the room were the ripped posters of Kira from the séance room. The keys to both rooms were found in Hirasaka's drawer. The police interview the club members and discover Hirasaka, Hoonogi, and Sawanami have received threatening messages from a fan of Kira and their goal with the séance was to find the culprit. They deduce that the one sending the messages, swapped the recording, is the same person who committed the murders. Takagi shows Kogoro and Conan Sawanami's dying message written as キラ; Conan then discovers the identity of the culprit.
605	40	"The Séance's Double Locked Room Mystery Case (Opened Locked Room)"; Transliteration: "Kourei Kai Daburu Misshitsu Jiken (Misshitsu Kaihou)" (Japanese: 降霊会Ｗ(ダブル)密室事件（密室開放）)	Shigenori Kageyama	Chiko Uonji	February 12, 2011
Conan investigates the two rooms one last time and brings Kogoro to the séance room and tranquilizes him. Conan reveals that after the culprit killed Hirasaka, he locked the room from the outside, and used one of the giant Kira posters to slide the key back into its drawer and close it before ripping it into pieces and throwing it into Hirasaka's room. As for the séance room murder, the culprit used the remaining posters, rolled them up, and taped them allowing them to support his weight and giving him the support to leave through the window; a rope tied to the poster allowed him to pull it out with him outside the window and its ripped remains are found in Hirasaka's room. He closed the window with the use of Hirasaka's remote controlled appliance. Conan then points out Mifune as the culprit, evidenced by the wine under his necktie. Mifune confesses and explains he was dating Kira before she died. Using the covert listening device he planted in Hirasaka's home, he discovered Hirasaka pushed Kira in a drunken frenzy resulting in her death; Mifune then vowed to kill everyone at that party including the unnamed girl there whom he deduced to be Utakura. Izumi however reveals she was the girl at the party and that Utakura changed Sawanami's message from Mifu (ミフ) to Kira (キラ) to protect him since she was in love with him. Mifune, realizing he killed someone innocent, grieves and regrets his actions. In the aftermath, Mifune was arrested and Kira's body was unearthed in the séance room.

== Home media release ==
Shogakukan/Being (Japan, Region 2 DVD)
Volume	Episodes^{Jp.}	Release date	Ref.
Volume 1	566–569	January 28, 2011	
Volume 2	570–572,577	February 25, 2011	
Volume 3	573–576	April 8, 2011	
Volume 4	578–581	April 22, 2011	
Volume 5	582–585	May 27, 2011	
Volume 6	586–588, 591	June 24, 2011	
Volume 7	589–590, 592–593	July 22, 2011	
Volume 8	594–596, 599	August 26, 2011	
Volume 9	597–598, 600–601	September 23, 2011	
Volume 10	602–605	October 28, 2011	
