= Case Closed season 18 =

Season of television series

Case Closed
- Season 18
- The cover of the first DVD compilation for season eighteen of Detective Conan released by Shogakukan
- No. of episodes: 42

Release
- Original network: NNS (ytv)
- Original release: February 9, 2009 – February 6, 2010

Season chronology
- ← Previous; Season 17 Next → Season 19

The eighteenth season of the Case Closed anime was directed by Kōjin Ochi and produced by TMS Entertainment and Yomiuri Telecasting Corporation. The series is based on Gosho Aoyama's Case Closed manga series. In Japan, the series is titled Detective Conan (名探偵コナン, Meitantei Conan) but was changed due to legal issues with the title Detective Conan. The series focuses on the adventures of teenage detective Shinichi Kudo who was turned into a child by a poison called APTX 4869, but continues working as a detective under the alias Conan Edogawa.

The episodes use eight pieces of theme music: four opening themes and four ending themes. The first opening theme is "Revive" by Mai Kuraki until episode 529. The second opening theme beginning episode 530 is "Everlasting Luv" by Breakerz until 546. The third opening beginning with episode 547 is "Magic" by Rina Aiuchi is used up to episode 564. The fourth opening theme is "As the Dew" by Garnet Crow and used for the final episode of the season. The first ending theme is "Koigokoro kagayaki nagara" (恋心輝きながら, lit. "While Loved Shined") by Naifu until episode 529. The second ending theme beginning episode 530 is "Doing all right" by Garnet Crow until episode 539. The third ending theme is "Hikari" (光, lit. "Light") by Breakerz until episode 561. Starting from episode 562, the ending theme "Hello Mr. My Yesterday" by Hundred Percent Free is used onwards.

The season began airing on February 9, 2009, through February 6, 2010, on Nippon Television Network System in Japan. The season was later collected and released in ten DVD compilations by Shogakukan between October 23, 2009, and October 22, 2010, in Japan.

== Episode list ==
No.	No. in season	Title	Directed by	Written by	Original air date
524	1	"The Blue Spark of Hate (Part 1)"; Transliteration: "Nikushimi no Aoi Hibana (Zenpen)" (Japanese: 憎しみの青い火花（前編）)	Minoru Tozawa Koichiro Kuroda	N/A	February 9, 2009
The antidote to the APTX 4869 begins to wear off and Shinichi is about to change back to Conan. Ran holds onto him and refuses to let him go but is tranquilized by Haibara and Shinichi is able to become Conan again without anyone noticing. The Detective Boys are on a camping trip when Professor Agasa's car runs out of gas, stranding them in the middle of the mountain. A man named Gouki Sudou drives by and refuses to help their situation. Soon after, Sodou drives to his home atop the mountain and an explosion occurs. The Detective Boys arrive to find Sudou dead. The police investigate and declare the death as an accident caused by a lit cigarette and spilled gasoline which vaporized in the garage. As the police interrogates Sodou's wife, Ena Ginbayashi, Conan reveals Sudou was not smoking a cigarette and that something else caused the explosion. Due to Ena's inconsistency with her story, Conan deduces the explosion was a planned murder by Ena.
525	2	"The Blue Spark of Hate (Part 2)"; Transliteration: "Nikushimi no Aoi Hibana (Kōhen)" (Japanese: 憎しみの青い火花（後編）)	Nobuharu Kamanaka	N/A	February 16, 2009
Conan interrogates the party guests at Sodou's home and learns Ena has been persuading her husband to wear his wool sweater under his fleece jacket and to use his classic car for the past three weeks. The police ask Ena to come with the station with them so they may ask more questions. She is escorted by Agasa's car where they stop by Agasa's garage to refuel on gas. Agasa trips, spilling the gasoline, and asks Haibara to use the key and open the trunk to his car. She is however stopped by Ena who proclaims an explosion will occur due to a static shock. The garage door opens and the police reveal it was a setup in order to gain a confession from Ena. Conan reveals that the reason Ena was asking Sudou to wear his wool and fleece combination was to build up static electricity. He reveals that since Sodou's classic car did not use a remote keyless system, when Sodou attempted to lock his car with his keys, the static electricity he built up transferred from the key to the car-door's lock resulting in a spark which ignited the vaporized gasoline. Ena reveals that her motive was revenge. In the past her father had a heart attack and her mother, who was unable to drive, could not drive him to the hospital. Sodou, passing by the couple, refuses to drive them to the hospital and instead, laughs at their predicament. Her mother then died shortly after due to shock of the incident and Ena swore revenge against Sodou ever since.
526	3	"A Present from the True Culprit"; Transliteration: "Shinhannin Kara no Todokemono" (Japanese: 真犯人からの届け物)	Masahisa Koyata	N/A	February 23, 2009
Kogoro, Ran, and Conan are at their usual diner but learn that their waitress' brother is a suspect in a murder. The waitress, Azusa Enomoto, is interrogated by the authorities about her brother Sugihito Enomoto. When a package containing cookies is delivered to Azusa, she leaves to go shopping while Takagi accompanies her. Takagi returns revealing Azusa escaped from him and is deduced to be meeting her brother. Conan reveals that Touji Kawase is the murderer by revealing how Touji knew that the man was beaten to death with a rifle and not shot by it. Conan then reveals that there was a message on the ribbon of the package. Conan explains Touji sent the message to Azusa in order to take her phone which holds a photo confirming Sugihito's alibi. Azusa finds her brother in a warehouse and is knocked unconscious by Touji. Touji confesses to the murder and reveals it was to cover up the money he lost in the stock market. Touji attempts to force Sugihito to commit suicide in exchange for his sister's life. At that moment, Sato arrives and arrests him.
527	4	"The Malice Hidden Behind the Masque"; Transliteration: "Kamengeki ni Himeta Akui" (Japanese: 仮面劇に秘めた悪意)	Nobuharu Kamanaka	Hiro Masaki	March 2, 2009
Kogoro is invited by the manager of a theater to investigate strange occurrences. While Conan goes off to investigate on his own, he overhears Hiroshi Komazuka, one of the main actors, plan on switching a fake rapier with a real one to murder Robert Banno, another main actor, in the sword fight scene of the play. Komazuka realizes Conan overheard him traps him in a sarcophagus prop in the storage room. Banno sets up a trap on the stage in order to electrocute the actor named Atsushi Yabuki. When Banno learns that the fake rapier has been switched with the real one, he decides to pursue Yabuki to trade roles with him so he may murder Yabuki in person. Yabuki agrees and as Banno leaves, Yabuki reveals his plan to poison the wine Komazuka drinks during the play. During the play, Yabuki is seemingly stabbed with the rapier, Banno falls onto the electric trap, and Komazuka passes out after seemingly drinking his wine. Conan appears revealing he escaped the sarcophagus and saved them by placing the fake rapier back and tranquilizing Komazuka before drinking his wine. The three actors are then convicted for their crime.
528	5	"Might Over Mystery (Part 1)"; Transliteration: "Yawa Yoku Nazo o Seisu (Zenpen)" (Japanese: 柔よく謎を制す（前編）)	Koichiro Kuroda	N/A	March 9, 2009
Eri invites Ran and Conan to dinner along with her friend Yuuko Arisawa. Yuuko tells Eri that someone is stalking her husband and wants her to help. Her husband, Shirou Arisawa, calls her and reveals he is currently attending a wake and will be home in two hours. While eating at a hotel restaurant, Yuuko tells them she strongly admires Hajime Kajimoto, her former Judo senpai and the current coach of Japan's Judo team. After dinner, Yuuko takes them all to her house and there, they find her Shirou strangled with his necktie. Yuuko's strange behaviour causes both Conan and Eri to suspect her for murdering her husband but are unable to disprove her alibi.
529	6	"Might Over Mystery (Part 2)"; Transliteration: "Yawa Yoku Nazo o Seisu (Kōhen)" (Japanese: 柔よく謎を制す（後編）)	Minoru Tozawa	N/A	March 16, 2009
Ran decides to phone her father to ask for help, but he is busy playing Mahjong. Eri tells Conan and Ran that in the past Kogoro would always play a recording of the police siren and say he is busy solving a case when he was actually at a bar drinking. Conan and Eri realize that the chanting of the wake was also a recording. They deduce Shirou was having an affair with another woman at the hotel they had dinner at; they come to the conclusion that when Yuuko left the table, she murdered her husband, placed his body in the car and after driving to them to her house, secretly takes her husband's body and places it at the scene where he was soon to be found. As evidence, Eri reveals the parking ticket containing the time and her husband's fingerprints should be found in the car. Yuuko confesses and reveals Shirou had an affair with Hajime's wife and angered that her husband would destroy a perfect family, murdered him. Eri reveals that Shirou's affair was not well hidden and deduces Shirou wanted Yuuko to find out about the affair as he was envious about her admiration of Hajime. Later that evening, Conan finds out Kogoro used a tape recording to fake a Mahjong game in order to indirectly help Eri solve the case.
530	7	"The Truth Behind the Urban Legend (Part 1)"; Transliteration: "Toshi Densetsu No Shōtai (Zenpen)" (Japanese: 都市伝説の正体（前編）)	Nobuharu Kamanaka	N/A	April 18, 2009
A person who murders people with a hammer, dubbed "Hammer Man", has been seen escaping to an apartment after assaulting a woman. Sato and Takagi stake out the apartment and are later accompanied by Conan, Ran and Sonoko. A home delivery courier, a bike delivery woman, and a pizza deliverer were seen to leave that apartment and were then interrogated. The three reveal they did not meet their client and instead followed notes specified for them; The courier was instructed to leave the package outside the door, the woman was told to pick up the package, and the pizza man was told to leave the pizza on the table and take the money from an envelope. They then realize that while interrogating the three, no one was watching the apartment. They enter the apartment to find a masked man unconscious. Conan removes the mask and notices that the man was knocked unconscious by a hammer and deduces hammer man has impersonated one of three deliverers from before.
531	8	"The Truth Behind the Urban Legend (Part 2)"; Transliteration: "Toshi Densetsu No Shōtai (Kōhen)" (Japanese: 都市伝説の正体（後編）)	Minoru Tozawa	N/A	April 25, 2009
Conan investigates the apartment and finds the bathroom to be too clean and that there is no underwear in the dryer. He deduces that the Hammer man is trying to hide his gender. After examining the shoes, Conan finds out only one pair of shoes with a leather shift-pad. Conan tranquilizes Sonoko and uses her to reveal the bike delivery woman to be the Hammer man. As evidence, Conan reveals that the leather shift-pad shoes were designed for biking and since there was only one pair, it means that the biker is not living in the apartment. Conan reveals that since the culprit left the shoes behind, she does not intend to escape the city by bike meaning she intends to change out of the bike delivery jumpsuit in a public toilet. The police manager to arrest her and she was revealed to be targeting girls with long hair because her boyfriend broke up with her for a girl with long hair. Later, Kiyonaga Matsumoto is awaken by a nightmare from a past case.
532	9	"The Scar of First Love"; Transliteration: "Hatsukoi no Kizuato" (Japanese: 初恋の傷跡)	Masahisa Koyata	N/A	May 2, 2009
A blind rich woman named Shoudo Kuromi asks Mouri to help her find a boy who saved her life in the past; the only clue is that the boy should have a large scar across his torso. She has been able to narrow it down to two people and they are both staying at her house. Conan meanwhile notices the police are stalking the woman's house. He confronts them and finds Kiyonaga Matsumoto who tells Conan that a serial killer from a past case may be there as the killer also has a scar across his chest. During a bath, Mouri notices that the butler also happens to have a scar across his torso.
533	10	"The Scar that Invokes the Past"; Transliteration: "Kako o Yobu Kizuato" (Japanese: 過去を呼ぶ傷跡)	Koichiro Kuroda	N/A	May 9, 2009
After going over the characteristics of the boy, Conan realizes who it is. During the midnight snack, Conan uses Mouri to solve the case. Conan reveals the boy who was honest would never have taken the money. He reveals the identity of the boy to be the butler, Taisuke Houya; The boy's nickname was revealed to be "gari" because he liked to eat Gari. Later, Kiyonaga barges in and accuses one of the men with the scar as a serial killer from a past case. The man reveals that he copied the scar from a strange man a few years ago whom they realize is the serial killer. The next day, a criminal psychologist named Douji Hiramune challenges the serial killer to reveal himself. He happens to live in the same apartment complex as Ayumi where the Detective Boys are staying with. Ai later reveals to Conan she saw a mysterious man whistling "Let It Be" which is the serial killer's trademark.
534	11	"The New Scar and the Whistling Man"; Transliteration: "Arata na Kizuato to Kuchibue no Otoko" (Japanese: 新たな傷跡と口笛の男)	Nobuharu Kamanaka	N/A	May 16, 2009
Conan finds Hiramune murdered with the letter "Z" burned into his back. The police department arrive and are confused as the letter they were expecting was "N" as the previous victims had the letters "E", "S", "W" and were thought to be cardinal direction. They notice Hiramune's left hand was on his keyboard on the keys "Ctrl" and "C" and his right hand holding the wire of his mouse. Takagi and the Detective Boys decide to accompany him and his interrogation of the victim's relatives. Conan than realizes the victims share one thing in connection, Mahjong.
535	12	"The Old Scar and the Inspector's Soul"; Transliteration: "Furuki Kizuato to Keiji no Tamashii" (Japanese: 古き傷跡と刑事の魂)	Minoru Tozawa	N/A	May 23, 2009
Later, Takagi comes to the conclusion that Kibo Dokurou is the serial kller. Conan notices something is strange about Hiramune's dying message, and realizes his message indicates the person who murdered him was a copycat killer. Conan reveals to Sato that Hiramune was actually the serial killer from the past and that Nabei Eiki murdered him. Takagi who was ordered to bring Eiki to the police station was taken hostage by Eiki. Takagi is shot in an attempt to subdue Eiki and is hospitalized. Takagi is later revealed to be saved by a mahjong tile he had in his shirt pocket. Conan and the detective boys go into Takagi's hospital room to find Sato kissing Takagi.
536	13	"The Secret of the Vanished Masterpiece"; Transliteration: "Kie ta Meiga no Himitsu" (Japanese: 消えた名画の秘密)	Shigeru Yamazaki	Nobuo Ogizawa	May 30, 2009
The Detective Boys decide to investigate a spooky château but realize a man is currently inhabiting the house and had remodeled the garden. The next day, the man living in the château, Rokuro Wada is revealed to have died. They learn from Keiichi Yagami, Wada's agent who sells his paintings, that Wada had been working on a masterpiece at the château for three months. They decide to search the château for the painting but to no avail. Afterwards they are visited by Wada's old aunt Saeko Takatoo and her caretaker Mina Eguichi who reveals that Wada sent them a letter telling them to visit the château tomorrow to view the masterpiece. Eguichi reveals Wada's masterpiece is going to help Takatoo regain her memories which she lost from an accident a year ago. Conan finds a photo revealing a château Takatoo owned in the past and realizes what Wada's masterpiece is. Conan reveals the masterpiece would be complete tomorrow. The next day, the flowers at the château have bloomed revealing a scenery similar to the one in the photo. The scenery reminds Takatoo of her garden causing her to regain her lost memories.
537	14	"Kaitō Kid vs the Strongest Vault (Part 1)"; Transliteration: "Kaitō Kiddo VS Saikyō Kinko (Zenpen)" (Japanese: 怪盗キッドVS最強金庫（前編）)	Masahisa Koyata	N/A	June 13, 2009
Jirokichi Suzuki receives a letter from Kaito Kid which reveals that Kid plans on opening Jirokichi's impenetrable safe, the Iron Tanuki. The letter however is not written in Kid's usual style raising the idea that an imposter is after Jirokichi's safe. Sonoko invites Ran, Kogoro, and Conan to Jirokichi's house. After examining the security of the safe, Kaito Kid's card, in its usual style, is found confirming Kaito Kid's plan to open the safe. Conan suspects that Kaito Kid is one of the three newly hired workers of Jirokichi. Jirokichi however continues to proclaim it to be the work of an imposter, causing Conan to suspect Jirokichi as Kid himself.
538	15	"Kaitō Kid vs the Strongest Vault (Part 2)"; Transliteration: "Kaitō Kiddo VS Saikyō Kinko (Kōhen)" (Japanese: 怪盗キッドVS最強金庫（後編）)	Nobuharu Kamanaka	N/A	June 20, 2009
The nearly hired maid and adviser inform Conan of Jirokichi's strange behavior. They reveal that after dinner, two plates are always missing and Jirokichi always brings his cane with him to the safe. Jirokichi asks the maid for a hand and they head to his room. Jirokichi leaves with his bodyguard for a drive. Shortly after, an unconscious Jirokichi is found tied up and his room and a note of Kaito Kid is found on the safe. This causes the whole police force that are guarding the safe to abandon their position and chase after "Jirokichi". Conan meanwhile enters the room with the safe revealing the maid was Kaito Kid in disguise. Conan reveals the first message by "Kaito Kid" was actually done by Jirokichi asking for Kid's assistance. Conan also reveals Jirokichi purposely placed suspicion on himself in order to clear the area of cops so Kaito Kid could open the safe. Inside the safe is revealed to be Jirokichi's dog, Lupin.
539	16	"A Fool's Inheritance"; Transliteration: "Orokamono e no Isan" (Japanese: 愚か者への遺産)	Yasuichiro Yamamoto	Hiro Masaki	July 4, 2009
While on a walk, Conan, Ran, and Kogoro hear a gunshot from a house. While heading to investigate, Kogoro was unable to catch a masked man that runs past them. Conan finds a dead man with dried blood and white powdery substance on his shirt. The man, Hisaemon Yaguchi, is revealed to have died hours ago and his three sons are the suspects to the murder. After investigating the three suspects, Conan tranquilizes Kogoro and with his voice changing bow-tie, reveals that the murder was an accident. Conan reveals that the eldest son Rokuro Yaguchi witnessed his father's death through the webcam. The video shows that Hisaemon had a myocardial infarction and accidentally shot himself. Conan also reveals that after his son tried to rob his safe, he cried in sorrow as evidenced by the salt on Hisaemon. Once the police were able to open Hisaemon's safe, they find a loan contract to which the money went to his sons.
540	17	"The Day Kogoro Mori Ceased Being a Detective (Part 1)"; Transliteration: "Mōri Kogorō Tantei Haigyō no Hi (Zenpen)" (Japanese: 毛利小五郎探偵廃業の日（前編）)	Minoru Tozawa	Nobuo Ogizawa	July 11, 2009
Kogoro receives a request from a client named Ryouzou Gamou to find a witness to confirm his alibi. On the sixth day Gamou calls Kogoro and tells him he has lost hope in him. The next day, Gamou is found hanged in a forest an hour in distance away. The police suspect it to be suicide but Kogoro reveals it is a murder, as Gamou could have killed himself at home if he wanted to. After interrogating Gamou's nephew, Kyousuke Arai, Kogoro returns home to find news reporters who question Kogoro about the suicide revealed to be murder. The next day, Kogoro heads to the horse track and meets up with detective Isao Takeoka, the detective who falsely accused Gamou of a crime five years ago. They work together and investigate Ryouzou's ties and end up at his nephew's house. They interrogate Arai and reveal his motive for the murder would be the inheritance. The next day, Arai is found in his house hanged and Kogoro decides to close his detective agency by removing its sign.
541	18	"The Day Kogoro Mori Ceased Being a Detective (Part 2)"; Transliteration: "Mōri Kogorō Tantei Haigyō no Hi (Kōhen)" (Japanese: 毛利小五郎探偵廃業の日（後編）)	Koichiro Kuroda	Nobuo Ogizawa	July 18, 2009
The Police continue their search for the suspect of the murder. Kogoro is forced by a fat woman who is intrigued with him to go jogging. He defeats robbers after her jewelry and is escorted to the hospital. Once there, Kogoro overhears a patient discuss Gamou and his medical test which took place on the day Kogoro met with him. Kogoro investigates and heads to Gamou's company to retrieve a recording of the victim's voice. However, the culprit steals the recording from Kogoro and escapes. Conan tells Kogoro that Gamou filed a complain to a company and that the company has a recording of the phone call. Kogoro realizes who the suspect is and calls Takeoka to meet with him. Once there, Kogoro reveals Takeoka has been impersonating Gamou and reveals Takeoka to be Gamou's murderer. Takeoka reveals that his wife was the witness who accused Gamou of his crime five years ago. On the day his wife died, she apologized to Takeoka for her mistaken accusation. Takeoka realized Gamou was indeed the criminal five years ago and desired revenge against him. After telling Kogoro his story, Takeoka proceeds to jump off a cliff to suicide but is saved by Kogoro.
542	19	"Ikkaku Rock's Disappearing Fish (Part 1)"; Transliteration: "Sakana ga Kieru Ikkaku Iwa (Zenpen)" (Japanese: 魚が消える一角岩（前編）)	Masahisa Koyata	N/A	July 25, 2009
After fishing, Conan and the Detective Boys are picked up at a fishing dock by Subaru Okiya while the professor is busy. On the way home, they decide to explore an island named Ikkaku Rock and come upon a dead woman's body. Conan deduces, from her wristwatch bearing her name, the woman to be Akamine Hikari, the daughter of the head of a famous company. Conan reveals that Akamine was murdered and reveals that her dying message were the names of the fishes "Mackerel, Carp, Sea Bream, and Flounder" in katakana. Akamine's diving companions Ohto Rokusuke, Aosato Shuuhei, Kaita Yasuji, arrive on the island and reveal that Akamine went missing on their last diving trip but they thought she was okay due to her message "Take care of the rest".
543	20	"Ikkaku Rock's Disappearing Fish (Part 2)"; Transliteration: "Sakana ga Kieru Ikkaku Iwa (Kōhen)" (Japanese: 魚が消える一角岩（後編）)	Nobuharu Kamanaka	N/A	August 1, 2009
While Inspector Jugo Yokomizo interrogates the three, the Detective Boys try to figure out the meaning of the dying message. Conan realizes that on Akamine's watch, the word Sakana (魚, fish) is scratched out and finds out the meaning of the dying message. Conan reveals Aosato Shuuhei is the name spelt when the Kanji of fish is removed from the dying message. He reveals Aosato cut Akamine's diving regulator and leaves her on the island after promising he would return with help. After she died Aosato returns and exchanges the regulator to hide the cut and uses Akamine's regulator to leave, causing her lipstick to appear on his face. Aosato confesses his crime and reveals Akamine caused the death of their past companion Yoshirou and he murdered her in revenge. Aosato then unveils his knife and holds Ayumi hostage demanding an escape route. Subaru disarms him and saves Ayumi from Aosato who is later arrested. Later that night, Subaru is seen drinking bourbon whiskey.
544	21	"The Hand That Plays in Dissonance"; Transliteration: "Fukyōwaon o Kanaderu Te" (Japanese: 不協和音を奏でる手)	Matsuo Asami	Toyoto Kogiso	August 8, 2009
Conan, Kogoro, and Ran all attend a concert at a local department store. After the drummer, Yuusuke Nakamura, hears about a CD Ran is searching for, he tells her to follow him to the storage room where he has a copy of it. While there, they discover the lead vocalist, Yukiko WaTanbe, dead in the storage room. The band is interrogated by the police and they learn Yukiko planned to join another band. Ran tells Conan she noticed that the drum outside of the storage room changed position and Conan realizes who the murderer is. After tranquilizes Kogoro and uses him to reveal the culprit to be Yuusuke. He reveals that Ran did not see Yukiko's body but only a mannequins hand. When Ran left, Yuusuke took Yukiko's body out of the box for the bass drum and placed her body at the crime scene. Yuusuke confesses to the murder revealing he had done so in anger when Yukiko reveals her intention to leave the band which she considered pathetic.
545	22	"The Witch Enshrouded by Fog (Part 1)"; Transliteration: "Kiri ni Musebu Majo (Zenpen)" (Japanese: 霧にむせぶ魔女（前編）)	Minoru Tozawa	N/A	September 5, 2009
Conan, Kogoro, and Ran pass through Mount Fuyana on their way home and are stopped by Misao Yamamura who instilled a road block in order to catch the Silver Witch, a woman who drives a White FD car and challenges people in a drag race. When the witch drifts, the tire makes a sound that sound like a woman screaming. Yamamura reveals his grandma raced against the witch but gave up when the witch drove into the air. Kogoro decides to investigate on the identity of the witch and returns to Mount Fuyana the next day, taking Conan and Ran with him. Upon meeting the witch, Kogoro has a drag race with her but stops when Conan reveals that the witch drove into a road less area. Kogoro tells Yamamura to stop all White FD drivers and wait for his arrival. Once there, Kogoro interrogates the three suspect pairs in order to find out which one of them is the witch.
546	23	"The Witch Enshrouded by Fog (Part 2)"; Transliteration: "Kiri ni Musebu Majo (Kōhen)" (Japanese: 霧にむせぶ魔女（後編）)	Akira Yoshimura	N/A	September 12, 2009
Later that day, Conan realizes the culprits created a mirage of driving into the air and tells Kogoro they shall capture the witch tomorrow. The next day Conan reveals the pair with the fishing gear to be the culprit. He reveals they hung a red headlight on a fishing rod in the fog to create the image they are turning into a road-less area. The culprits appear and challenge Kogoro to a race but are caught when they come upon a road block. The culprits reveal that they used the legend of the witch to scare racers from racing on the mountain. When unattended, the culprits attempt to escape from the police but are intercepted by Sato and Yumi. It is revealed afterward Sato was the witch spoken of in the legend four years ago and that the tire noises were really screams from Sato.
547	24	"Two Days with the Culprit (First Day)"; Transliteration: "Hannin to no Futsukakan (Ichinichime)" (Japanese: 犯人との二日間（一日目）)	Nobuharu Kamanaka	Hiroshi Kashiwabara	September 19, 2009
A man named Ryousuke Oomine threatens Kazuyoshi Onda, the president of a game company, to pay his game designer the money he deserves. During the dispute, Oomine accidentally shoots Onda with a gun and leaves the crime scene. The next day, Ran and Sonoko take Conan out to an ice-cream parlor in the mall. Conan overhears Takagi and a police officer discuss the how a young girl has been kidnapped and held hostage by Oomine. Conan searches for the girl at the parking lot and frees her from Oomine's grasp. However, Oomine captures Conan and uses him as his hostage. While pursued by the police, the two hide in the basement of a warehouse. Conan analyzes Oomine and confirming he is un-armed, attempts to escape. An unknown man however attempts to shoot Conan but is saved by Oomine. Elsewhere Kogoro investigates Oomine's friends and realizes three other people has the motive to kill Onda. Conan realizing there is more to the case then a simple murder, calls Professor Agasa to hide him and Oomine from the police.
548	25	"Two Days with the Culprit (Second Day)"; Transliteration: "Hannin to no Futsukakan (Futsukame)" (Japanese: 犯人との二日間（二日目）)	Koichiro Kuroda	Hiroshi Kashiwabara	September 26, 2009
At Agasa's house, Oomine reveals the gun he bought was supposedly filled with blanks and it was only used to scare Onda. After Onda was shot, he reveals he threw the gun away. Conan, Oomine, Ran, and Kogoro decide to search for the gun. Conan notices a dent on a wall and realizes where the gun landed. Conan reveals that the gun landed on an automatic window washer and was brought to the roof. After examining the gun, the bullets were confirmed to be blanks and that someone attempted to frame Oomine for the murder. Conan returns to the basement where the culprit attempted to shoot him and finds a part of a gun. While Kogoro is talking with the police and the three suspects, Oomine appears holding Conan and threatening to shoot him. The suspect Satoshi Kanda tackles Oomine down. Conan tranquilizes Kogoro and while impersonating him, reveals Kanda to be the murderer. Conan reveals Kanda planned the murder after hearing Oomine and the two suspects' plans. He directed Oomine to the gun site and was the one who sold Oomine the gun. As evidence, Conan reveals that Kanda was searching for Oomine's gun and due to the window washer, got detergent and dirt on his shoes. For more evidence, Conan reveals that while firing his gun at Oomine, his gun exploded cutting his finger. Conan gives the police the piece of the gun and declaring a bloodtest will confirm it is Kanda's blood.
549	26	"The Revolving Sushi Mystery (Part 1)"; Transliteration: "Kaiten Sushi Misuterii (Zenpen)" (Japanese: 回転寿司ミステリー（前編）)	Masakazu Yamazaki	N/A	October 3, 2009
Agasa takes the Detective Boys to a revolving sushi shop. While there, Ryuuzou Agatsuma, a food critic, collapses by cyanide poisoning. When the police arrive, Conan tells them there are three possible suspects: the manager Danji Namaki; Osamu Aizono, the customer seated left of Ryuuzou; and Saikko Takemura the woman six seats right of Ryuuzou. After the police search through the customers and sushi, they were unable to find the source of the poison. The police then interrogate the suspects' connections to Ryuuzou and each reveal they have a motive for the murder.
550	27	"The Revolving Sushi Mystery (Part 2)"; Transliteration: "Kaiten Sushi Misuterii (Kōhen)" (Japanese: 回転寿司ミステリー（後編）)	Minoru Tozawa	N/A	October 10, 2009
While investigating, Conan realizes Ryuuzou was left-handed and finds out how the murder was done. Using his voice changing bowtie, Conan impersonates Agasa and reveals the wet wipe contained the poison. Since the wet wipe was left of Ryuuzou, the only one capable of switching Ryuuzou's wet wipe with a poisoned one is Osamu. Conan reveals that during the mass panic due to the poisoning, Osamu used an old sushi plate and put the poisoned wet wipe onto the conveyor belt. The scanner on the conveyor belt sensed the plate was old and pushed the plate into the trash. After finding the wet nap in the trash, Osamu confesses to his crimes and reveals that Ryuuzou posted insulting comments onto Osamu's food blog causing him to go into a depression and therefore caused his wife to leave him.
551	28	"The Culprit is Genta's Dad (Part 1)"; Transliteration: "Hannin ha Genta no Touchan (Zenpen)" (Japanese: 犯人は元太の父ちゃん（前編）)	Aisu Mugino	N/A	October 17, 2009
Genta's father is in a competition where anyone with the surname Kojima are allowed to participate. The prizes given are 10 million yen and a Japanese painting of a boar worth 30 million. The boar painting were created alongside a Japanese painting of a deer and butterfly and when the three are gathered, are rumored to make the owner lucky. The host is a rich entrepreneur named Gonsaku Kojima, who owned the three; It is revealed he lost the deer and butterfly paintings and thus decides to offer the boar painting to the winner of the competition as it is worthless without the other two paintings. Conan and the Detective Boys attend to watch the competition after hearing Genta's father making past the preliminary rounds as one of the three finalists. When it is announced the competition is canceled, Conan notices the announcer has blood on his sleeve and investigates. Conan finds out the host has been murdered by being pushed down the stairs whilst fighting over a piece of paper. Since the three finalists were the only ones on that floor at the time the three, including Genta's father, are the primary suspects.
552	29	"The Culprit is Genta's Dad (Part 2)"; Transliteration: "Hannin ha Genta no Touchan (Kōhen)" (Japanese: 犯人は元太の父ちゃん（後編）)	Akira Yoshimura	N/A	October 24, 2009
The police interrogate the three finalists and learn all three culprits share the same shoe size, voice, and were all left handed. When a gun is found in Gonsaku's bag, Gonsaku's servant reveals that the gang, Hyakki Yakō, invaded Gonsaku's house, stole the deer and butterfly paintings, and murdered Gonsaku's dog. During the invasion, Gonsaku is spared due to the gang's leader sharing the same surname as Gonsaku, Kojima. Conan deduces Gonsaku hosted the competition in order to search for the gang's leader. Conan realizes Gonsaku figured out who the leader of the gang was due to the final competition where the contenders must read a single kanji written on a piece of paper. Conan reveals the culprit to be Gankichi Kojima due to the fact he was able to correctly read the messily written Kanji which was written in the same style as the leader Hyakki Yakō. Gankichi confesses to his crimes after Genji Kojima, Genta's father, threatens him.
553	30	"The Interrogation Room"; Transliteration: "Za・Torishirabeshitsu" (Japanese: ザ・取調室)	Koichiro Kuroda	Junichi Miyashita	October 31, 2009
Two men named Fumitaka Togashi and Tsuneo Hakamada are released on parole. The next day Togashi is convicted for the murder of parole officer Takehiko Sakuraba. Kogoro attempts to persuade Togashi who has taken an oath of silence to tell him everything about the murder. Conan with Takagi's help investigates the crime scene. He notices that there are two blood puddles, all fingerprint has been cleaned off, and that the murder weapon was found near a shattered mirror. They decide to search convenience store cameras to determine Togashi's alibi and find Hakamda with stains of blood running from the crime scene. Takagi interrogates Sakuraba's neighbor who witnessed the murder; The neighbor reveals that during the blackout, she saw the culprit during a lightning flash who proceeded to through a weapon towards her. Conan realizing how the murder was done heads back to the interrogation room, tranquilizes Kogoro, and proceeds to solve the case. He explains that Hakada murdered Sakuraba. Hakada arrives at the interrogation room to confess to the murder revealing Sakuraba blackmailed his wife into debt causing her suicide along with his son. Conan reveals there is more to the story. He continues explaining that after Togashi failed to persuade Hakada from murder tells him to flee while he cleans the fingerprint. Conan reveals that Sakurba regained consciousness and was murdered again by Togashi. As evidence, he reveals that Sakurba's witness saw a left handed individual throw the weapon at her; Since she only witnessed the reflection, the culprit had to be right handed. Togashi confesses to the murder stating Sakuraba forced his mother into debt prompting her suicide.
554	31	"Stork Mystery Tour (Ran's Search Chapter)"; Transliteration: "Kounotori Misuterii Tsuaa (Ran sōsaku hen)" (Japanese: こうのとりミステリーツアー（蘭捜索編）)	Naohiko Kyogoku	Junichi Miyashita	November 7, 2009
Kogoro and Ran take the Detective Boys to an onsen in Kinosaki, Hyōgo so Conan can heal his sprained ankle. While there, Ran runs into a little girl named Haruna. Ran learns that Haruna by herself and accompanies her around Kinosaki and remains unaware that a mysterious man is secretly stalking the pair. While Kogoro is interviewed by a name named Kouichi Yumoto, Conan notices that Ran is missing from the group and asks the Detective Boys if they have seen her. Mitsuhiko shows them a photo he took and which reveals Ran chasing after Haruna in the background and the mysterious man. Unable to contact Ran through her phone, they discuss the probability that the man has captured Ran and the girl. Heiji coincidentally runs into the group revealing that he was hired by Haruna's father, Shuuhei Tabuse, to search for her. Heiji takes Kogoro and Conan to meet Shuuhei in an attempt to find a clue on Haruna's motive for running away from home. Shuuhei reveals that Haruna was visiting a museum when the "Rainbow Child", an art sculpture created by his ex-wife was stolen and Haruna was missing along with it. Elsewhere, the mysterious man uses a taser to incapacitate Ran and corners Haruna.
555	32	"Stork Mystery Tour (Haruna's Tracking Chapter)"; Transliteration: "KounotoriMisuterii Tsuaa (Haryouna Tsuiseki Hen)" (Japanese: こうのとりミステリーツアー（陽菜追跡編）)	Takeshi Furuta	Junichi Miyashita	November 14, 2009
Haruna is found unconscious and taken to the hospital. While her parents are arguing, Haruna sneaks out of the hospital after remembering that the man threatened to kill Ran if she did not deliver the "Rainbow Child" to him. Elsewhere, Conan and Heiji learn that Haruna was only able to read part of the letter causing her to read "Kinosaki Hot Spring Station" as "Mountain Station" and thus explains why she was searching for her mother at the mountain. After a long search, Conan and his companions are able to find Haruna at her aunt's home and capture the mysterious man. The man is revealed to be Yumoto who reveals a man paid him to take the Rainbow Child back from Haruna. Conan reveals that the mysterious man in Genta's picture is the one who ordered Yumoto to commit the crime and reveals the culprit to be the Takeshi Kamachi, the president of the museum Haruna stole from. As evidence, Conan reveals that the culprit received a stain from Genta's crab flavored ice-cream, the same stain found on Kamachi. Conan reveals that Kamachi wanted Haruna to steal the "Rainbow Child" to complete the "Rainbow" set which consists of a sculpture of a mother holding the "Rainbow Child". Kamachi confesses to the plan and reveals he needed the money to pay off his debts. Later on, Haruna is reunited with her mother and father and with Ran's persuasion, reunited as a family.
556	33	"Intersection of Fear"; Transliteration: "Kyoufu no Kousaten" (Japanese: 恐怖の交差点)	Masakazu Yamazaki	Yu Kaneko	November 21, 2009
While driving home, Kogoro, Ran, and Conan witness a traffic collision between a green car and a red car. The man in the red car, Shun Hayami, dies from the collision due to his car catching fire. While the police interrogate Seiji Kurumatani, the man in the green car, he claims that he did not see the car at the intersection which caused the accident. Conan, suspecting a murder, mentions that they saw the two cars at a convenience store and the police question the store's owner to confirm this. The store owner tells them that he saw Hayami and Kurumatani arguing in front of his store. Conan confirms it is a murder and investigates the ashtray of the green car and finds the same cigarette brand as the one Hayami smoked. After tranquilizing Kogoro, Conan announces that Kurumatani planned the murder. He reveals Kurumatani, who is an auto mechanic, was repairing Hayami's red car and was lending Hayami his green car during the time. After the repairs were finished, he called Hayami to the convenience store so they could trade cars. Before arriving there, Kurumatani adjusted a billboard at the intersection where the collision would soon occur. The adjustment caused the billboard to reflect headlamp lights creating glare for Hayami which caused the accident. Kurumatani confesses to the murder and reveals that Hayami ran over his sister a year ago. When Hayami's car came into repairs, he knew Hayami was the murderer and began his plan for revenge.
557	34	"A Dangerous Party of Two"; Transliteration: "Kiken na Futari Tsure" (Japanese: 危険な二人連れ)	Minoru Tozawa	N/A	November 28, 2009
Agasa and Haibara become stranded when their car breaks down. They receive a ride from a suspicious man and woman. Haibara suspects they are part of the Black Organization when she learns that they are interested in meeting with Kogoro's assistant, Conan and how the man wants to show them his "half-kill". While at a rest area, Haibara contacts Conan who proceeds to travel to their location on his skateboard. Once there, Conan reveals the two suspicious people to be Kansuke Yamato and Yui Euhara. At Kogoro's office, Conan explains that he found out who they were due to their Nagano dialect. He explains that "Half-kill" was an old fashion nickname for botamochi due to the fact the ingredients is only half grounded when made. Yamato and Euhara reveal to Kogoro they came to ask him to solve a murder with the dying message on the red wall.
558	35	"The Mansion of Death and the Red Wall (Three Visits)"; Transliteration: "Shibou no Yakata, Akai Kabe (Sankonorei)" (Japanese: 死亡の館、赤い壁 （三顧の礼）)	Nobuharu Kamanaka	N/A	December 5, 2009
Yamato and Euhara takes Kogoro, Ran, and Conan to a mansion. Euhara reveals that the mansion was owned by a rich man in the past; The man one day decided to search for five talented people and gave the five a room in the mansion until they have reached their dreams. Euhara reveals that six people, Shūsaku Akashi, Aoi Kobashi, Naoki Midorikawa, Shōji Yamabuki, Takuto Momose, and Shirō Naiko, referred to each others as colors that sound alike to their names. They were called Aka (赤, Red), Ao (青, Blue), Midori (緑, Green), Yamabuki (山吹, Golden Yellow), Momoiro (桃色, Pink), and Shiro (白, White) respectively. Yamato reveals that the doors in the mansion swung outward and that someone used a pile of boxes filled with books to trap Akashi inside a room. They examine the room to find one wall of the room painted red and in the center of the room a white and black chair placed back to back and nailed into the ground with the white chair facing the red wall. Yamato's rival, Takaaki Morofushi whose name can be read in Chinese as Koumei, arrives and reveals he was the first to find the body as he was delivering flowers to the late Aoi who died from a heart attack in the storage room of the house. Conan reveals that the culprit knew the door would open outwards in the house and the location of the boxes of books which means the culprit is one of the three people who used to live in the mansion.
559	36	"The Mansion of Death and the Red Wall (Item on Hand)"; Transliteration: "Shibou no Yakata, Akai Kabe (Shouchuu no Mono)" (Japanese: 死亡の館、赤い壁 （掌中の物）)	Aisu Mugino	N/A	December 12, 2009
Yamato tells Koumei to take Ran and Conan with him to investigate the four suspects. They learn that Akashi and Aoi were avid chess fan and that Aoi was adored by all her friends. After investigating the four, they believe Naiko is involved in the murder in some way and travel to his apartment to arrest him. Upon arrival, they find that Naiko has been strangled and that the culprit had spray painted the wall in front of Naiko red. Koumei then heads off to investigate the case on his own.
560	37	"The Mansion of Death and the Red Wall (The Late Koumei)"; Transliteration: "Shibou no Yakata, Akai Kabe (Shiseru Koumei)" (Japanese: 死亡の館、赤い壁 （死せる孔明）)	Koichiro Kuroda	N/A	December 19, 2009
Koumei investigates the crime scene at the mansion and realizes who the culprit is. Before he could text his answer to Yamato, he is knocked unconscious by the culprit. The building is set ablaze and Koumei is saved by Euhara. At the hospital, Conan and Yamato deduced from Koumei's incomplete text "The late Koumei" was a saying which was alluded from the Battle of Wuzhang Plains; the moral of the story is that one can have great influence even after death. They believe that the culprit murdered Akashi to avenge Aoi's death. Conan and Yamato then realize what Akashi's dying message means.
561	38	"The Mansion of Death and the Red Wall (Empty Fort Strategy)"; Transliteration: "Shibou no Yakata, Akai Kabe (Sorajou no Kei)" (Japanese: 死亡の館、赤い壁 （空城の計）)	Akira Yoshimura	N/A	December 26, 2009
Koumei regains consciousness, together they conclude that they lack the evidence to capture the culprit and thus decide to empty the Empty Fort Strategy to lure the culprit out. Using the strategy, they created the sense that no officers are guarding Naiko's apartment and successfully lure Naoki Midorikawa. Yamato reveals that Akashi had katakana spray painted on his wall indicating Naoki to be the murderer. Naiko, who was meeting his old friends to ask for money, finds Akashi and having misread the message began to spray it over with red paint cans. He realized that the message was indicating Naoki, takes a picture of the message, and uses it to extort money from Midorikawa. Conan reveals that Akashi had prepared the room to indicate the murderer to be Midorikawa even if the message was painted over. Conan reveals that the white chair was facing the red wall while the black chair was facing the white wall. This corresponds to chess piece colors where white makes the first move. Conan explains that the message tells a person to look at the red wall then look at the white wall; Doing so causes one to see a green complementary color afterimage which indicates Midorikawa. Midorikawa confesses and explains that he blamed Akashi was Aoi's death since she got a heart attack from frantically searching for a portrait of herself. He reveals that Akashi had painted over the portrait since he lacked the money to buy more painting supplies and had Akashi told her, she would not have died. Koumei reveals that Akashi was working on a new portrait for her in secret and had intended to surprise her on her birthday. Midorikawa having realize his mistake breaks down in tears.
562	39	"Rainbow Color Kidnapping"; Transliteration: "Reinbo Kara no Yuukai" (Japanese: 虹色の誘拐)	Masakazu Yamazaki	Junichi Miyashita	January 16, 2010
Kogoro is hired by the Nijimura company to investigate a counterfeit company who has been copying their styles in handbags. Kogoro, Ran, and Conan witness the president of Nijimura become kidnapped by an unknown culprit. The culprit sends the president's wife, Saki Nijimura, a ransom note demanding her to place the money in a waterproof Nijimura handbag and to meet with him on a train at a specific time. While the police spy Saki, she runs into a crowd and receives a note demanding her to throw the handbag into the river below the train. Saki does as demanded and the river carries the handbag away. The next day, the police discover the empty purse downstream and President Nijimura's body in the woods. Conan notices something strange about the handbag they found and realizes it is a handbag from the company that has been counterfeiting Nijimura products. Conan gathers the police and Kogoro to the scene and tranquilizes Kogoro to reveal that the handbag actually sank to the bottom of the river and that Saki had staged the kidnapping and the ransom note. Saki confesses and reveals that the president had been selling off her designs for the handbags to the counterfeit companies and that he had gambled their family into debt.
563	40	"Detective Boys vs. Robber Group (Turmoil)"; Transliteration: "Tanteidan VS Goutoudan (Souzen)" (Japanese: 探偵団VS強盗団 （騒然）)	Minoru Tozawa	N/A	January 23, 2010
Jodie Starling sees the deceased Shuichi Akai but dismisses it as an illusion. She heads to the bank to withdraw some money when a bank robbery occurs. The bank robbers begin taking cellphones away from the bankers and separates them into two groups, one group has bankers with relatives or friends, and the others are those without. One of the bankers happens to be Akai causing Jodie to realize the possibility that he survived the assassination by the Black Organization. Jodie manages to lure one of the robbers to the bathroom and incapacitate him and finds the Detective Boys hiding in the stalls. Jodie tells Conan the bank robber's are separating people and taping their mouth and eyes. She is knocked out by one of the robbers from behind who then hide the body of the incapacitated robber in one of the bathroom and disguise him as a normal banker. Conan and the Detective Boys then formulate a plan to capture the four bank robbers.
564	41	"Detective Boys vs. Burglar Gang (Silence)"; Transliteration: "Tanteidan VS Goutoudan (Chinmoku)" (Japanese: 探偵団VS強盗団 （沈黙）)	Nobuharu Kamanaka	N/A	January 30, 2010
Conan manages to incapacitate one of the robbers and realizes the robber had changed into his clothes and realizes that the robbers plan to escape the bank by pretending to be the hostages. Conan reveals to the Detective Boys that from the evidence of the robbers dialogue, they plan to choose five hostages, without friends or relatives, and disguise them as the bank robbers where the real robbers will then detonate an explosive and kill the five chosen hostages. The Detective Boys manage to detonate the explosives safely in an elevator and Conan manages to locate the three robbers who have mingled into the crowd. However, Conan is grabbed by a robber who regained consciousness and is about to be killed until the robber is shot by Akai. The gunshot causes the police to infiltrate the bank and arrest the robbers. While Conan wonders who shot the robber, Jodie realizes it could only have been Akai.
565	42	"The Eyewitness Who Did Not See"; Transliteration: "Mite nai Mokugekisha" (Japanese: 見てない目撃者)	Akio Kawamura	Masaki Tsuji	February 6, 2010
Kogoro enters a barber shop and rests in a chair with a towel over his face. A few minutes later, a statue breaks and the owner, Ebihara, is found dead with a poisoned dart through his heart. Conan investigates and realizes who the murderer is. He tranquilizes Kogoro to reveal that Masao Noda, the man who selpt in the chair beside him before the murder. Conan reveals that Noda had murdered Ebihara beforehand and explains Ebihara was the man in the chair when Kogoro entered the shop. Noda, disguised as Ebihara, was the one who invited Kogoro to the barber shop and covered his face with a towel. Noda then switched places with Ebihara and used aimed a dart to knock down some pottery to create catch Kogoro's attention. As evidence, Conan reveals that Noda should have the same shirt as Ebihara. Noda confesses and reveals that Ebihara sold him to loan sharks.

== Home media release ==
Shogakukan/Being (Japan, Region 2 DVD)
Volume	Episodes^{Jp.}	Release date	Ref.
Volume 1	524–525, 528–529	October 23, 2009	
Volume 2	530–533	February 26, 2010	
Volume 3	534–536, 539	March 26, 2010	
Volume 4	537–538, 540–541	April 23, 2010	
Volume 5	542–544, 553	May 28, 2010	
Volume 6	545–548	June 25, 2010	
Volume 7	549–552	July 23, 2010	
Volume 8	554–557	August 27, 2010	
Volume 9	558–561	September 24, 2010	
Volume 10	562–565	October 22, 2010	
