= Fushimi (surname) =

Fushimi (written: 伏見) is a Japanese surname. Notable people with the surname include:

- Prince Fushimi (disambiguation), multiple people of Japanese royalty and imperial family
- Chikako Fushimi (伏見 知何子; born 1974), Japanese snowboarder
- Hiroaki Fushimi (伏見宮 博明王, Fushimi-no-miya Hiroaki-ō; born 1932), Japanese former prince
- Hirohide Fushimi (伏見 博英; 1912–1943), Imperial Japanese Navy officer
- Naoe Fushimi ( 伏見直江, 1908–1982), Japanese actress
- Nobuko Fushimi (伏見 信子; born 1915), Japanese former actress and singer
- Torai Fushimi (伏見 寅威; born 1990), Japanese professional baseball player
- Toshiaki Fushimi (伏見 俊昭; born 1976), Japanese cyclist
- Tsukasa Fushimi (伏見 つかさ; born 1981), Japanese writer
- Yamato Fushimi (伏見 大和; born 1991), Japanese volleyball player
- Yuki Fushimi (伏見 有希), Japanese former footballer
