= Fushimi =

Fushimi may refer to:

- Emperor Fushimi of Japan
- Fushimi, Kyoto, a ward of Kyoto city
  - Fushimi Castle, a 16th-century castle in Fushimi ward
- Fushimi, Nagoya, a neighbourhood in Nagoya
- Fushimi (surname), a Japanese surname
- Fushimi-no-miya, a branch of the Japanese Imperial Family
