= Order of the Chrysanthemum =

Japanese order

Supreme Order of the Chrysanthemum 大勲位菊花章 Dai-kun'i kikka-shō
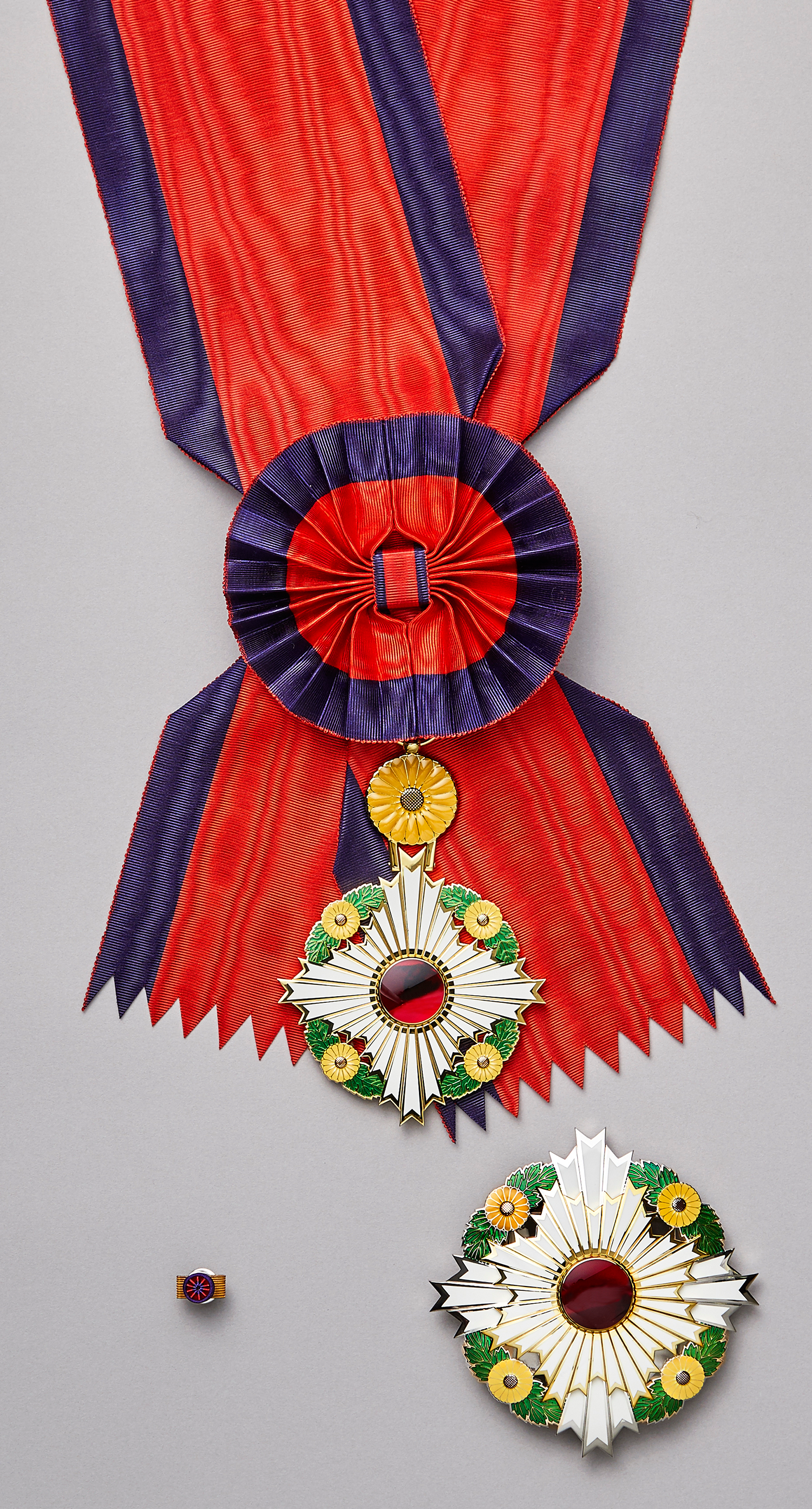
- Grand Cordon of the Supreme Order of the Chrysanthemum

Awarded by the Emperor of Japan
- Country: Japan
- Awarded for: Exceptionally meritorious achievement/service
- Status: Currently constituted
- Founder: 27 December 1876; 149 years ago
- Sovereign: HM The Emperor
- Grades: Collar; Grand Cordon

Precedence
- Next (higher): None (highest)
- Next (lower): Order of the Paulownia Flowers; Order of the Precious Crown
- Ribbon of the Order

The Supreme Order of the Chrysanthemum (大勲位菊花章, Dai-kun'i kikka-shō) is Japan's highest order. The Grand Cordon of the Order was established in 1876 by Emperor Meiji of Japan; the Collar of the Order was added on 4 January 1888. Unlike European counterparts, the order may be conferred posthumously.

Apart from the Imperial Family, only seven Japanese citizens have ever been decorated with the collar in their lifetimes; the last such award was to former prime minister Saionji Kinmochi in 1928. Eight others have been posthumously decorated with the collar; the last such award was to former Prime Minister Shinzo Abe in 2022. Today, only the reigning Emperor holds this dignity as sovereign of the order; however, exceptions are made for foreign heads of state, who can be awarded the collar in friendship.

The grand cordon is the highest possible honour a Japanese citizen can be awarded during their lifetime. Aside from members of the Imperial Family, 53 Japanese citizens have been decorated with the grand cordon; of these, only 23 were living at the time of receipt.

== Insignia ==
The collar of the order is made of gold, and features the kanji for "Meiji", in classic form, indicating the era of the order's establishment. It is decorated with gold chrysanthemum blossoms and green-enameled leaves.

The sash of the grand cordon of the order is red with dark blue border stripes. It is worn on the right shoulder.

The star of the order is similar to the badge, but in silver, without the chrysanthemum suspension, and with an eight-pointed gilt medallion (with white-enameled rays and red-enameled sun disc) placed at the center. It is worn on the left chest.

The badge of the order is a four-pointed gilt badge with white-enameled rays; the center bears a red enameled sun disc. On each of the four corners of the badge is a yellow-enameled chrysanthemum blossom with green-enameled chrysanthemum leaves. The badge is suspended on a yellow-enameled chrysanthemum, either on the collar or on the grand cordon.

Ribbon bars
Collar	Grand Cordon

== Grades ==
Name and image	Enactment date	Purpose of the award
大勲位菊花章頸飾(だいくんい きっかしょう けいしょく); Collar of the Supreme Order of the Chrysanthemum	4 January 1888	It is said to be "a special gift for those decorated with the Supreme Order." (Note: すなわち、大勲位菊花大綬章受章者であることが授与の条件である。(In other words, being a recipient of the Grand Cordon of the Supreme Order of the Chrysanthemum is a prerequisite for the award.))
大勲位菊花大綬章(だいくんい きっか だいじゅしょう); Grand Cordon of the Supreme Order of the Chrysanthemum badge (top), star (bottom right), rosette (bottom left)	27 December 1876	"Specially awarded... to those who have excellent merit, above the merit for which the Grand Cordon of the Order of the Rising Sun or the Grand Cordon of the Order of the Sacred Treasures would be awarded".
大勲位菊花章(だいくんい きっかしょう); Supreme Order of the Chrysanthemum	27 December 1876	It has never been awarded on its own, instead it has been treated as the star of the Grand Cordon and of the Collar; officially incorporated as the star of both grades in the 2003 institutional reform.

== Sovereigns ==
- Emperor Meiji (Sovereign from 27 December 1876)
- Emperor Taishō (Grand Cordon 3 November 1889; Collar 10 May 1900; Sovereign from 30 July 1912)
- Emperor Shōwa (Grand Cordon 9 September 1912; Collar as Regent 24 September 1921; Sovereign from 25 December 1926)
- Emperor Akihito (Grand Cordon 10 November 1952; Sovereign from 7 January 1989 to 30 April 2019)
- Emperor Naruhito (Grand Cordon 23 February 1980; Sovereign since 1 May 2019)

== Awards of the Collar of the Order of the Chrysanthemum to members of the Imperial Family ==
=== Awards made to imperial princes while living ===
- Prince Komatsu Akihito (5 August 1895)
- Prince Fushimi Sadanaru (19 January 1916)
- Prince Kan'in Kotohito (24 September 1921)
- Prince Fushimi Hiroyasu (29 April 1934)
- Prince Nashimoto Morimasa (29 April 1940)

=== Posthumous awards to imperial princes ===
- Prince Arisugawa Taruhito (16 January 1895)
- Prince Kitashirakawa Yoshihisa (1 November 1895)
- Prince Arisugawa Takehito (7 July 1913)
- Prince Higashifushimi Yorihito (27 June 1922)
- Prince Kuniyoshi Kuni (27 January 1929)

== Awards of the Grand Cordon of the Order of the Chrysanthemum to members of the Imperial Family ==
=== Awards made to imperial princes while living ===
- Prince Arisugawa Taruhito (2 November 1877)
- Prince Komatsu Akihito (7 December 1882)
- Prince Arisugawa Takahito (24 January 1886)
- Prince Kitashirakawa Yoshihisa (29 December 1886)
- Prince Arisugawa Takehito (29 December 1886)
- Prince Kuni (29 December 1886)
- Prince Fushimi Sadanaru (29 December 1886)
- Prince Yamashina Akira (29 December 1886)
- Prince Kan'in Kotohito (18 August 1887)
- Prince Higashifushimi Yorihito (15 July 1889)
- Prince Kaya Kuninori (3 November 1903)
- Prince Kuni Kuniyoshi (3 November 1903)
- Prince Yamashina Kikumaro (3 November 1903)
- Prince Nashimoto Morimasa (3 November 1904)
- Prince Fushimi Hiroyasu (3 November 1905)
- Prince Arisugawa Tanehito (4 April 1908)
- Prince Takeda Tsunehisa (31 October 1913)
- Prince Asaka Yasuhiko (31 October 1917)
- Prince Kuni Taka (31 October 1917)
- Prince Kitashirakawa Naruhisa (31 October 1917)
- Prince Higashikuni Naruhiko (31 October 1917)
- Prince Chichibu (25 October 1922)
- Prince Kachō Hirotada (19 March 1924)
- Prince Takamatsu (1 February 1925)
- Prince Fushimi Hiroyoshi (3 November 1928)
- Prince Kaya Tsunenori (7 December 1930)
- Prince Kuni Asaakira (25 May 1932)
- Prince Kan'in Haruhito (3 November 1934)
- Prince Mikasa (1 October 1936)
- Prince Takeda Tsuneyoshi (3 November 1940)
- Prince Asaka Takahiko (7 November 1940)
- Prince Hitachi (28 November 1955)
- Prince Tomohito of Mikasa (5 January 1966)
- Prince Katsura (27 February 1968)
- Prince Takamado (29 December 1974)
- Crown Prince Naruhito (23 February 1980)
- Prince Akishino (30 November 1985)
- Prince Hisahito of Akishino (6 September 2025)

=== Posthumous awards to imperial princes ===
- Prince Kitashirakawa Nagahisa (4 September 1940)

== Ordinary awards of the Collar of the Order of the Chrysanthemum ==
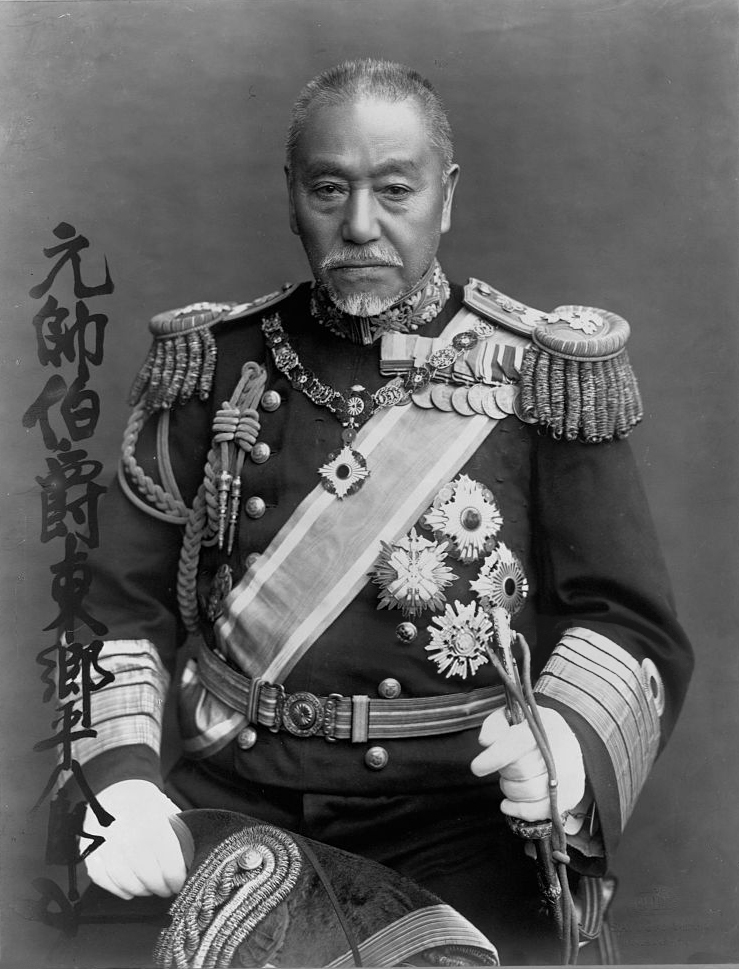
Marshal-Admiral Marquis Tōgō Heihachirō, with the Collar of the Order of the Chrysanthemum. Tōgō was one of only seven subjects to whom the Collar was awarded while living.

=== Awards made to living individuals ===
- Itō Hirobumi (1 April 1906)
- Ōyama Iwao (1 April 1906)
- Yamagata Aritomo (1 April 1906)
- Katsura Tarō (10 October 1913)
- Matsukata Masayoshi (14 July 1916)
- Tōgō Heihachirō (11 November 1926)
- Saionji Kinmochi (10 November 1928)

=== Posthumous awards ===
- Inoue Kaoru (1 September 1915)
- Tokudaiji Sanetsune (4 June 1919)
- Ōkuma Shigenobu (10 January 1922)
- Yamamoto Gonbee (9 December 1933)
- Shigeru Yoshida (20 October 1967)
- Eisaku Satō (3 June 1975)
- Yasuhiro Nakasone (29 November 2019)
- Shinzō Abe (11 July 2022)*

* : Awarded with the Grand Cordon

== Ordinary awards of the Grand Cordon of the Order of the Chrysanthemum ==
=== Awards made to living recipients ===
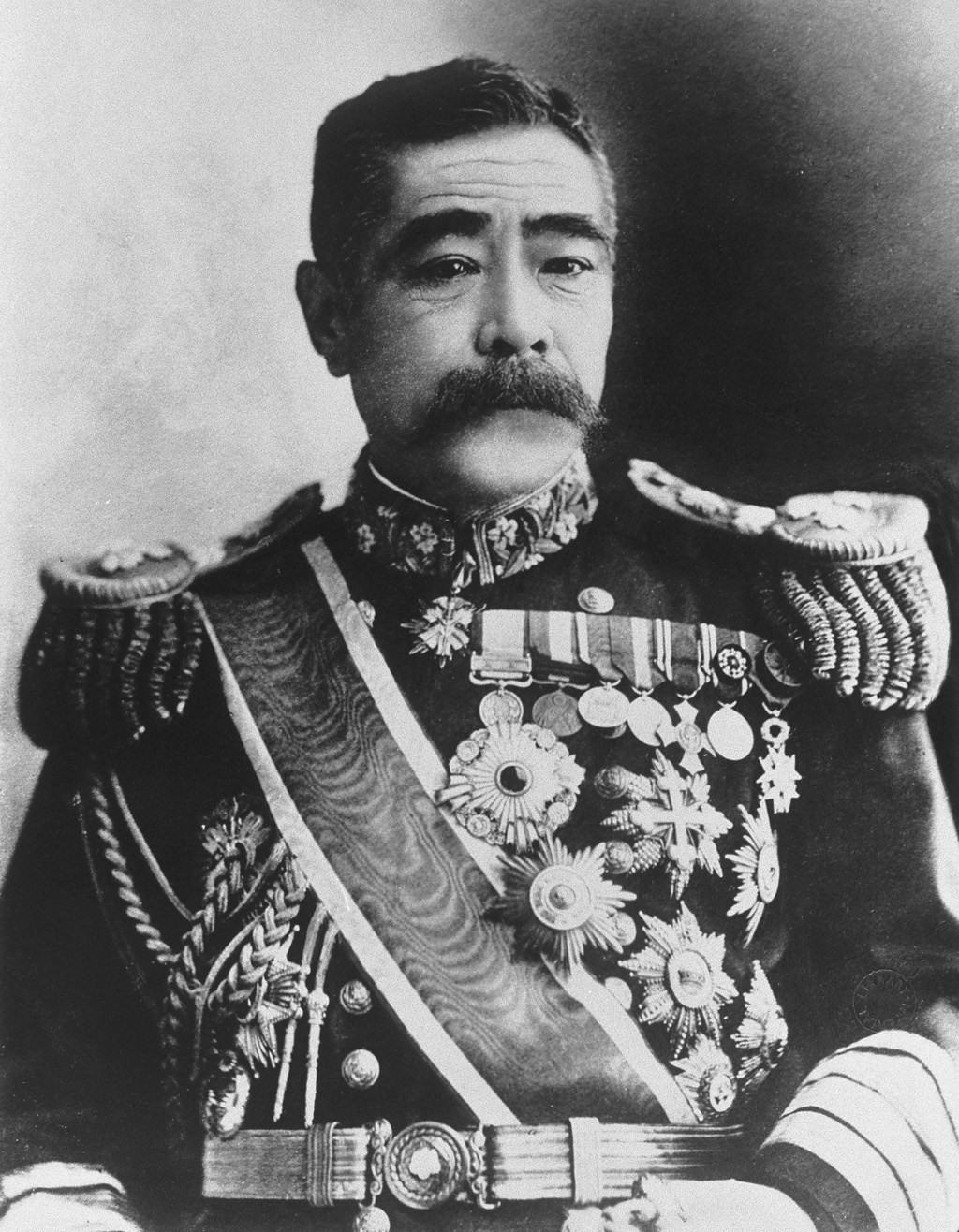
Marquis Saigō Tsugumichi

- Sanjō Sanetomi (11 April 1882)
- Iwakura Tomomi (1 November 1882)
- Shimazu Hisamitsu (5 November 1887)
- Nakayama Tadayasu (14 May 1888)
- Itō Hirobumi (5 August 1895)*
- Kujō Michitaka (10 May 1900)
- Ōyama Iwao (3 June 1902)*
- Saigō Tsugumichi (3 June 1902)
- Yamagata Aritomo (3 June 1902)*
- Inoue Kaoru (1 April 1906)⁑
- Katsura Tarō (1 April 1906)⁑
- Tōgō Heihachirō (1 April 1906)*
- Tokudaiji Sanetsune (1 April 1906)⁑
- Matsukata Masayoshi (1 April 1906)*
- Nozu Michitsura (6 October 1908)
- Itō Sukeyuki (10 November 1913)
- Ōkuma Shigenobu (14 July 1916)⁑
- Saionji Kinmochi (21 December 1918)*
- Ye Wanyong, (February 1926)
- Oku Yasukata (10 November 1928)
- Yamamoto Gonbee (10 November 1928)⁑
- Shigeru Yoshida (29 April 1964)⁑
- Eisaku Satō (3 November 1972)⁑
- Yasuhiro Nakasone (29 April 1997)⁑

* : Later awarded the Collar
⁑ : Posthumously awarded the Collar

=== Posthumous awards ===
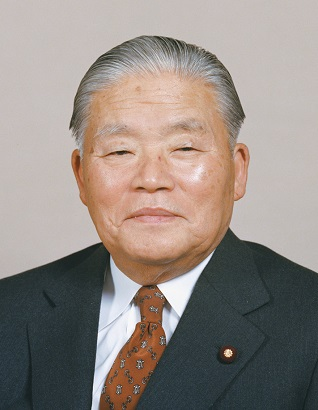
Masayoshi Ōhira

- Kuroda Kiyotaka (25 August 1900)
- Terauchi Masatake (3 November 1919)
- Hara Takashi (4 November 1921)
- Kabayama Sukenori (8 February 1922)
- Katō Tomosaburō (24 August 1923)
- Hasegawa Yoshimichi (28 January 1924)
- Katō Takaaki (28 January 1926)
- Kawamura Kageaki (28 April 1926)
- Inoue Yoshika (22 March 1929)
- Uehara Yūsaku (8 November 1933)
- Saitō Makoto (26 February 1936)
- Takahashi Korekiyo (26 February 1936)
- Tokugawa Iesato (5 June 1940)
- Kaneko Kentarō (16 May 1942)
- Kiyoura Keigo (5 November 1942)
- Isoroku Yamamoto (18 April 1943)
- Ichiki Kitokurō (17 December 1944)
- Ichirō Hatoyama (7 March 1959)
- Hayato Ikeda (13 August 1965)
- Kōtarō Tanaka (1 March 1974)
- Masayoshi Ōhira (12 June 1980)
- Nobusuke Kishi (7 August 1987)
- Takeo Miki (14 November 1988)
- Takeo Fukuda (5 July 1995)
- Keizō Obuchi (14 May 2000)
- Noboru Takeshita (19 June 2000)
- Zenkō Suzuki (19 July 2004)
- Ryūtarō Hashimoto (1 July 2006)
- Toshiki Kaifu (9 January 2022)
- Shinzō Abe (11 July 2022)*

* : Awarded with the Collar

== See also ==
- Order of the Rajamitrabhorn (Thailand)
- Order of the Royal House of Chakri (Thailand)
- Grand Order of Mugunghwa (ROK)
- Order of the Garter (UK)
- Order of Prince Yaroslav the Wise (Ukraine)
- Order of Merit of the Federal Republic of Germany (Grand Cross special class and special issue equivalents)
- Decoration of Honour for Services to the Republic of Austria (Grand Star)
- Order of St. Andrew (Russia)
- Order of the Golden Fleece (Spain)
- Order of the Tower and Sword (Portugal; Grand Collar and Grand Cross)
- Order of Merit of the Italian Republic (Grand Cross with Collar equivalent)
