= Hirohide Fushimi =

Member of a collateral branch of the Japanese imperial family

Count Hirohide Fushimi
- 伏見 博英
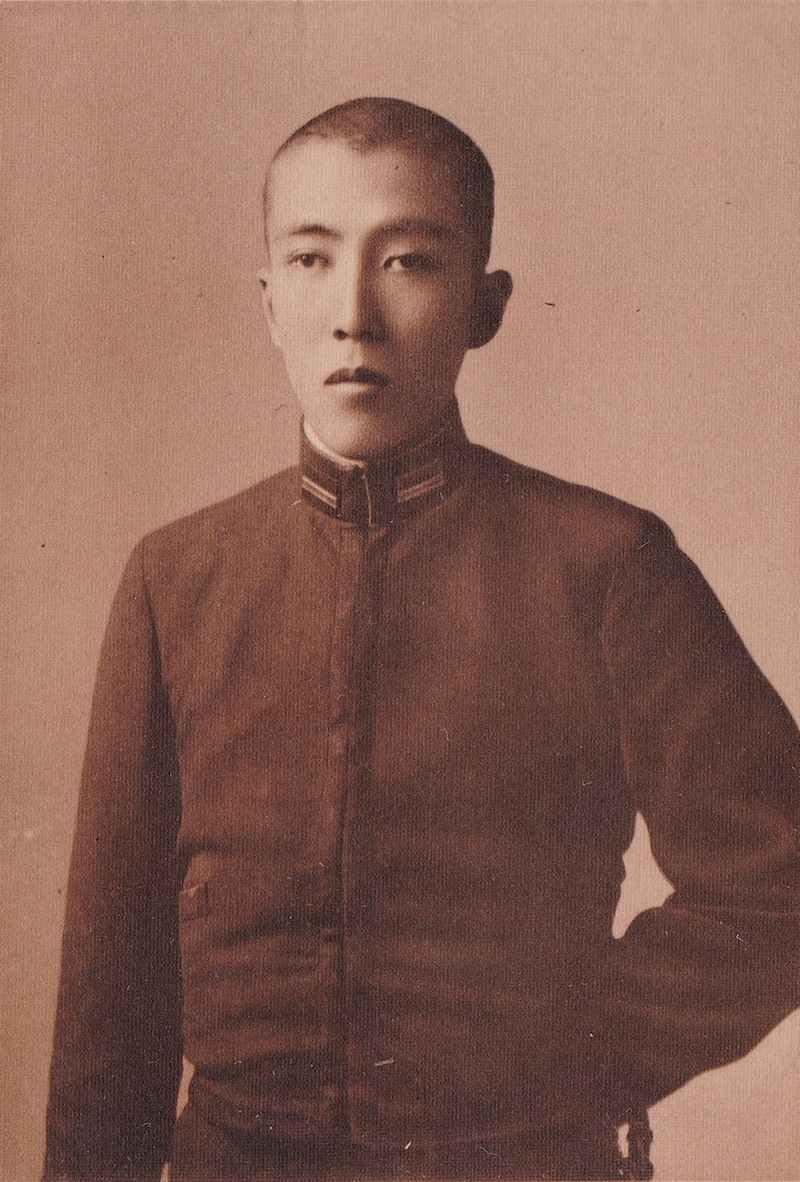
- Born: 4 October 1912; Tokyo, Japan
- Died: 21 August 1943 (aged 30); Gulf of Boni, Sulawesi, Japanese-occupied Dutch East Indies
- Military career
- Allegiance: Empire of Japan
- Branch: Imperial Japanese Navy
- Service years: 1934–1943
- Rank: Lieutenant Commander (posthumous)
- Conflicts: World War II; Pacific War †

Member of the House of Peers
- In office 3 October 1932 – 1 April 1936 Hereditary peerage

Count Hirohide Fushimi (伏見 博英, Fushimi Hirohide; 4 October 1912 – 21 August 1943) of Japan, was a member of a collateral branch of the Japanese imperial family and a career officer in the Imperial Japanese Navy who was killed in the line of duty in World War II.

== Biography ==
Born as Prince Hirohide (博英王, Hirohide-ō), the 4th son of Prince Fushimi Hiroyasu, he was the younger brother of Prince Fushimi Hiroyoshi, Prince Kachō Hirotada and Marquis Kachō Hironobu. In October 1932, he served as a member of the House of Peers in the Diet of Japan. On 1 April 1936, by order of Emperor Hirohito, he was allowed to establish his own household after renouncing his imperial title, and was created a count (hakushaku) under the kazoku peerage system. The same year, he married Toyoko Yanagisawa (29 October 1917 – 14 November 1939), younger daughter of Count Yanagisawa Yasutsugu, with whom he had three daughters. After the death of his wife, he remarried in 1942 to Sadako Kuroda (born 1 June 1915), only daughter of Baron Kuroda Nagatoshi, with whom he had another daughter.

A graduate of the 62nd class of the Imperial Japanese Naval Academy, Fushimi Hirohide opted to pursue a military career, and rose to the rank of lieutenant commander. During World War II, on 21 August 1943 while serving with the IJN 3rd Combined Communications Brigade, he was killed in action when his aircraft was shot down over the Gulf of Boni, Sulawesi in the Netherlands East Indies. His grave is located at Aoyama Cemetery in Tokyo.

== Descendants ==
1. (by Toyoko) Fushimi Mōtoko, born 11 August 1937; married Dōmoto Taizō.
2. (by Toyoko) Fushimi Kazuko, born 1 December 1938; entered holy orders and assumed the name Seikan, 1952; head of Tokujōmyōin, Kyoto; styled Abbess Fushimi Seikan.
3. (by Toyoko) Fushimi Junko; died in infancy.
4. (by Sadako) Fushimi Yoshiko, born 7 June 1943; married Ino Kazou (born 1 January 1941), who assumed the surname of Fushimi upon marriage, eldest son of Ino Noburo.
