= Prince Fushimi =

Prince Fushimi may refer to:

- Prince Fushimi Kuniie (1802–1872), a Japanese minor royal. He was the 20th prince Fushimi-no-miya 1817/1848, married and had issue, at least 17 sons and 14 daughters
- Prince Fushimi Hiroyasu (1875–1946), scion of the Japanese imperial family and was a career naval officer who served as chief of staff of the Imperial Japanese Navy from 1932 to 1941
- Prince Fushimi Hiroyoshi (1897–1938), eldest son of Prince Fushimi Hiroyasu, and heir-apparent due to inherit the position of 24th head of the Fushimi-no-miya shinnōke (collateral branch of the Imperial Family of Japan), and a career officer in the Imperial Japanese Navy
- Prince Fushimi Sadanaru (1858–1923), 22nd head of the Fushimi-no-miya shinnōke (branch of the Imperial Family). He was a field marshal in the Imperial Japanese Army
- Prince Higashifushimi Yorihito (1867-1922)
