= Kachō =

Kachō may refer to:

- Kachō Kōsaku Shima, Japanese manga (cartoon) series
- Kachō-no-miya, the Imperial Branch House miyake
- Kachō, a Japanese corporate title
