= Prince Kachō Hiroatsu =

Prince Kachō Hiroatsu 華頂宮博厚親王
- Born: 18 January 1875; Tokyo, Japan
- Died: 15 February 1883 (aged 8); Tokyo, Japan
- Father: Prince Kachō Hirotsune
- Mother: Nambu Ikuko

Prince Kachō Hiroatsu (華頂宮博厚親王, Kachō no miya Hiroatsu Shinnō; 18 January 1875 – 15 February 1883) of Japan, was the second head of the Kachō-no-miya collateral branch of the Japanese imperial family.

== Family ==
Prince Kachō Hiroatsu was the son of Prince Kachō Hirotsune.

== Life ==
Prince Kachō Hiroatsu succeeded his father as head of the Kachō-no-miya house on 25 May 1876. Due to his very young age, he was officially adopted by Emperor Meiji.

Of weak constitution, Prince Hiroatsu died on 15 February 1883 at age eight.

To prevent the Kachō-no-miya line from becoming extinct, Emperor Meiji assigned Prince Fushimi Hiroyasu to succeed to the title in 1883.

Preceded by Prince Kwacho Hirotsune	2nd Kwacho-no-miya; 1876-1883	Succeeded by Prince Kwacho Hiroyasu
