= Kachō Hironobu =

Japanese prince (1905–1926)

Kachō Hironobu 華頂 博信
- Prince (1905-1926); Marquis of Kachō (1926-1947)
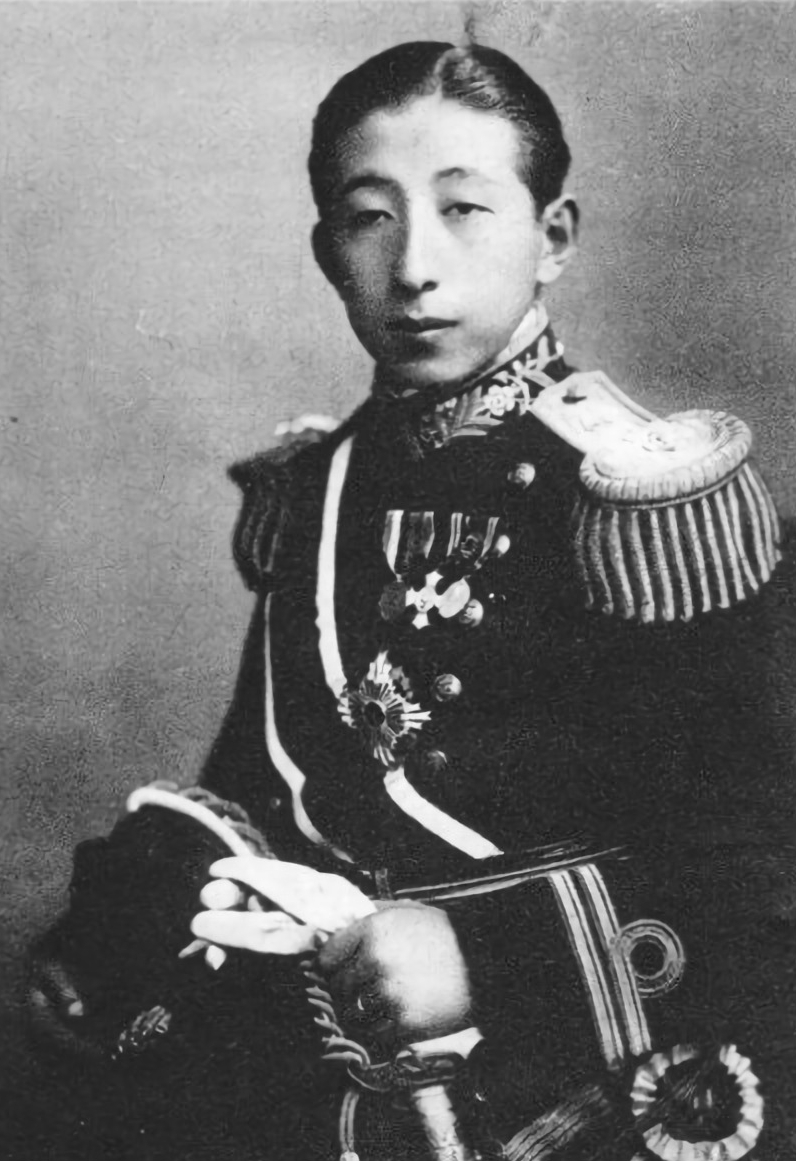

Head of Kachō-no-miya
- Predecessor: Prince Kacho Hirotada
- Born: May 22, 1905; Tokyo, Japan
- Died: October 23, 1970 (aged 65)
- Spouse: Kan'in Hanako
- Issue: Kachō Hiromichi; Kachō Hirotaka
- Father: Prince Fushimi Hiroyasu
- Mother: Tokugawa Tsuneko
- Military career
- Education: Imperial Japanese Naval Academy
- Allegiance: Empire of Japan
- Branch: Imperial Japanese Navy
- Rank: Commander
- Units: Iwate, Yamashiro, Atago, Akebono, Sazanami
- Conflicts: World War II

Marquis Kachō Hironobu (華頂 博信; May 22, 1905 – October 23, 1970) was a commander in the Imperial Japanese Navy and a descendant of the Fushimi-no-miya collateral branch of the Japanese imperial family.

== Biography ==
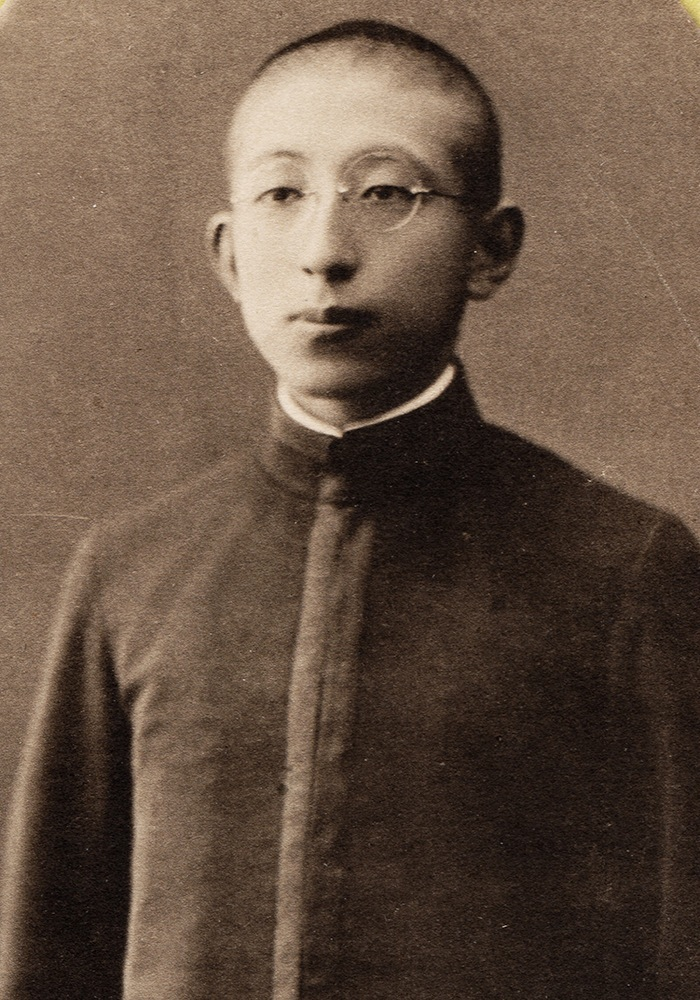
Kachō Hironobu in 1925

Born as Prince Fushimi Hironobu, the third son of Prince Fushimi Hiroyasu with Tokugawa Tsuneko (1882–1939), he was also the younger brother of Prince Kachō Hirotada. As Prince Hirotada died without heirs, the Kachō-no-miya household became extinct. Prince Hironobu was appointed to perpetuate the Kachō name, in order to ensure that the proper familial and ancestral rites were performed, but his status was devolved in December 1926 to the peerage title of marquis (kōshaku) under the kazoku peerage system.

A career officer in the Imperial Japanese Navy, Prince Hironobu graduated from the 53rd class of the Imperial Japanese Naval Academy. He served his midshipman tour on the cruiser Iwate, and as a sub-lieutenant on the battleship Yamashiro. In 1932, he was assigned to the cruiser Atago. He subsequently served as chief torpedo officer on the destroyers Akebono and Sazanami, rising to the rank of commander. In 1935, he served for a session in the House of Peers in the Diet of Japan. In 1939, he was appointed superintendent of the Naval War College, and remained in that post through World War II, retiring in November 1945.

Kachō Hironobu married Kan'in Hanako (1909–2003), 5th daughter of Prince Kan'in Kotohito, but they subsequently divorced. The couple had two sons:

1. Kachō Hiromichi
2. Kachō Hirotaka (who was adopted by Count Fushimi Hirohide)

His palatial residence in Kamakura, Kanagawa (built in 1929) survives, and was donated to the city of Kamakura in 1996.
