= Prince Kachō Hirotsune =

Prince Kacho
- Reign: 1868–1876
- Successor: Prince Kacho Hiroatsu
- Born: 19 April 1851; Kyoto, Japan
- Died: 24 May 1876 (aged 25); Tokyo, Japan
- Spouse: Nambu Ikuko
- Issue: Prince Kachō Hiroatsu
- ja: 華頂宮博経親王
- Father: Prince Fushimi Kuniye; Emperor Kōmei (adoptive father)
- Mother: Horiuchi Nobuko

Prince Kachō Hirotsune (華頂宮博経親王, Kachō no miya Hirotsune Shinnō; 19 April 1851 – 24 May 1876) of Japan, was the founder of a collateral branch of the Japanese imperial family.

== Biography ==
Prince Hirotsune was the twelfth son of Prince Fushimi Kuniye (1802–1875).

Hirotsune's father was the twentieth head of the Fushimi-no-miya, which was the oldest of the four branches of the imperial dynasty allowed to provide a successor to the Chrysanthemum Throne if the main imperial house should fail to produce an heir.

As he was born when the country was still under rule by the Tokugawa Bakufu, he was sent on 12 October 1852 into the Buddhist priesthood, and assigned to serve at the monzeki temple of Chion-in in Kyoto.

On 27 October 1860, he was recalled by Emperor Kōmei, who formally adopted him as a potential heir to the throne. However, a few months later that same year, the 14th Tokugawa Shōgun, Tokugawa Iemochi, requested that a prince from the imperial family be assigned to the Tokugawa household as potential heir to the Shogunate. Prince Hirotsune was chosen for this role, but remained in Kyoto.

The Meiji Restoration in 1868 eliminated the possibility that he would become Shōgun, and Prince Hirotsune returned to the Imperial household. Emperor Meiji granted him permission to start a new branch of the Imperial Family, and he took the name of Kachō-no-miya (from the mountain name of the temple of Chion-in).

Prince Hirotsune traveled to the United States. He studied at the United States Naval Academy at Annapolis in 1870, but fell ill and returned to Japan in 1872. On 13 May 1876, he was commissioned as a rear admiral in the Imperial Japanese Navy, but he died later that year.

His wife was Nambu Ikuko, daughter of Count Nambu Toshihisa, the last daimyō of Morioka Domain. The couple had one son, Prince Kachō Hiroatsu.

== Notes ==
Preceded by none	1st Kwacho-no-miya; 1868-1876	Succeeded by Prince Kwacho Hiroatsu
