= Kachō-no-miya =

Kachō
Origin
- Origin: Japanese
- Region of origin: Japanese

Other names
- Variant form: Kwachō

The Kachō-no-miya is the imperial branch house (miyake) established in the fourth year of the Keiō era, or 1868, by the twelfth prince of Fushimi-no-miya Kuniie, named Kachō-no-miya Hirotsune. In the thirteenth year of the Taishō era, or 1924, the Kachō family succeeded as a marquis branch kousyaku (the second of the five ranks in the five-rank imperial System, below prince but above count).

Currently, the Kachō-no-miya residence is located in the Tokyo metropolitan area, in the fourth district chome of the Mita area. The remains are located nearby the Kamezuka Children's Park, and is generally accessible to the public.

Additionally, in the fourth year of Shōwa era, or 1929, in Kamakura-shi, Kachou Hironobu established a residence. In the fourth year of Heisei era, or 1996, the city of Kamakura-shi acquired the land, and it is now more popularly known as kyuu-Kachou no Miya Yashiki, or the former residence of Kachō-no-miya. There is an outdoor garden portion that is generally open to the public.

== Kwachō-no-miya ==
The Kwachō-no-miya (or Kachō-no-miya) house was formed by Prince Hirotsune, son of Prince Fushimi Kuniye.

	Name	Born	Succeeded	Retired	Died
1	Prince Kacho Hirotsune (華頂宮博経親王, Kachō-no-miya Hirosune shinnō)	1851	1868	.	1876
2	Prince Kacho Hiroatsu (華頂宮博厚親王, Kachō-no-miya Hiroatsu shinnō)	1875	1876	.	1883
3	Prince Kacho Hiroyasu (華頂宮博恭親王, Kachō-no-miya Hiroyasu-shinnō)	1875	1883	1904	1946
4	Prince Kacho Hirotada (華頂宮博忠王, Kachō-no-miya Hirotada-ō)	1902	1904	1924	1924
X	Marquis Kacho Hironobu (華頂博信, Kachō Hironobu)	1905	1924	1946	1970

== Kacho-no-miya Hirotsune ==
Kacho-no-miya Hirotsune was born in the fourth year of the Kaei era, or 1851. As the nephew of Emperor Koumei, he was pronounced as an imperial prince. He cut his hair to enter the Chion'in Jodo Buddhist monastery, and took the name of Sonshuu. After the Meiji Restoration, he quit the order, and he established a household named after the sacred mountain, Kacho, which was affiliated with the Chion'in monastery. He was appointed in a position to oversee Japanese schools and a position in the danjyoudai, an inspection board. Afterward, he decided to pursue the path of a naval soldier, and in the third year of Meiji (1870), he spent time as a foreign exchange student at the Annapolis Naval Academy in the United States of America. In the sixth year of Meiji (1873), he returned to Japan. In 1876, he was assigned a post as major general, but at the young age of 26, died.
