= Prince Fushimi Hiroyasu =

Japanese prince and admiral (1875–1946)

His Imperial Highness Prince Fushimi Hiroyasu
- 伏見宮博恭王
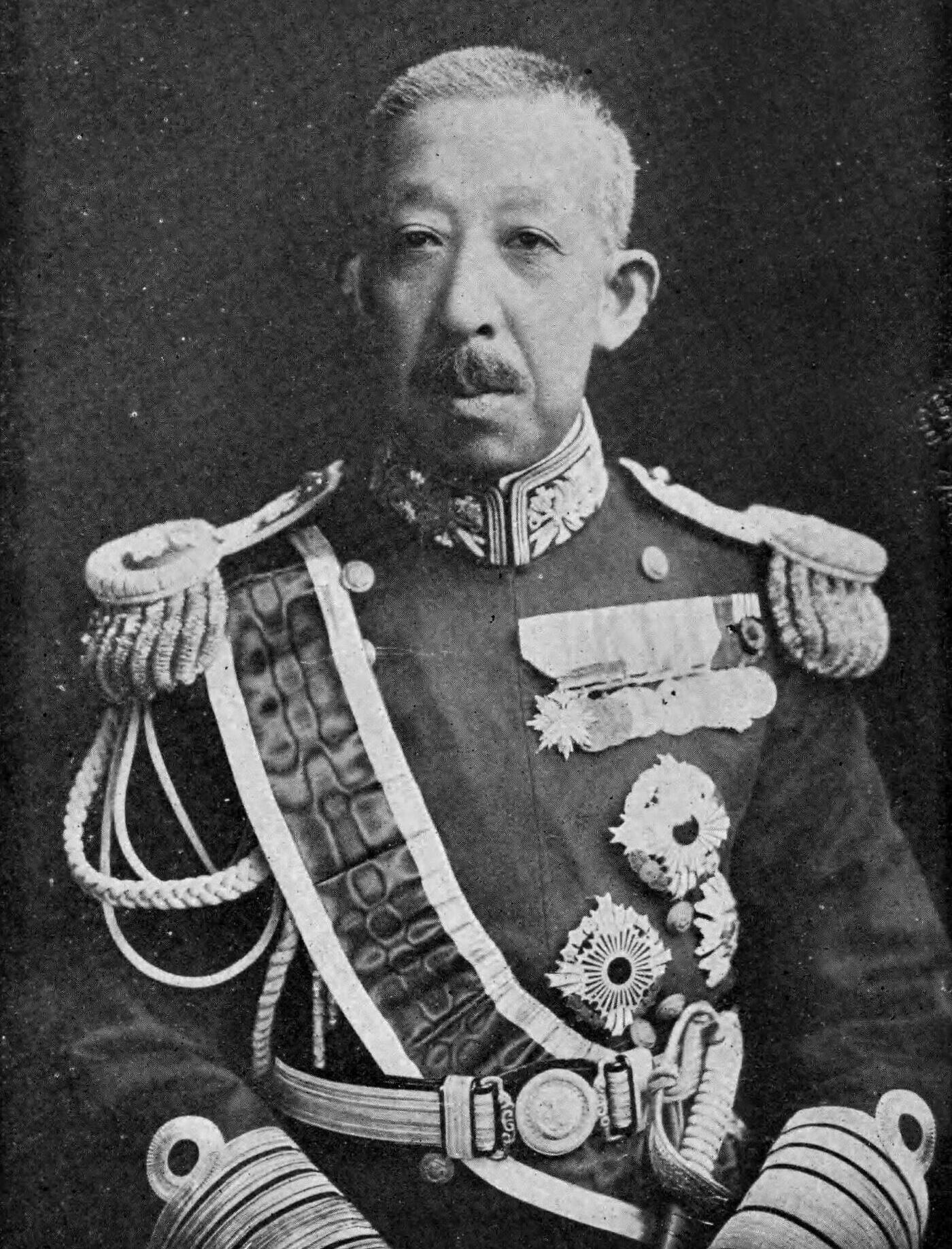
- Marshal Admiral Prince Fushimi Hiroyasu

Chief of the Imperial Japanese Navy General Staff
- In office 2 February 1932 – 9 April 1941
- Monarch: Shōwa
- Preceded by: Taniguchi Naomi
- Succeeded by: Osami Nagano

Member of the House of Peers
- In office September 1895 – 23 May 1946 Hereditary peerage

Personal details
- Born: 16 October 1875 Kōjimachi, Tokyo, Japan
- Died: 16 August 1946 (aged 70) Shinagawa, Tokyo, Japan
- Awards: Collar of the Supreme Order of the Chrysanthemum (1934); Order of the Golden Kite, 1st class (1942)

Military service
- Allegiance: Empire of Japan
- Branch/service: Imperial Japanese Navy
- Years of service: 1895–1946
- Rank: Marshal Admiral
- Commands: Takachiho, Asahi, Ibuki; Chief of the Imperial Japanese Navy General Staff
- Battles/wars: Russo-Japanese War; Battle of the Yellow Sea; Battle of Tsushima; World War I; World War II

Hiroyasu
- Prince Fushimi

Prince Fushimi
- Reign: 4 February 1923 – 16 August 1946
- Predecessor: Prince Fushimi Sadanaru
- Successor: Fushimi Hiroaki

Prince Kacho
- Reign: 23 April 1883 – 16 January 1904
- Predecessor: Prince Kachō Hiroatsu
- Successor: Prince Kachō Hirotada
- Father: Prince Fushimi Sadanaru

Marshal Admiral Prince Fushimi Hiroyasu (伏見宮博恭王, Fushimi-no-miya Hiroyasu ō; 16 October 1875 – 16 August 1946) was a scion of the Japanese imperial family and a career naval officer who served as chief of staff of the Imperial Japanese Navy from 1932 to 1941.

== Early life ==
Prince Hiroyasu was born in Tokyo as Prince Narukata, the eldest son of Prince Fushimi Sadanaru (1858–1923) by one of his concubines. He was the twenty-third head of the Fushimi-no-miya, one of the four shinnōke cadet branches of the imperial family entitled to succeed to the throne in default of a direct heir. Prince Fushimi was a second cousin to both Emperor Shōwa (Hirohito) and Empress Kōjun, and nephew of Prince Kan'in Kotohito

He succeeded to title Kachō-no-miya on 23 April 1883, upon which he changed his name from "Narukata" to "Hiroyasu," but returned to the house of Fushimi-no-miya on 16 January 1904.

== Marriage & family ==
On January 9, 1896, Prince Hiroyasu married Tokugawa Tsuneko (1882–1939), the ninth daughter of Prince Tokugawa Yoshinobu, Japan's last shōgun, with whom he had six children:

1. Prince Fushimi Hiroyoshi (博義王, Hiroyoshi-ō; 8 December 1897 – 19 October 1938)
2. Princess Yasuko (恭子女王, Yasuko-nyoō; 1898–1919); Married Marquis Asano Nagatake
3. Prince Hirotada (博忠王, Hirotada-ō; 1902–1924); Became Prince Kachō Hirotada
4. Prince Hironobu (博信王, Hironobu-ō; 1905–1970); Became Marquis Kachō Hironobu: took peerage title of Marquis and succeeded to head of Kachō-no-miya household
5. Princess Atsuko (敦子女王, Atsuko nyoō; 1907–1936); Married Count Kiyosu Yukiyasu.
6. Princess Tomoko (知子女王, Tomoko nyoō; 1907–1947); married Prince Kuni Asaakira.
7. Prince Hirohide (博英王, Hirohide-ō; 1912–1943); Became Count Fushimi Hirohide: took peerage title of Count, served in IJN, KIA.

== Military career ==
Prince Hiroyasu entered the Imperial Japanese Naval Academy on 5 April 1886, but resigned in September 1889 and moved to Germany. He enrolled in the Naval Academy of the Kaiserliche Marine on 8 April 1892. Promoted to midshipman (Fähnrich zur See) on 30 March 1893 and to ensign (Oberfähnrich zur See) on 20 April 1894, he graduated from the academy on 15 August 1895 and returned to service in the IJN. He spoke fluent German. He then served aboard the cruisers Itsukushima and Matsushima. On 1 December 1897, he was promoted to sub-lieutenant and assigned to the battleship Fuji, receiving a promotion to lieutenant on 27 December. Promoted to lieutenant-commander on 29 July 1903, he served in the Russo-Japanese War (1904–05), and sustained wounds aboard the battleship Mikasa in the Battle of the Yellow Sea (August 1904). He later served as executive officer on the cruiser Niitaka, the battleship Okinoshima, and cruisers Naniwa and Nisshin. He was awarded the Order of the Golden Kite, 4th class, for his services in the Russo-Japanese War, and was promoted to commander on 28 September 1906.

He studied in Great Britain from 1907 to 1910 and upon his return to Japan was promoted to captain on 1 December 1910. He commanded the cruiser Takachiho (1910), and later the Asahi and the battlecruiser Ibuki. Promoted to rear admiral on 31 August 1913, he rose to vice admiral on 1 December 1916 and to full admiral on 1 December 1922. He was a member of the Supreme War Council from 1920 onward. He was a strong supporter of the Fleet Faction within the Navy, pushing for the cancellation of the Washington Naval Agreement and the building of a more powerful navy.

Prince Hiroyasu succeeded his father as the twenty-third head of the house of Fushimi in 1923. He was appointed commander of the Sasebo Naval District in 1924. Admiral Prince Fushimi became the chief of the Imperial Japanese Navy General Staff on 2 February 1932, replacing Admiral Abo Kiyokazu, and held the post until 9 April 1941.

Prince Fushimi received the largely honorary rank of marshal admiral on 27 May 1932, and the Collar of the Supreme Order of the Chrysanthemum in 1934.

While he was Chief of Staff of the Imperial Japanese Navy, the Imperial Japanese Navy Air Service used strategic bombing against Chinese cities including Shanghai and Chongqing. The bombing of Nanjing and Guangzhou, which began on 22–23 September 1937, resulted in widespread international condemnation of Japan and a resolution against Japan by the Far Eastern Advisory Committee of the League of Nations.

As Chief of Staff, he supported the "southward advance" into northern French Indochina and the Dutch East Indies.

In 1945, the Americans listed Hiroyasu as a major war criminal suspect. Although he was reported dead in the War Crimes Office list, he was alive but sick.

== Honours ==
He received the following orders and decorations:

- German Empire:
  - Knight of the Order of the Prussian Crown, 1st Class, 22 June 1895
  - Grand Cross of the Order of the Red Eagle, 1 February 1910
- Korean Empire:
  - Grand Cordon of the Order of the Plum Blossom, 4 August 1901
  - Grand Cordon of the Order of the Golden Ruler, 23 May 1905
- Qing dynasty: Order of the Double Dragon, Class I Grade II, 9 May 1903
- United Kingdom: Honorary Grand Cross of the Royal Victorian Order, 25 January 1910
- Kingdom of Italy: Knight of the Order of the Annunciation, 14 February 1910
- Spain: Grand Cross of the Order of Charles III, 8 March 1910
- France: Grand Cross of the Legion of Honour, 14 March 1910
- Austria-Hungary: Grand Cross of the Order of St. Stephen, 21 March 1910
- Russian Empire: Knight of the Order of St. Andrew, 11 April 1910
- Netherlands: Grand Cross of the Order of the Netherlands Lion, 27 April 1910
- Belgium: Grand Cordon of the Royal Order of Leopold, 4 May 1910
- Siam: Knight of the Order of the Royal House of Chakri, 28 November 1911

== Gallery ==
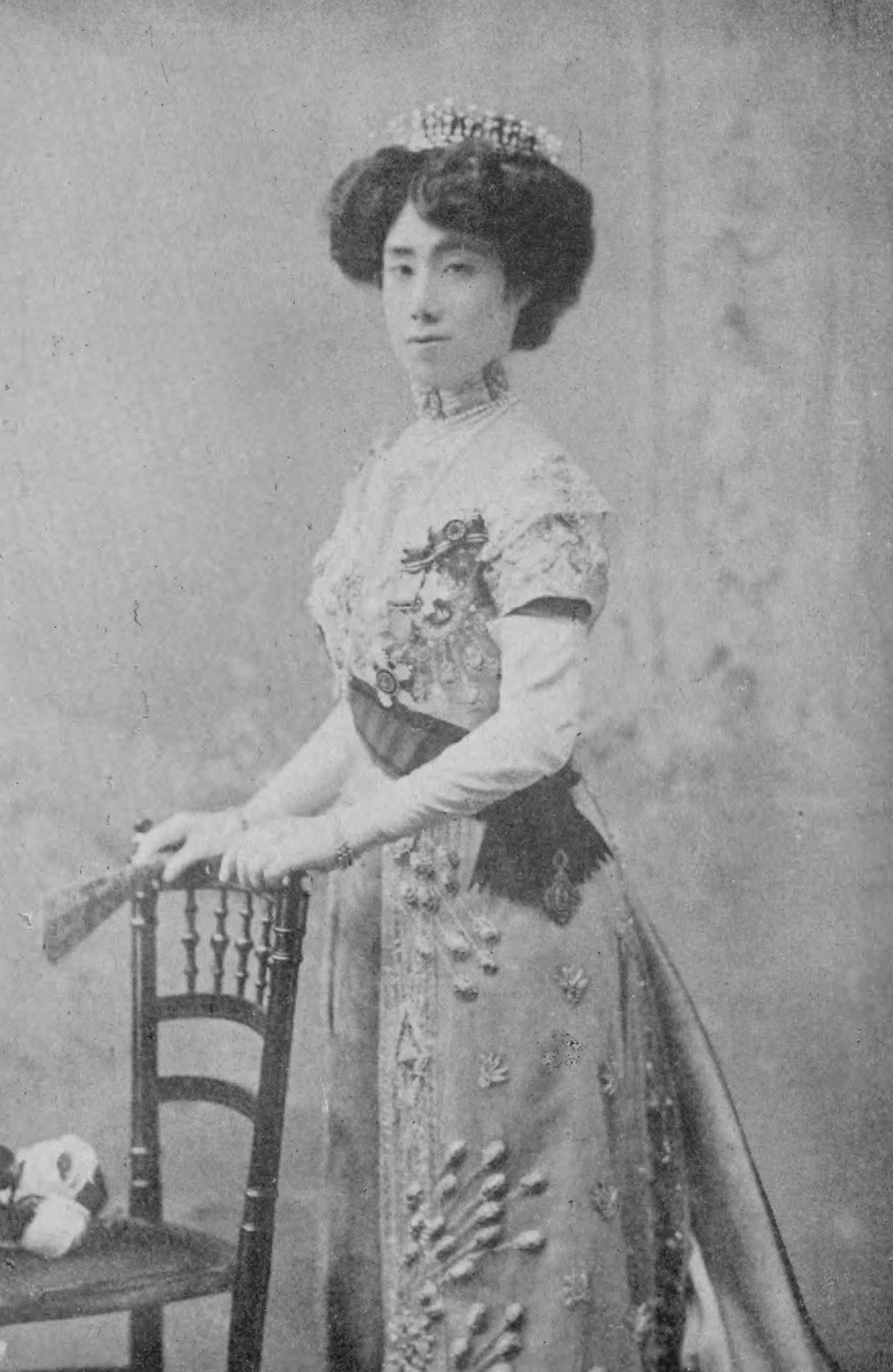
Princess Fushimi Tsuneko, consort

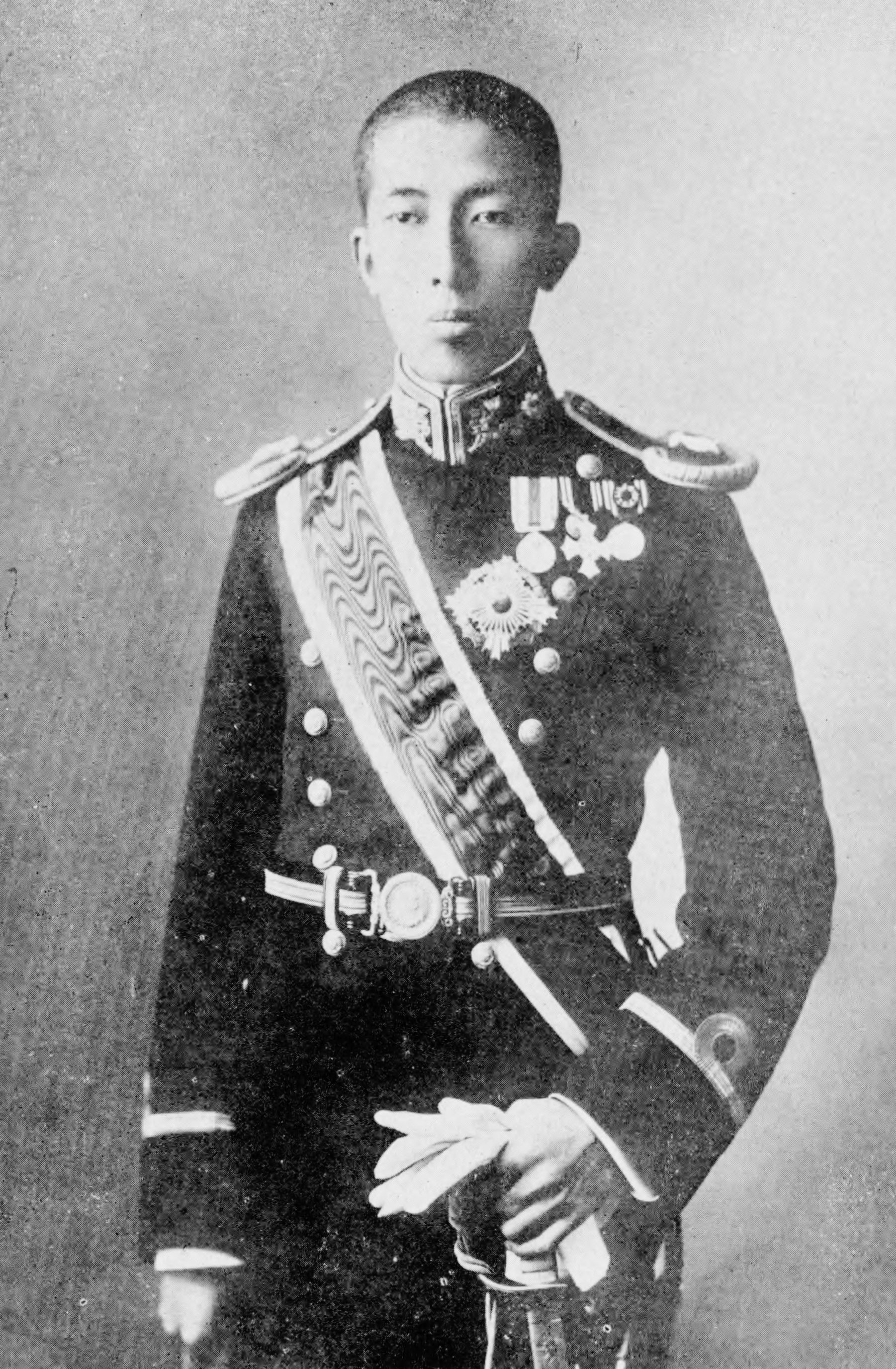
Prince Fushimi Hiroyoshi, heir

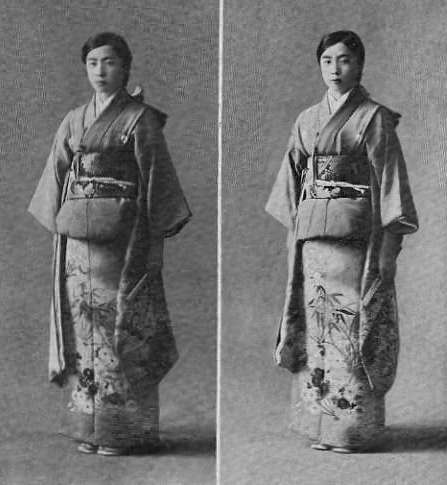
Princess Atsuko and Princess Tomoko (twins)

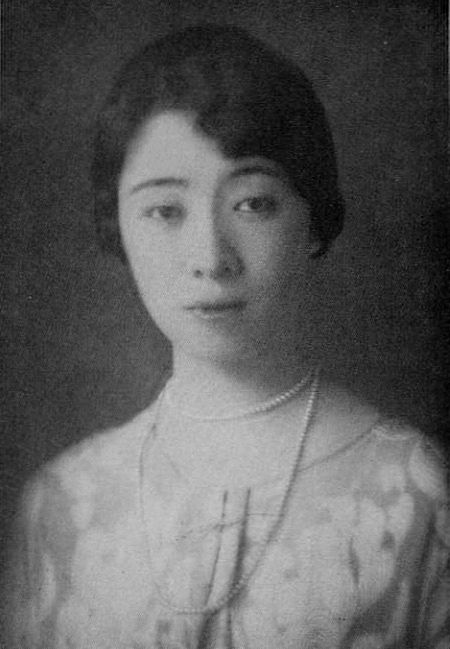
Princess Fushimi (Kuni) Tomoko, daughter

Military offices
Preceded by Yamaya Tanin	Naval War College; Headmaster; 18 August 1914 - 13 February 1915	Succeeded by Satō Tetsutarō
Preceded by Yamaya Tanin	2nd Fleet; Commander-in-chief; 1 December 1919 – 1 December 1920	Succeeded by Suzuki Kantarō
Preceded by Saitō Hanroku	Sasebo Naval District; Commander-in-chief; 5 February 1924 - 15 April 1925	Succeeded by Hyakutake Saburō
Preceded by Taniguchi Naomi	Navy General Staff; Chairman; 2 February 1932 – 9 April 1941	Succeeded by Nagano Osami
