= Hiroaki Fushimi =

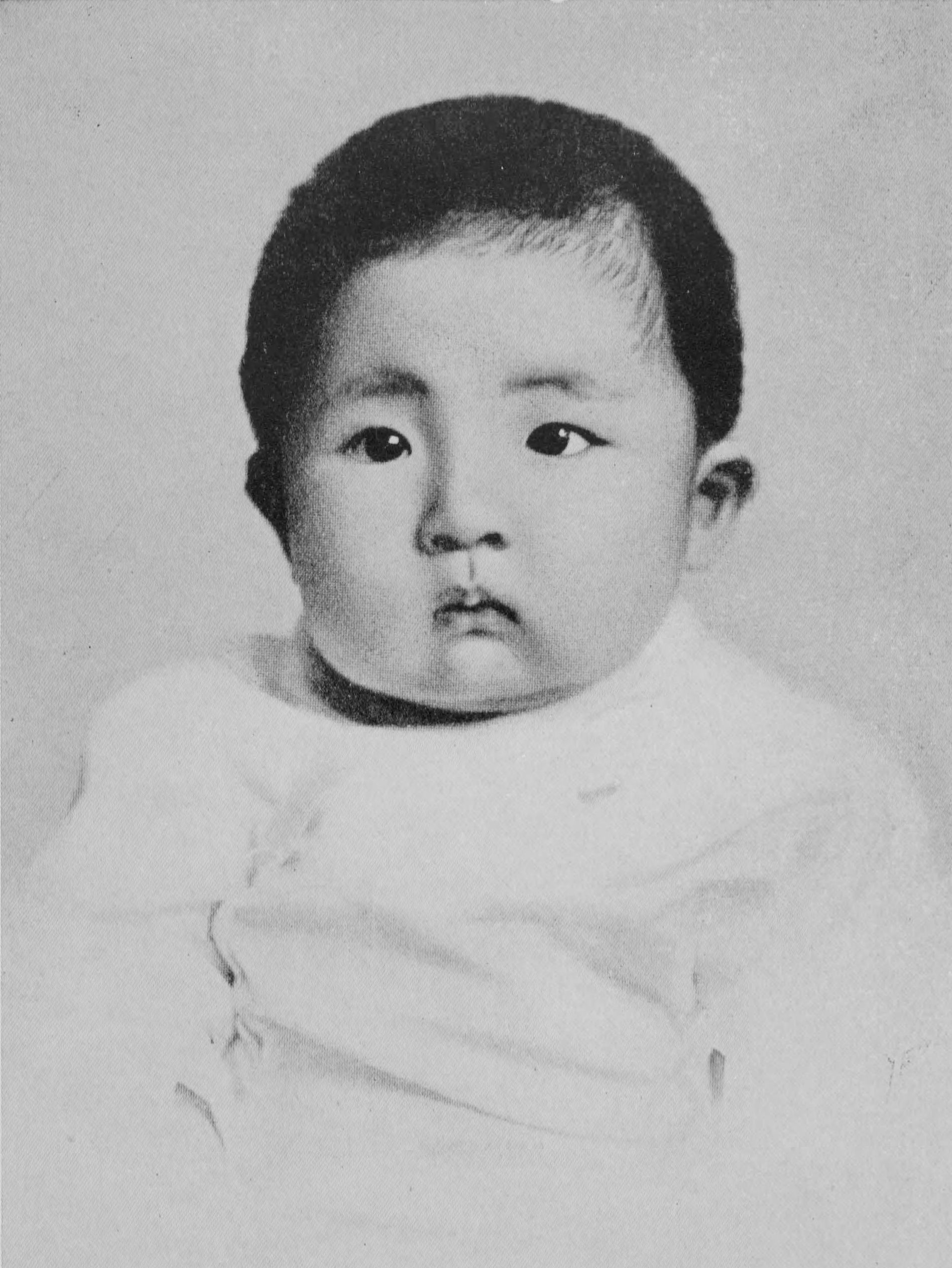
- Infancy (1930s)

Prince Fushimi
- Reign: 16 August 1946 – 14 October 1947
- Predecessor: Hiroyasu Fushimi

Head of Fushimi-no-miya
- Reign: 16 August 1946 – present
- Born: 26 January 1932 (age 94); Kōjimachi, Tokyo, Japan
- Spouse: Tokiko Yoshikawa
- Issue: Masako Fushimi; Nobuko Fushimi; Akiko Fushimi
- Father: Hiroyoshi Fushimi
- Mother: Tokiko Ichijō

Hiroaki Fushimi (伏見宮 博明王, Fushimi-no-miya Hiroaki-ō; born 26 January 1932) is a former Japanese prince, the only son of Prince Fushimi Hiroyoshi and 24th head of the Fushimi-no-miya shinnōke (one of the four branch houses of the Imperial Family of Japan). He became a commoner since the passing of the Imperial Household Law of 1947. If the law had not been changed, he would have been 4th in line to the Japanese throne as of 2019.

== Life ==
In terms of succession to the Japanese throne, Hiroaki Fushimi is a 16th cousin, thrice removed, of Emperor Naruhito. Their most recent common ancestor in the paternal line was Prince Fushimi Sadafusa (1372–1456), who fathered Naruhito's forefather Emperor Go-Hanazono (1428–1464) and Hiroaki's forefather Prince Fushimi Sadatsune (1426–1474). Despite the great distance, Hiroaki is the closest male-line relative to the current Imperial House, and has therefore figured in the Japanese succession debate as a possible successor to the throne in case all five male members of the Imperial House die without heirs. Hiroaki is also more immediately a third cousin once removed of the present Emperor, as both are descended from Prince Fushimi Kuniie, Naruhito's three-times great-grandfather through his grandmother the Empress Kojun, and Hiroaki's paternal great-great-grandfather.

He was born in Tokyo, and educated at the Gakushuin Peers School. His father, Prince Fushimi Hiroyoshi (1897–1938) was a naval commander in the Imperial Japanese Navy, and died shortly after the opening stages of the Second Sino-Japanese War in 1937. Prince Hiroaki, therefore, became the twenty-fourth head of the Fushimi-no-miya upon the death of grandfather, Prince Fushimi Hiroyasu, on 16 August 1946.

He was styled His Imperial Highness. With the abolition of the collateral branches of the Imperial household by the American occupation authorities after the end of the Pacific War, Prince Fushimi became a commoner, Hiroaki Fushimi on 14 October 1947. He later traveled to the United States and attended Centre College in Kentucky (where one of his classmates was the former crown prince of Korea, Prince Ku). He returned to Japan to pursue a career with Mobil Oil.

His late wife, the former Tokiko Yoshikawa, was the daughter of the president of Yoshikawa Optical Instruments. The couple have three daughters: Akiko (born 1959), Nobuko (born 1961), and Masako (born 1964).

== Sources ==
- Fujitani, T. Splendid Monarchy: Power and Pageantry in Modern Japan. University of California Press; Reprint edition (1998). ISBN 0-520-21371-8
- Lebra, Sugiyama Takie. Above the Clouds: Status Culture of the Modern Japanese Nobility. University of California Press (1995). ISBN 0-520-07602-8
