= Prince Kachō Hirotada =

Prince Kachō Hirotada 華頂宮博忠王
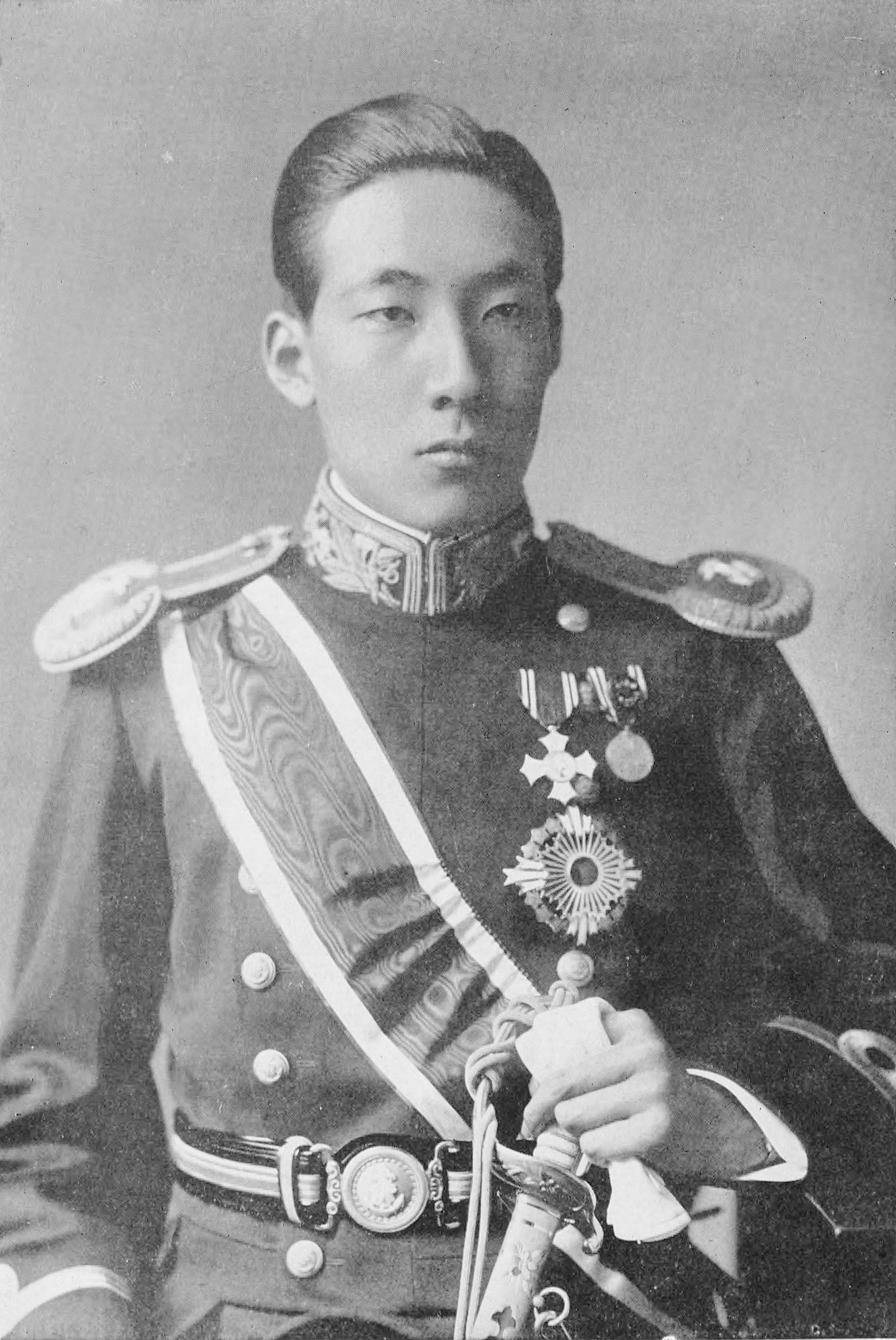
- Born: 26 January 1902; Tokyo, Japan
- Died: 24 March 1924 (aged 22); Sasebo, Nagasaki, Japan
- Father: Prince Fushimi Hiroyasu
- Mother: Tsuneko Tokugawa

Hirotada, Prince Kachō (華頂宮博忠王, Kachō-no-miya Hirotada-ō; 26 January 1902 – 24 March 1924) of Japan, was a member of a collateral branch of the Japanese imperial family.

== Biography ==
Prince Hirotada was the second son of Prince Fushimi Hiroyasu. His mother was Tokugawa Tsuneko, the 9th daughter of the last Tokugawa Shōgun, Tokugawa Yoshinobu. He succeeded his father to the head of the Kachō-no-miya household when he was only 2 years old in 1904.

Prince Kachō attended the Gakushuin Peers’ School. He entered the 49th class of the Imperial Japanese Naval Academy in 1918, graduating 1st out of 176 cadets. Prince Kuni Asaakira was one of his classmates. He served his midshipman duty on the cruiser Yakumo. In January 1922, he served for an obligatory session as a member of the House of Peers in the Diet of Japan, returning to the Imperial Japanese Navy in May of the same year as a second lieutenant. He was assigned to the battleship Mutsu. In 1923, he attended the naval artillery and torpedo schools. He then served on the cruiser Isuzu. In 1924, he was promoted to lieutenant and awarded the Grand Cordon of the Supreme Order of the Chrysanthemum. While serving on Isuzu, he fell ill and had to be hospitalized at the naval hospital at Sasebo, where he died.

Since Prince Kachō was issueless, on his death in 1924, the Kachō-no-miya line became extinct.

However, to preserve the Kachō-no-miya name and to ensure that the proper familial and ancestral rites were performed, his brother Prince Hironobu (the 3rd son of Prince Fushimi Hiroyasu) agreed to a reduction in status from the imperial household to the kazoku peerage, and was renamed Marquis Kachō Hironobu.

Preceded by Prince Fushimi Hiroyasu	4th Kwacho-no-miya; 1904-1924	Succeeded by Marquis Kwacho Hironobu
