= Prince Fushimi Hiroyoshi =

Prince Fushimi Hiroyoshi 伏見宮博義王
- Hereditary Prince Fushimi
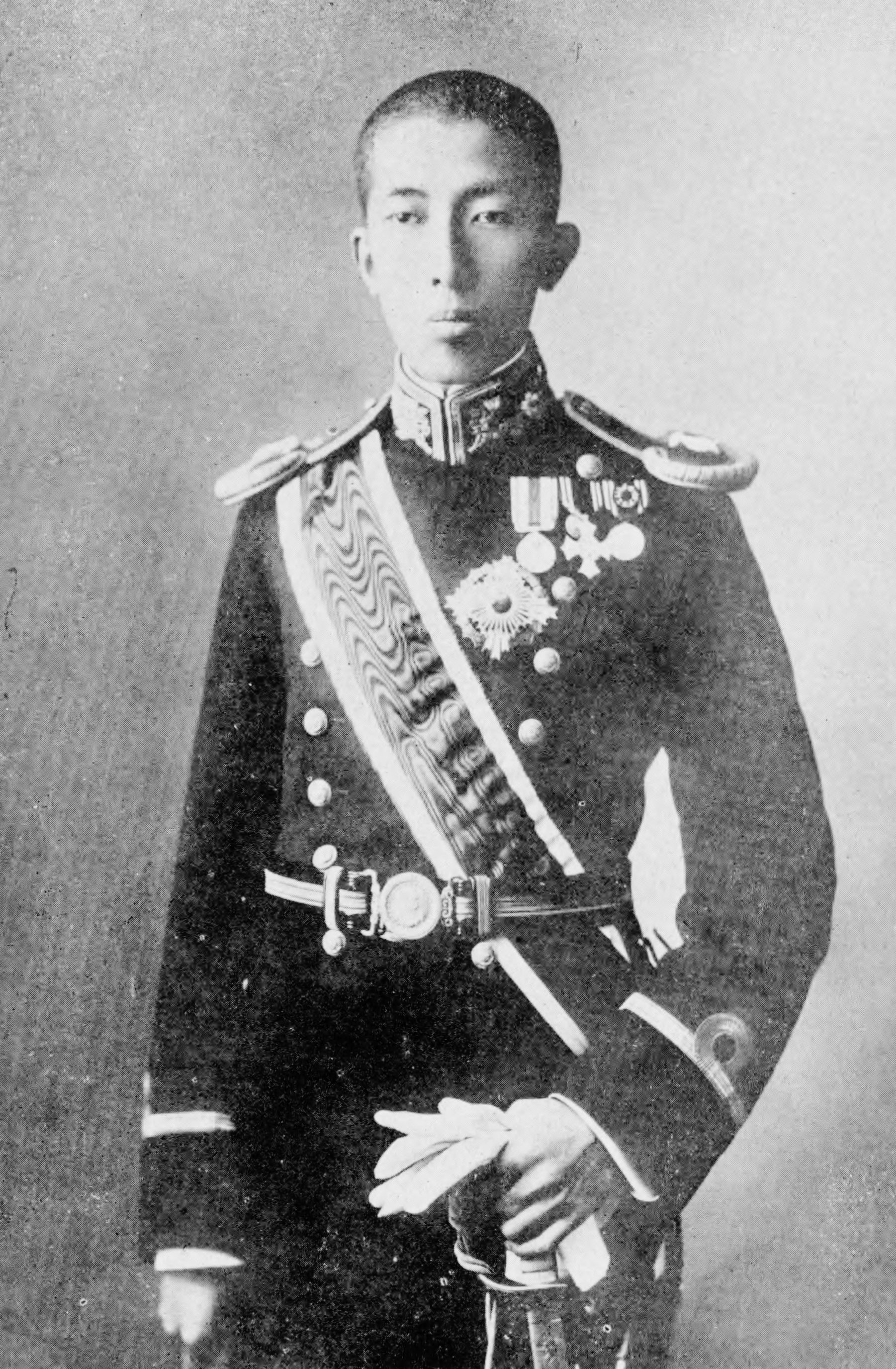
- Born: 8 December 1897; Tokyo, Japan
- Died: 19 October 1938 (aged 40); Tokyo, Japan
- Spouse: Tokiko Ichijō
- Issue: Mitsuko Fushimi; Hiroaki Fushimi; Yoshiko Fushimi; Ayako Fushimi
- Father: Prince Fushimi Hiroyasu
- Mother: Tsuneko Tokugawa
- Military career
- Allegiance: Empire of Japan
- Branch: Imperial Japanese Navy
- Service years: 1917–1938
- Rank: Captain (posthumous)
- Commands: 6th Destroyer Group; 3rd Destroyer Group; Amagiri; Kamikaze; Yomogi; Kaba
- Conflicts: Second Sino-Japanese War; Battle of Shanghai
- Awards: Grand Cordon of the Order of the Paulownia Flowers

Prince Fushimi Hiroyoshi (伏見宮博義王, Fushimi-no-miya Hiroyoshi-ō; 8 December 1897 – 19 October 1938) was the eldest son of Prince Fushimi Hiroyasu, and heir-apparent due to inherit the position of 24th head of the Fushimi-no-miya shinnōke (collateral branch of the Imperial Family of Japan), and a career officer in the Imperial Japanese Navy.

== Early life ==
Prince Fushimi Hiroyoshi was the eldest son and heir of Admiral of the Fleet Prince Fushimi Hiroyasu and his wife, the former Tokugawa Tsuneko. He graduated from the 45th class of the Imperial Japanese Naval Academy in 1917, ranked first in a class of 89 cadets. His classmates included Kosaku Ariga, final captain of the battleship Yamato.

== Military career ==
Prince Fushimi served his midshipman tour on the cruiser Iwate, and as a sub-lieutenant on the battleships Fusō and Kawachi. After completing coursework in naval artillery and torpedo warfare, he served as a crewman on Kongō, Hyūga, Kirishima and Hiei. After completing advanced training in torpedo warfare, he was assigned as Chief Torpedo officer on the destroyers Shimakaze, Numakaze, and cruisers Izumo and Naka. On 10 December 1928, he received his first command, the destroyer Kaba. He was subsequently captain of the destroyers Yomogi, Kamikaze, and Amagiri.

In 1933, the Prince was promoted to commander and became executive officer on the cruiser Naka, followed by the minelayer Itsukushima.

In 1936, Prince Fushimi became commander of the 3rd Destroyer Group, which was involved in combat in the Battle of Shanghai between Japanese and Chinese Nationalist forces during the opening stages of the Second Sino-Japanese War. On 25 September 1937, he was slightly injured in the Huangpu River during a bombardment operation. After recovery, he served as commander of the 6th Destroyer Group, assigned to patrols in the Yangtze River of China.

In April 1938, he was assigned back to Japan, where he became the instructor of a Naval War College.

On 19 October 1938, Prince Fushimi, who suffered from chronic asthma, died of myocardial infarction. It is said that the cause of his death was an unsuitable medicine which was injected by his doctor. His military rank was posthumously raised to captain.

== Marriage and family ==
On 23 December 1919, Prince Fushimi married Tokiko Ichijō (一条朝子; 20 June 1903 – 3 April 1971), the third daughter of Prince Saneteru Ichijō, by whom he had four children:

1. Princess Fushimi Mitsuko (光子女王, Mitsuko Joō; 28 July 1929 – 3 June 1987)
2. Prince Fushimi Hiroaki (伏見宮博明王, Fushimi Hiroaki-ō; born 26 January 1932)
3. Princess Fushimi Yoshiko (令子女王, Yoshiko Joō; 14 February 1933 – 25 October 1937)
4. Princess Fushimi Ayako (章子女王, Ayako Joō; born 11 February 1934)

== Gallery ==
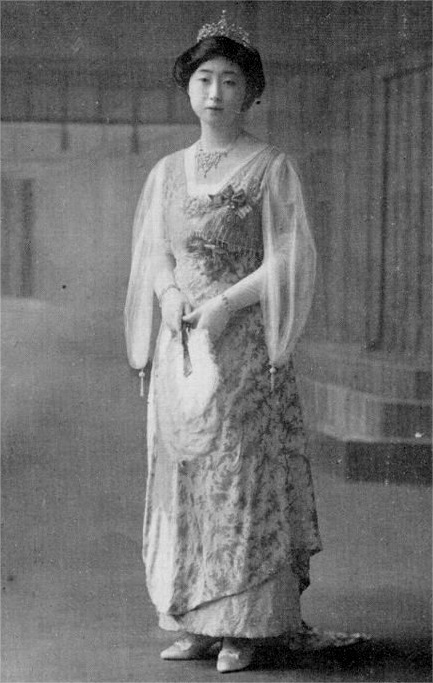
HIH Princess Fushimi Tokiko, consort

== Ancestry ==
Ancestors of Prince Fushimi Hiroyoshi

16. Prince Fushimi Sadayoshi (1776-1841)
8. Prince Fushimi Kuniie (1802-1872)
4. Prince Fushimi Sadanaru (1858-1923)
18. Takatsukasa Masahiro (1761-1841)
9. Keiko Takatsukasa (1814-1892)
2. Prince Fushimi Hiroyasu (1875-1946)
20. Prince Arisugawa Tsunahito (1785-1845)
10. Prince Arisugawa Takahito (1812-1886)
21. Toshima Katsuko
5. Princess Arisugawa Toshiko (1858-1927)
11. Mori Noriko
1. Prince Fushimi Hiroyoshi
24. Tokugawa Harutoshi, 7th Lord of Mito (1773-1816)
12. Tokugawa Nariaki, 9th Lord of Mito (1800-1860)
25. Toyama
6. Prince Tokugawa Yoshinobu, 15th Tokugawa Shōgun (1837-1913)
26. Prince Arisugawa Orihito (1754-1820)
13. Princess Arisugawa Yoshiko (1804-1893)
3. Lady Tokugawa Tsuneko (1882-1939)
14. Matsudaira Kanjūrō
7. Shinmura Nobu (1852-1905)
