= Japanese architecture =

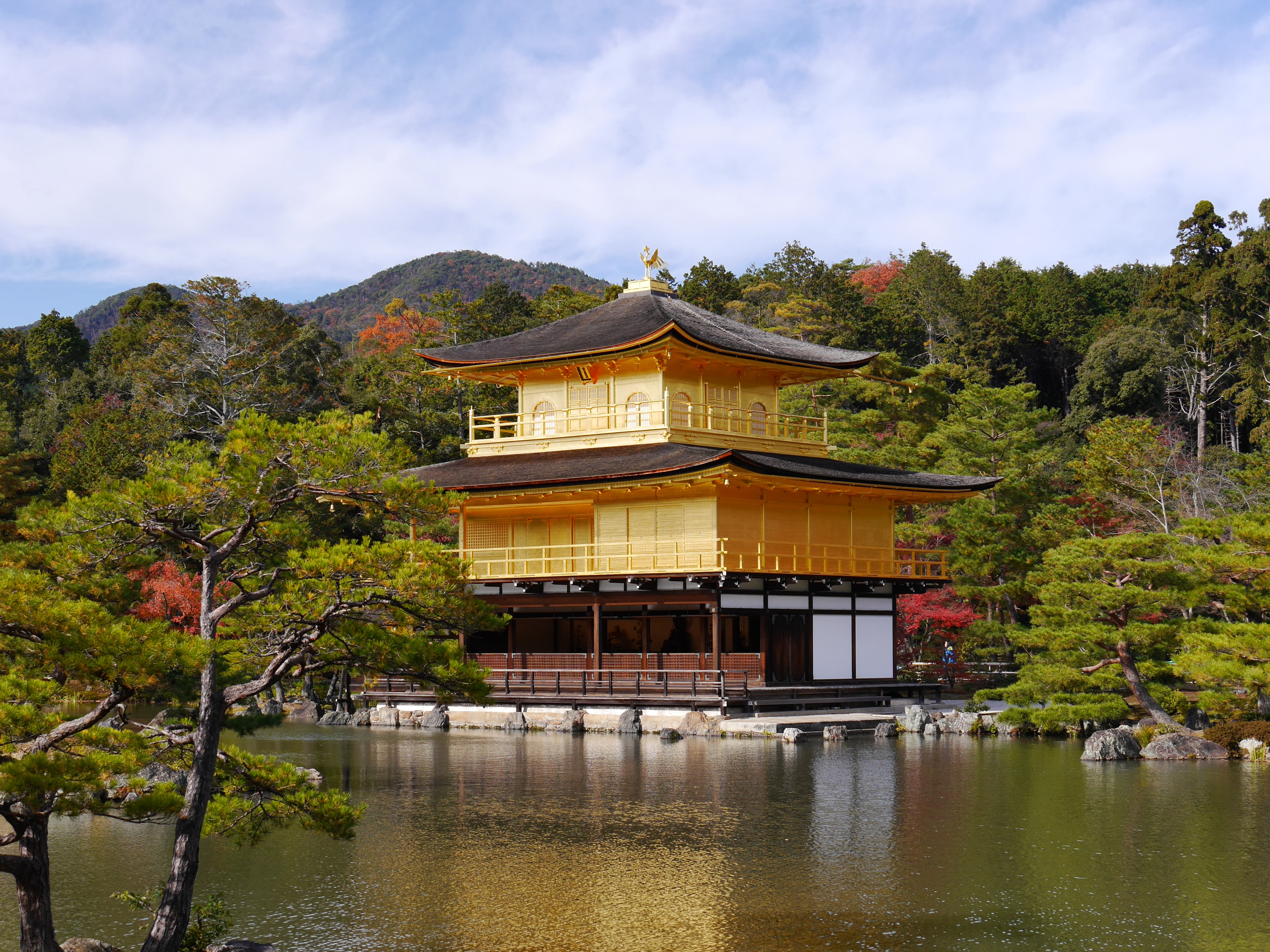
Kinkaku-ji, Kyoto, originally built in 1397 (Muromachi period)

Japanese architecture (日本建築, Nihon kenchiku) has been typified by wooden structures, elevated slightly off the ground, with tiled or thatched roofs. Sliding doors (fusuma) and other traditional partitions were used in place of walls, allowing the internal configuration of a space to be customized for different occasions. People usually sat on cushions or otherwise on the floor, traditionally; chairs and high tables were not widely used until the 20th century. Since the 19th century, however, Japan has incorporated much of Western, modern, and post-modern architecture into construction and design, and is today a leader in cutting-edge architectural design and technology.

The earliest Japanese architecture was seen in prehistoric times in simple pit-houses and stores adapted to the needs of a hunter-gatherer population. Influence from Han dynasty China via Korea saw the introduction of more complex grain stores and ceremonial burial chambers.

The introduction of Buddhism in Japan during the sixth century was a catalyst for large-scale temple building using complicated techniques in wood. Influence from the Chinese Sui and Tang dynasties led to the foundation of the first permanent capital in Nara. Its checkerboard street layout used the Chinese capital of Chang'an as a template for its design.

In 894 during the Heian period (794–1185), Japan abolished kentōshi (Japanese missions to Tang China) and began to distance itself from Chinese culture, and a culture called Kokufu bunka (lit., Japanese culture) which was suited to the Japanese climate and aesthetic sense flourished. The shinden-zukuri style, which was the architectural style of the residences of nobles in this period, showed the distinct uniqueness of Japanese architecture and permanently determined the characteristics of later Japanese architecture. Its features are an open structure with few walls that can be opened and closed with doors, shitomi and sudare, a structure in which shoes are taken off to enter the house on stilts, and sitting or sleeping directly on tatami mats without using chairs and beds.

As the samurai class gained power in the Kamakura period (1185–1333), the shinden-zukuri style changed, and in the Muromachi period (1333–1573), the shoin-zukuri style appeared. This style had a lasting influence on later Japanese architectural styles and became the basis of modern Japanese houses. Its characteristics were that sliding doors called fusuma and paper windows called shōji were fully adopted, and tatami mats were laid all over the room.

The introduction of the tea ceremony emphasised simplicity and modest design as a counterpoint to the excesses of the aristocracy. In the Azuchi–Momoyama period (1568–1600), sukiya-zukuri style villas appeared under the influence of a tea house called chashitsu. At first it was an architectural style for the villas of daimyo (Japanese feudal lords) and court nobles, but in the Edo period (1683–1807) it was applied to ryōtei (Japanese-style restaurants) and chashitsu, and later it was also applied to residences.

During the Meiji Restoration of 1869 the history of Japanese architecture was radically changed by two important events. The first was the Kami and Buddhas Separation Act of 1868, which formally separated Buddhism from Shinto and Buddhist temples from Shinto shrines, breaking an association between the two which had lasted well over a thousand years. Secondly, it was then that Japan underwent a period of intense Westernization in order to compete with other developed countries. Initially, architects and styles from abroad were imported to Japan, but gradually the country taught its own architects and began to express its own style. Architects returning from study with Western architects introduced the International Style of modernism into Japan. However, it was not until after the Second World War that Japanese architects made an impression on the international scene, firstly with the work of architects like Kenzo Tange and then with theoretical movements, like Metabolism.

== General features of Japanese traditional architecture ==
In traditional Japanese architecture, there are various styles, features and techniques unique to Japan in each period and use, such as residence, castle, Buddhist temple and Shinto shrine. On the other hand, especially in ancient times, it was strongly influenced by Chinese culture like other Asian countries, so it has characteristics common to architecture in Asian countries.

Partly due, also, to the variety of climates in Japan, and the millennium encompassed between the first cultural import and the last, the result is extremely heterogeneous, but several practically universal features can nonetheless be found. First of all is the choice of materials, always wood in various forms (planks, straw, tree bark, paper, etc.) for almost all structures. Unlike both Western and some Chinese architecture, the use of stone is avoided except for certain specific uses, for example temple podia and pagoda foundations.

The general structure is almost always the same: posts and lintels support a large and gently curved roof, while the walls are paper-thin, often movable and never load-bearing. Arches and barrel roofs are completely absent. Gable and eave curves are gentler than in China and columnar entasis (convexity at the center) limited.

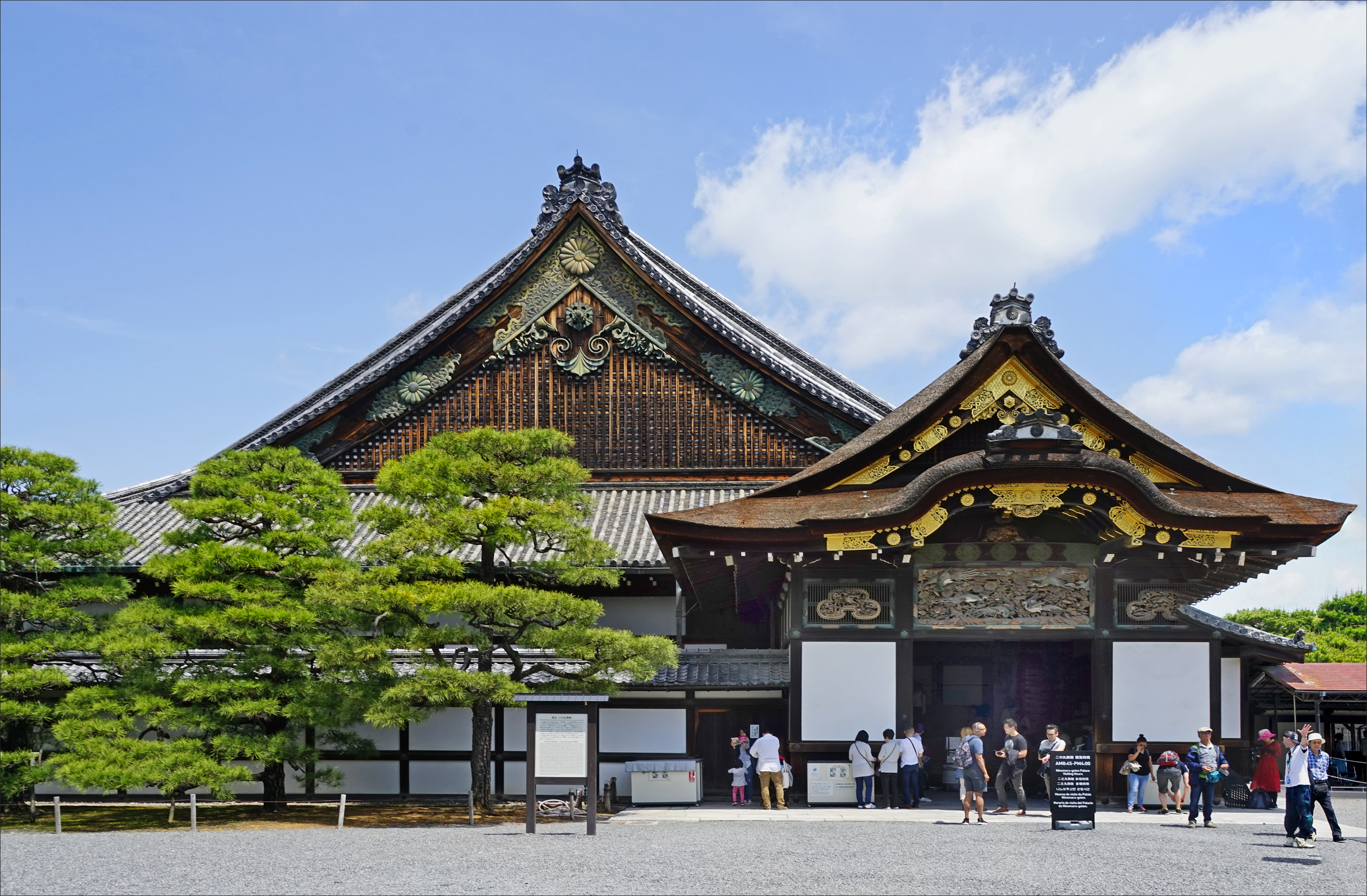
The roof is the dominant feature of traditional Japanese architecture.

The roof is the most visually impressive component, often constituting half the size of the whole edifice. The slightly curved eaves extend far beyond the walls, covering verandas, and their weight must therefore be supported by complex bracket systems called tokyō, in the case of temples and shrines. Simpler solutions are adopted in domestic structures. The oversize eaves give the interior a characteristic dimness, which contributes to the building's atmosphere. The interior of the building normally consists of a single room at the center called moya, from which depart any other less important spaces.

Inner space divisions are fluid, and room size can be modified through the use of screens or movable paper walls. The large, single space offered by the main hall can therefore be divided according to the need. For example, some walls can be removed and different rooms joined temporarily to make space for some more guests. The separation between inside and outside is itself in some measure not absolute as entire walls can be removed, opening a residence or temple to visitors. Verandas appear to be part of the building to an outsider, but part of the external world to those in the building. Structures are therefore made to a certain extent part of their environment. Care is taken to blend the edifice into the surrounding natural environment.

The use of construction modules keeps proportions between different parts of the edifice constant, preserving its overall harmony. (On the subject of building proportions, see also the article ken).

Even in cases as that of Nikkō Tōshō-gū, where every available space is heavily decorated, ornamentation tends to follow, and therefore emphasize, rather than hide, basic structures.

Being shared by both sacred and profane architecture, these features made it easy converting a lay building into a temple or vice versa. This happened for example at Hōryū-ji, where a noblewoman's mansion was transformed into a religious building.

== Prehistoric period ==
The prehistoric period includes the Jōmon, Yayoi and Kofun periods stretching from approximately 5000 BCE to the beginning of the eighth century CE.

During the three phases of the Jōmon period the population was primarily hunter-gatherer with some primitive agriculture skills and their behaviour was predominantly determined by changes in climatic conditions and other natural stimulants. Early dwellings were pit houses consisting of shallow pits with tamped earth floors and grass roofs designed to collect rainwater with the aid of storage jars. Later in the period, a colder climate with greater rainfall led to a decline in population, which contributed to an interest in ritual. Concentric stone circles first appeared during this time.

During the Yayoi period, the Japanese people began to interact with the Chinese Han dynasty, whose knowledge and technical skills began to influence them. The Japanese began to build raised-floor storehouses as granaries, which were constructed using metal tools like saws and chisels that began to appear at this time. A reconstruction in Toro, Shizuoka is a wooden box made of thick boards joined in the corners in a log cabin style and supported on eight pillars. The roof is thatched but, unlike the typically hipped roof of the pit dwellings, it is a simple V-shaped gable. Some authors credit the raised structure designs of this period to contact with the rice-cultivating Austronesian peoples from coastal eastern China or Taiwan, rather than the Han.

The Kofun period marked the appearance of many-chambered burial mounds or tumuli (kofun literally means "old mounds"). Similar mounds in Korean Peninsula are thought to have been influenced by Japan. Early in the period, the tombs, known as "keyhole kofun" or zenpō-kōen-fun (前方後円墳), often made use of the existing topography, shaping it and adding man-made moats to form a distinctive keyhole shape, i.e. that of a circle interconnected with a triangle. Access was via a vertical shaft that was sealed off once the burial was completed. There was room inside the chamber for a coffin and grave goods. The mounds were often decorated with terracotta figures called haniwa. Later in the period mounds began to be located on flat ground and their scale greatly increased. Among many examples in Nara and Osaka, the most notable is the Daisen-kofun, designated as the tomb of Emperor Nintoku. The tomb covers 32 hectares (79 acres) and it is thought to have been decorated with 20,000 haniwa figures.

Towards the end of the Kofun period, tomb burials faded out as Buddhist cremation ceremonies gained popularity.

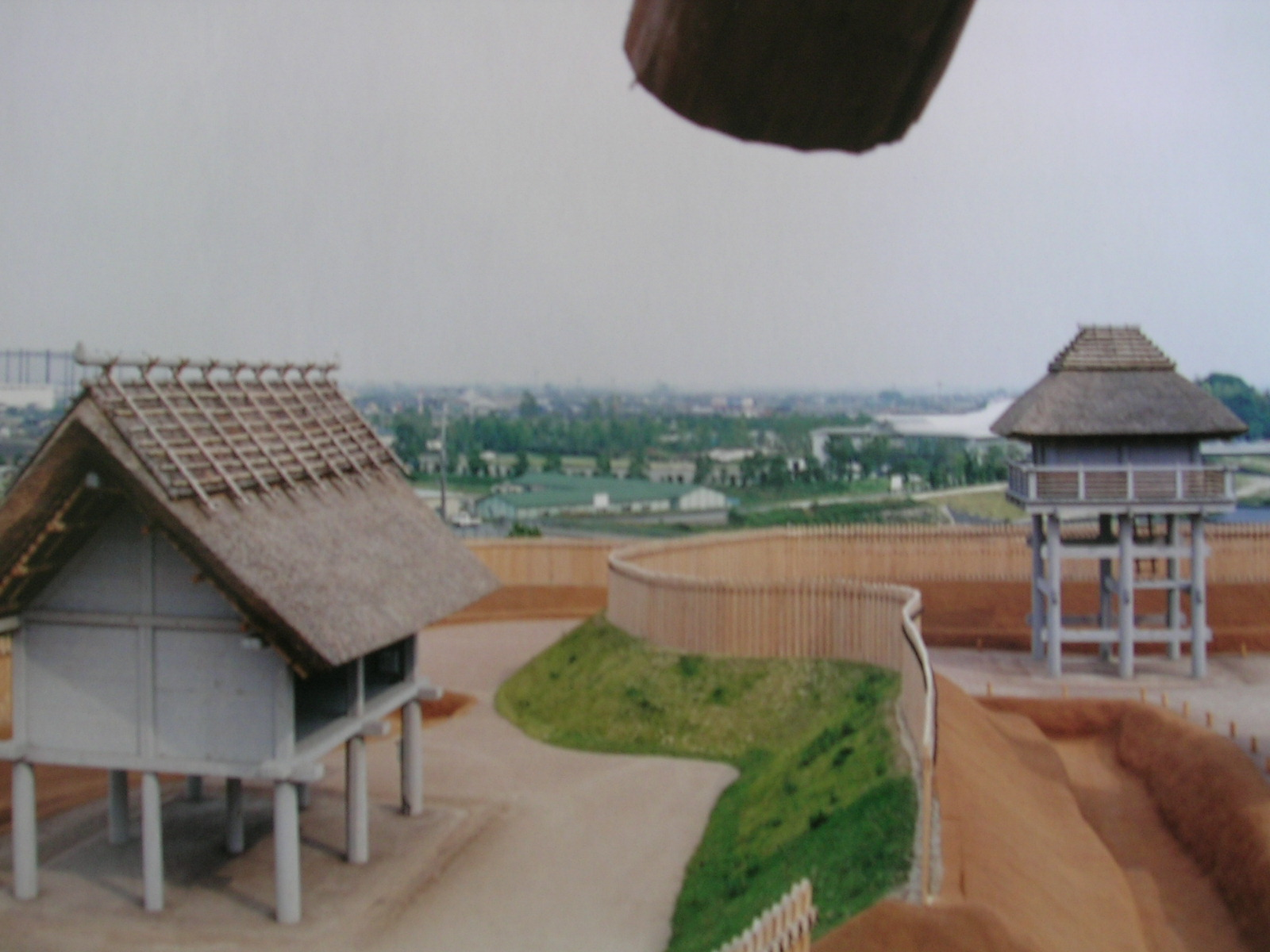
Reconstructed raised-floor building in Yoshinogari, Saga Prefecture, 2nd or 3rd century

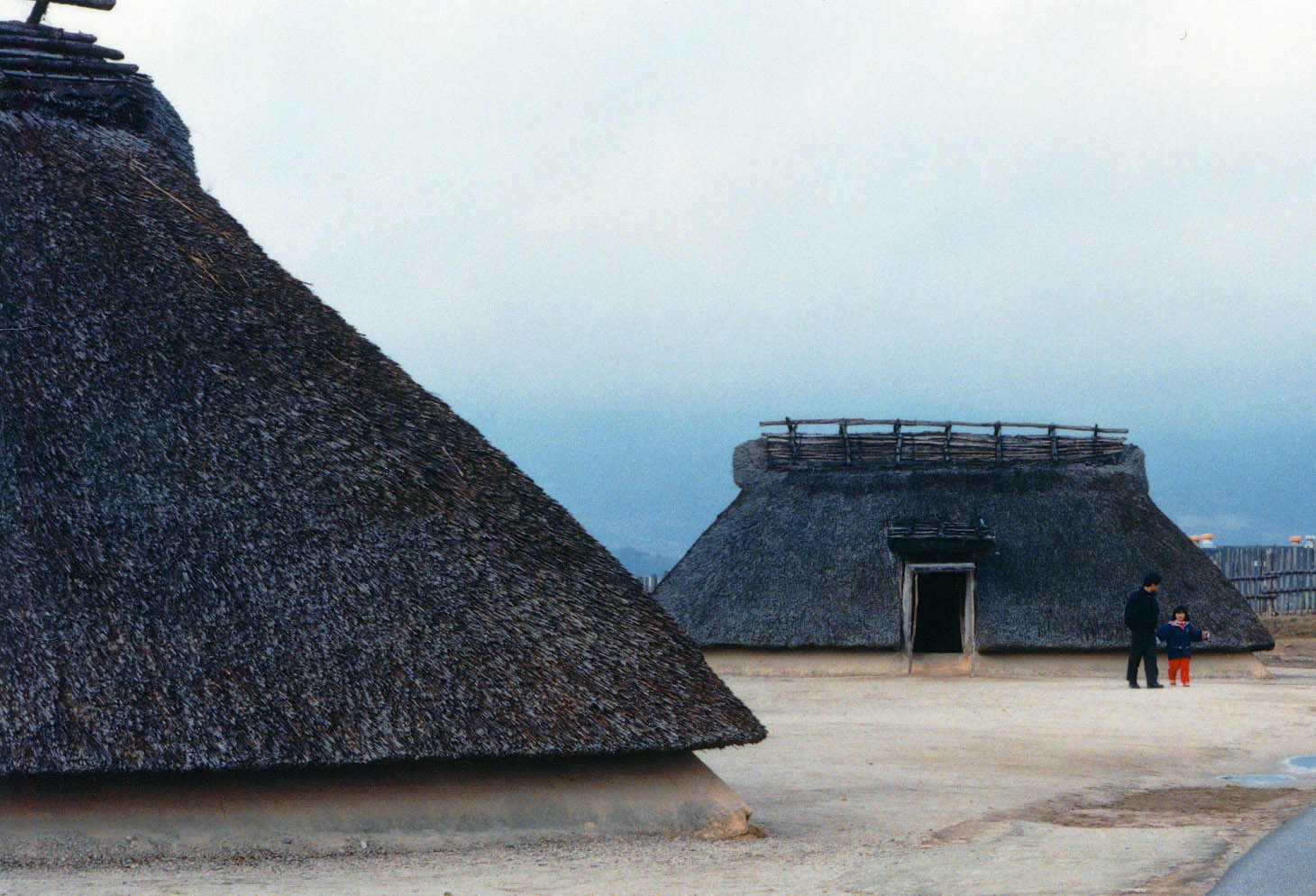
Reconstructed pit dwelling houses in Yoshinogari

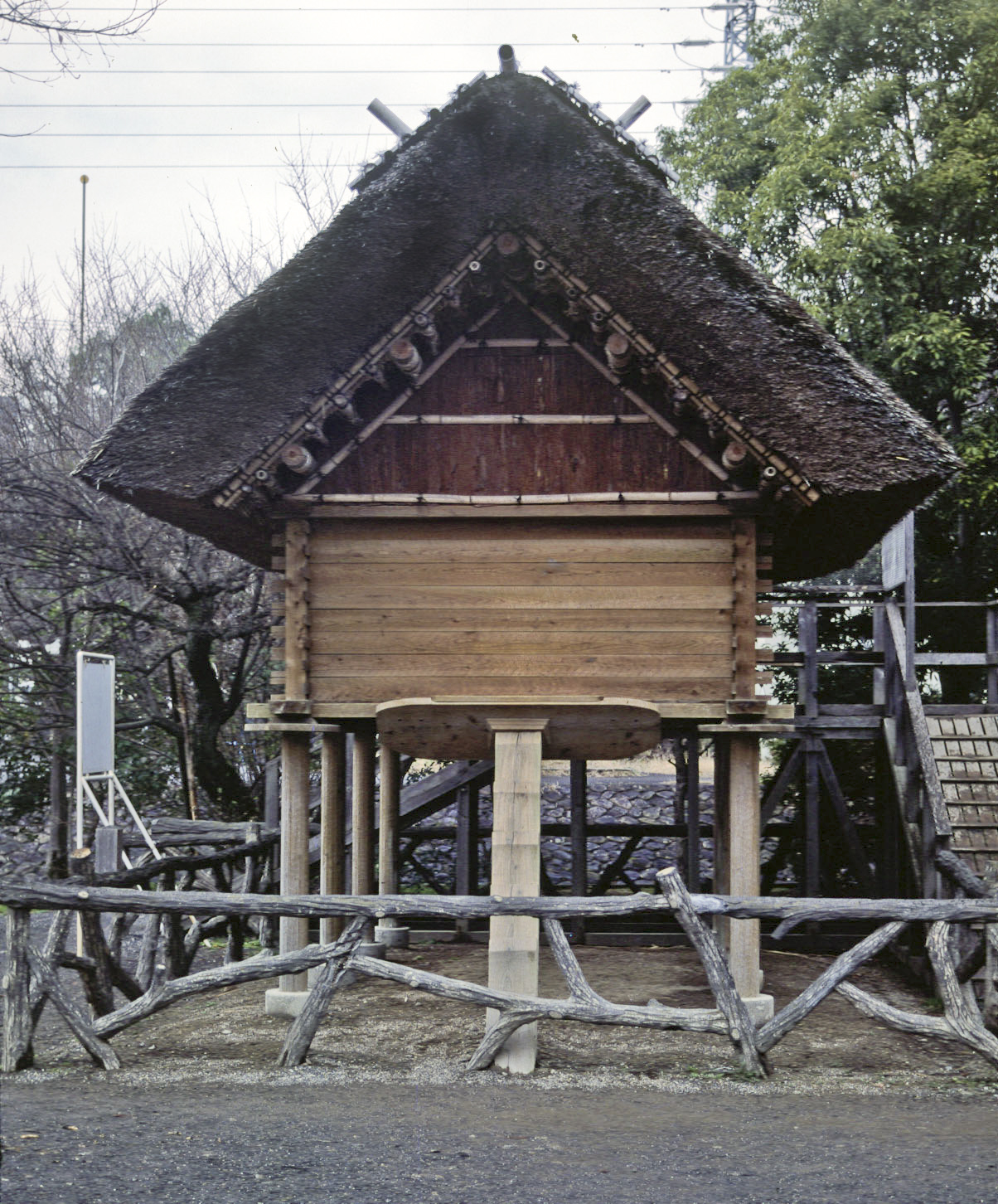
Reconstructed grain storehouse in Toro, Shizuoka

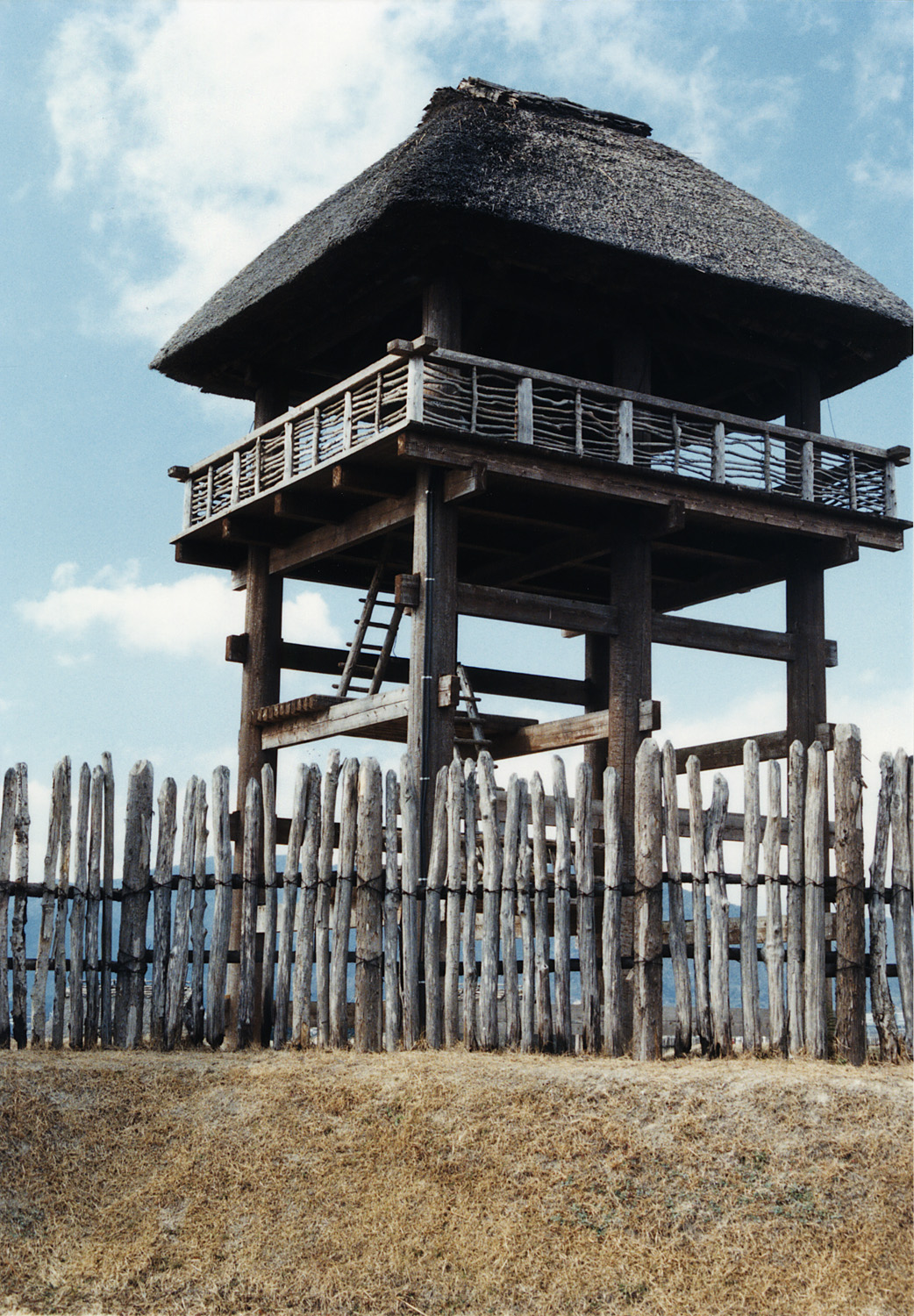
Reconstructed raised-floor building in Yoshinogari

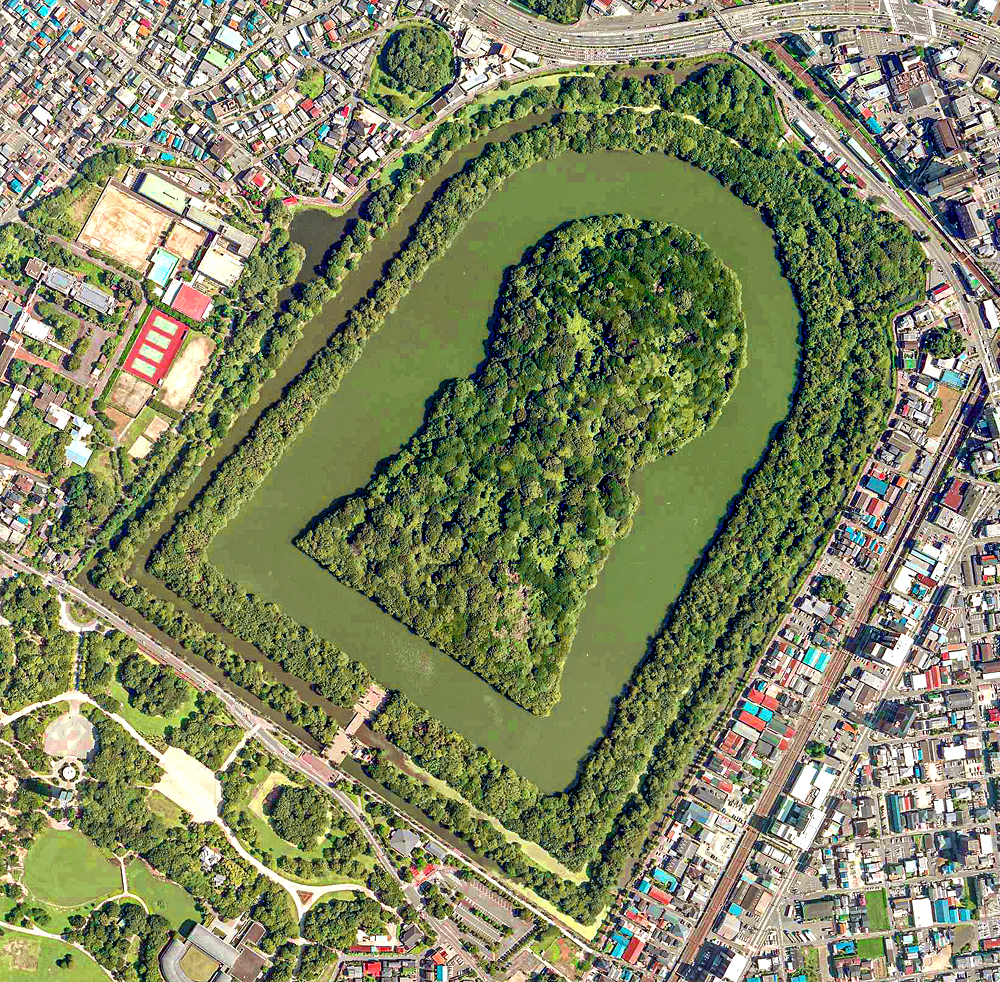
Daisenryō Kofun, Osaka, 5th century

== Asuka and Nara architecture ==
The most significant contributor to architectural changes during the Asuka period was the introduction of Buddhism. New temples became centers of worship with tomb burial practices quickly becoming outlawed. Also, Buddhism brought with it the idea of permanent shrines and gave to Shinto architecture much of its present vocabulary.

Some of the earliest structures still extant in Japan are Buddhist temples established at this time. The oldest surviving wooden buildings in the world are found at Hōryū-ji, northeast of Nara. First built in the early 7th century as the private temple of Crown Prince Shōtoku, it consists of 41 independent buildings; the most important ones, the main worship hall, or Kon-dō (金堂, Golden Hall), and the five-story pagoda), stand in the centre of an open area surrounded by a roofed cloister (kairō). The Kon-dō, in the style of Chinese worship halls, is a two-story structure of post-and-beam construction, capped by an irimoya, or hipped-gabled, roof of ceramic tiles.

Heijō-kyō, modern day Nara, was founded in 708 as the first permanent capital of the state of Japan. The layout of its checkerboard streets and buildings were modeled after the Chinese capital of Chang'an. The city soon became an important centre of Buddhist worship in Japan. The most grandiose of these temples was Tōdai-ji, built to rival temples of the Chinese Tang and Sui dynasties. Appropriately, the 16.2-m (53-ft) Buddha or Daibutsu (completed in 752) enshrined in the main hall is a Rushana Buddha, the figure that represents the essence of Buddhahood, just as Tōdai-ji represented the centre for imperially sponsored Buddhism and its dissemination throughout Japan. Only a few fragments of the original statue survive, and the present hall and central Buddha are reconstructions from the Edo period. Clustered around the main hall (the Daibutsuden) on a gently sloping hillside are a number of secondary halls: the Hokke-dō (Lotus Sutra Hall), and the storehouse, called the Shōsō-in, and the adjoining Kōfuku-ji. This last structure is of great importance as an art-historical cache, because in it are stored the utensils that were used in the temple's dedication ceremony in 752, as well as government documents and many secular objects owned by the imperial family.

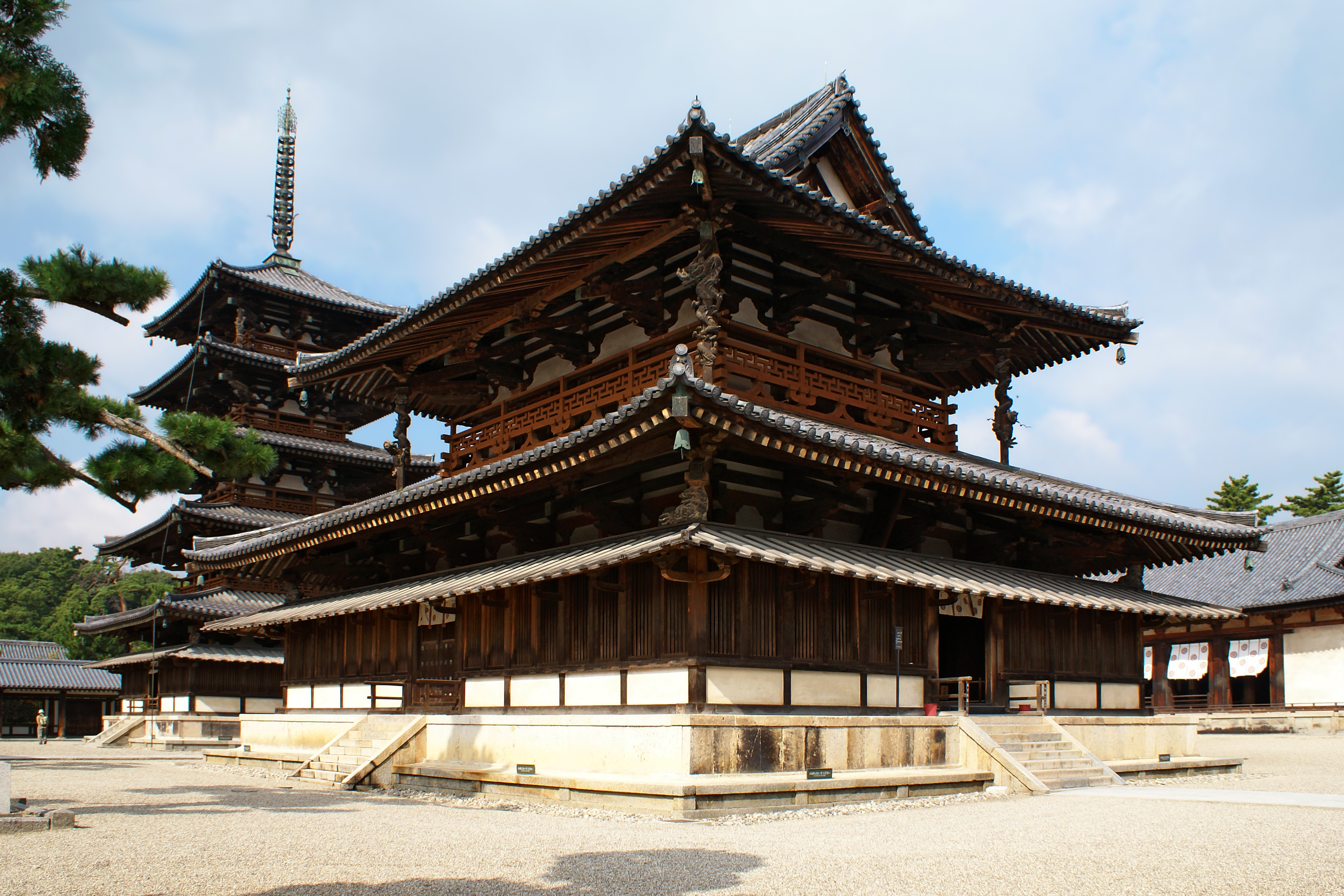
Kon-dō and pagoda at Hōryū-ji, Ikaruga, Nara
Built in 7th century

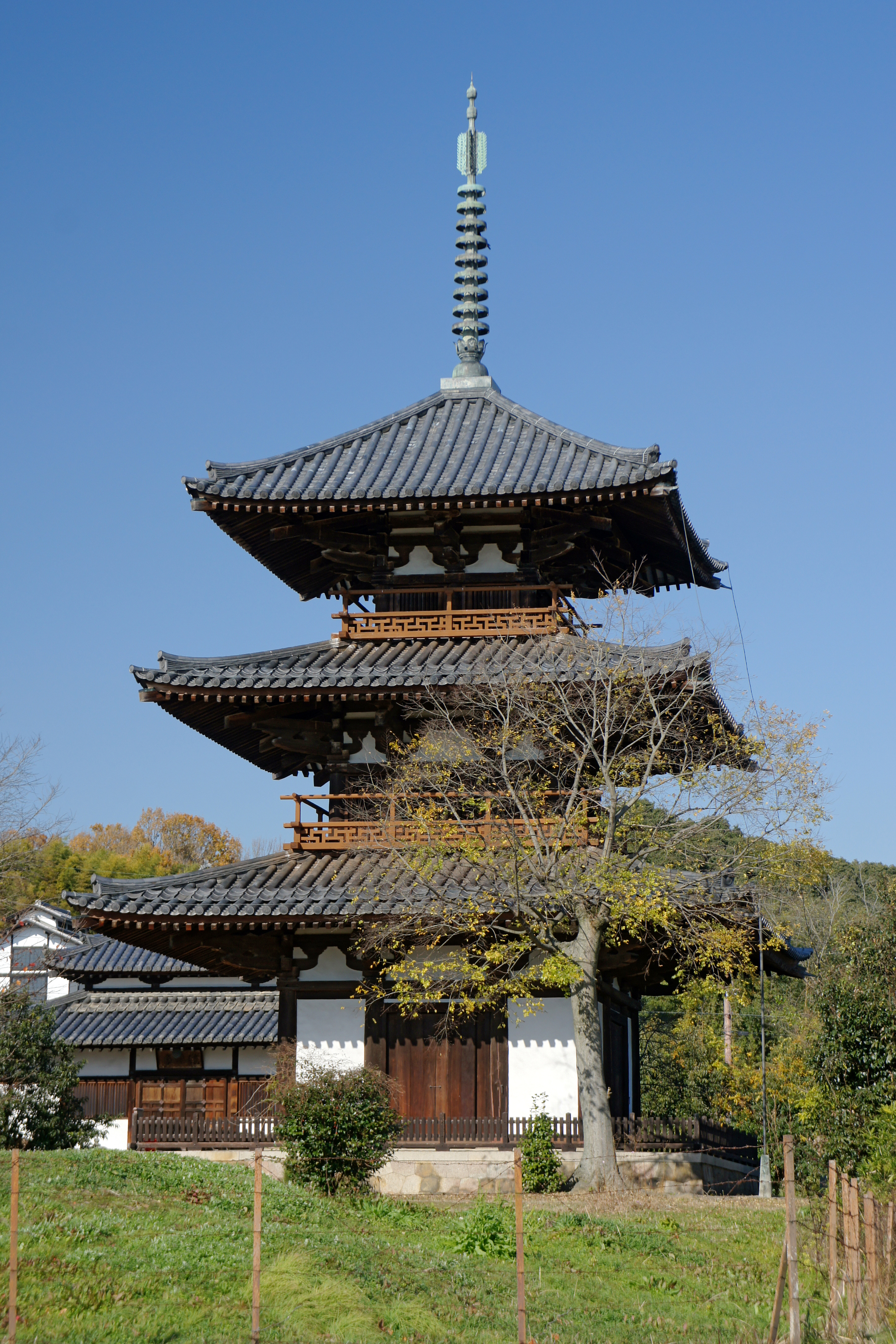
Pagoda at Hokki-ji, Ikaruga, Nara
Built in 706

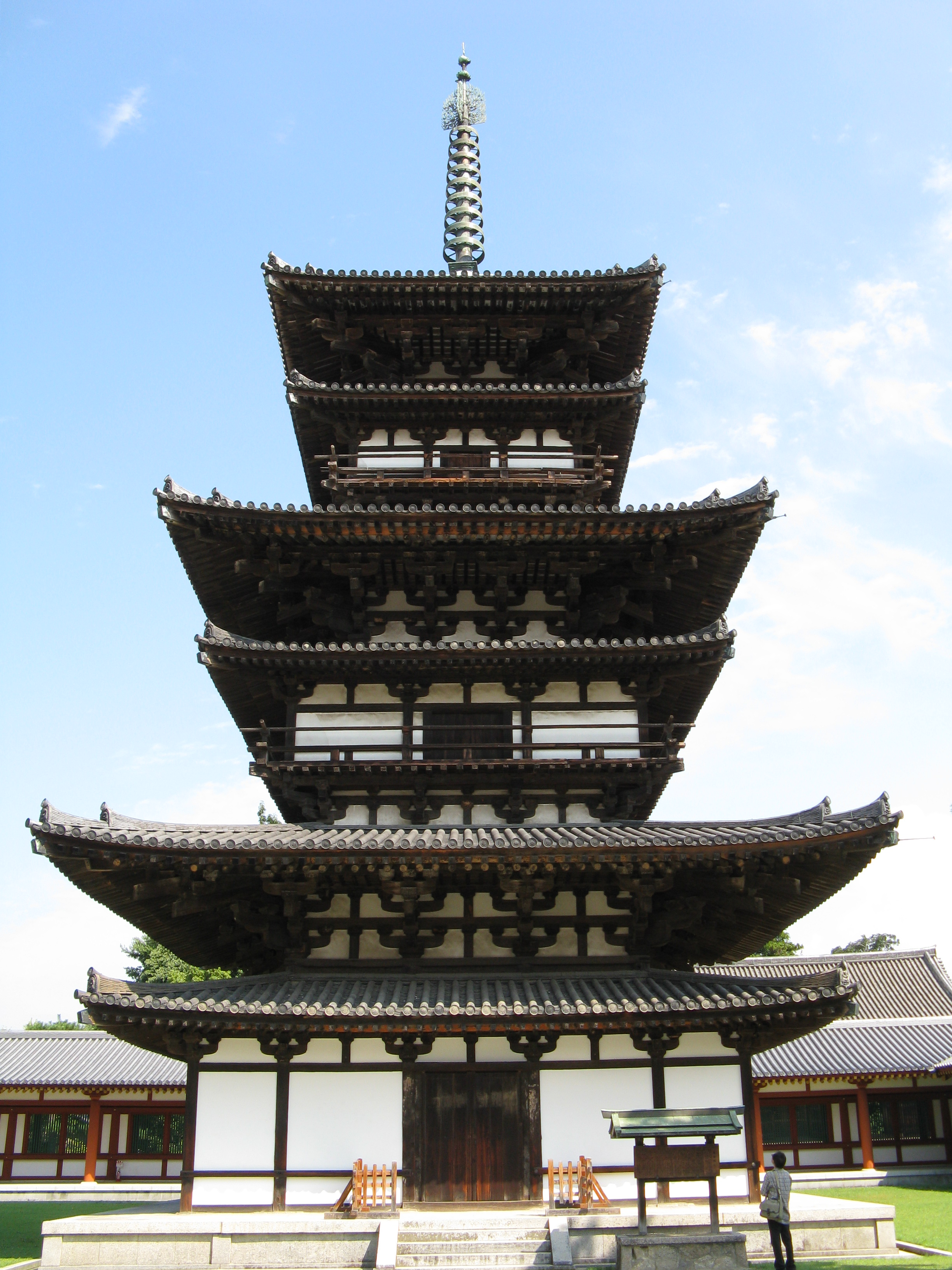
Pagoda at Yakushi-ji, Nara, Nara
Originally built in 730

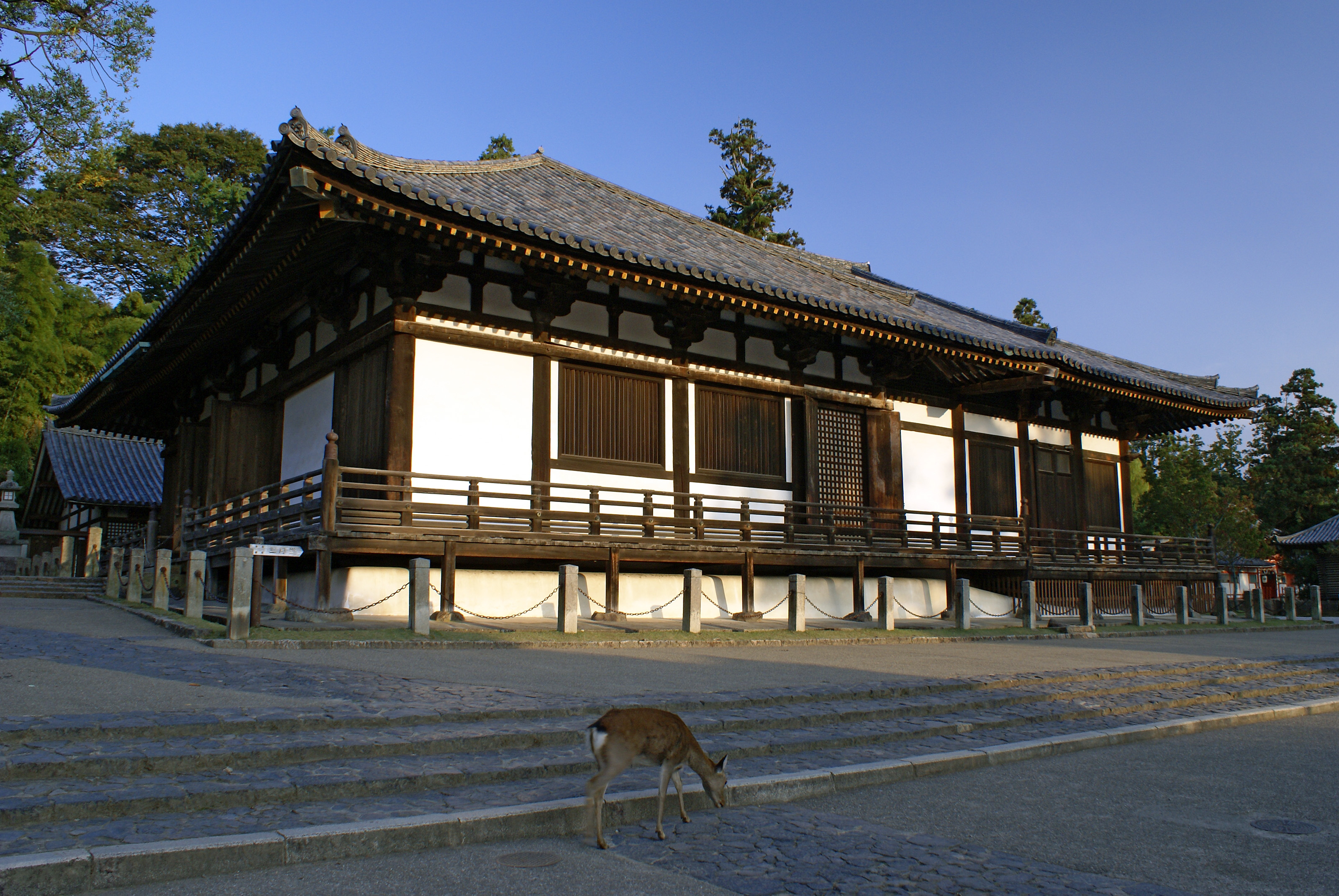
Hokkedō at Tōdai-ji, Nara, Nara
Founded in 743

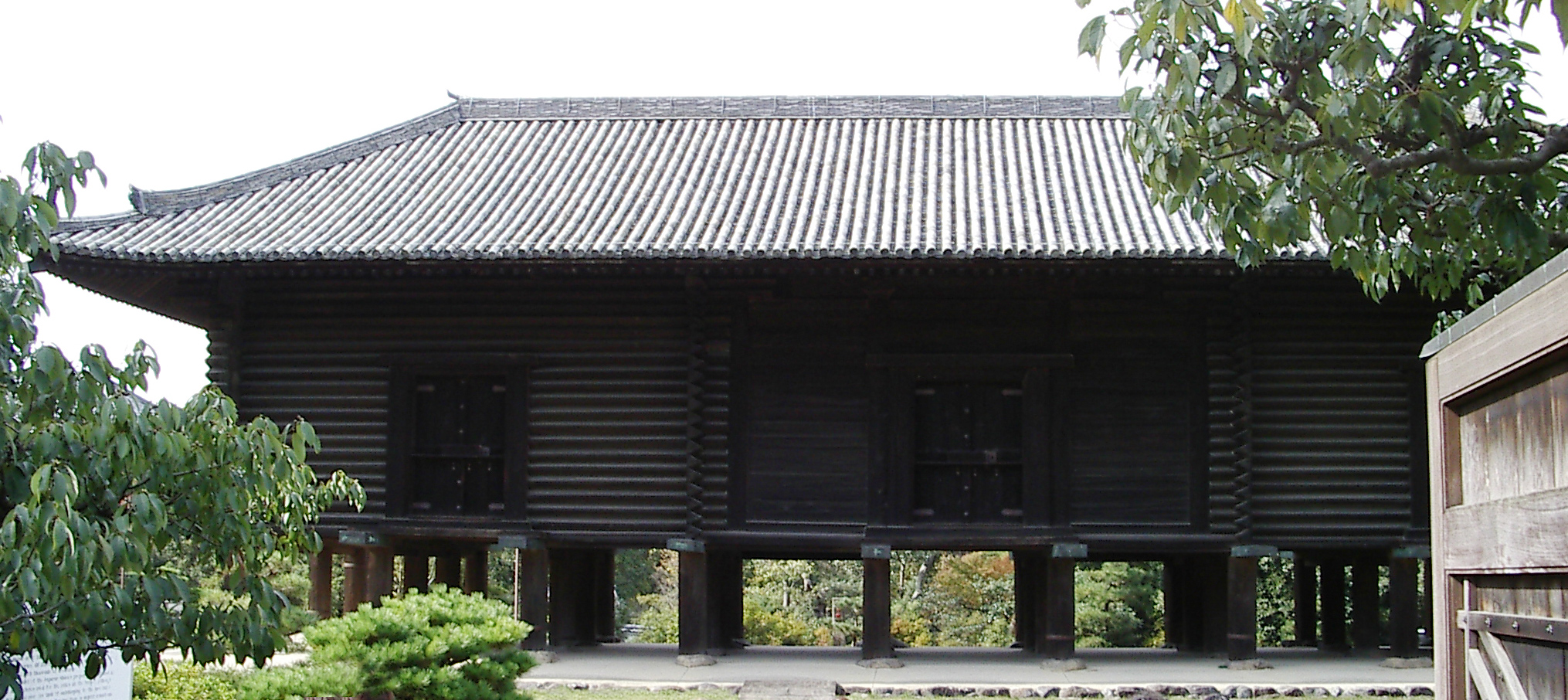
Shōsō-in at Tōdai-ji, Nara, Nara
Built in 8th century

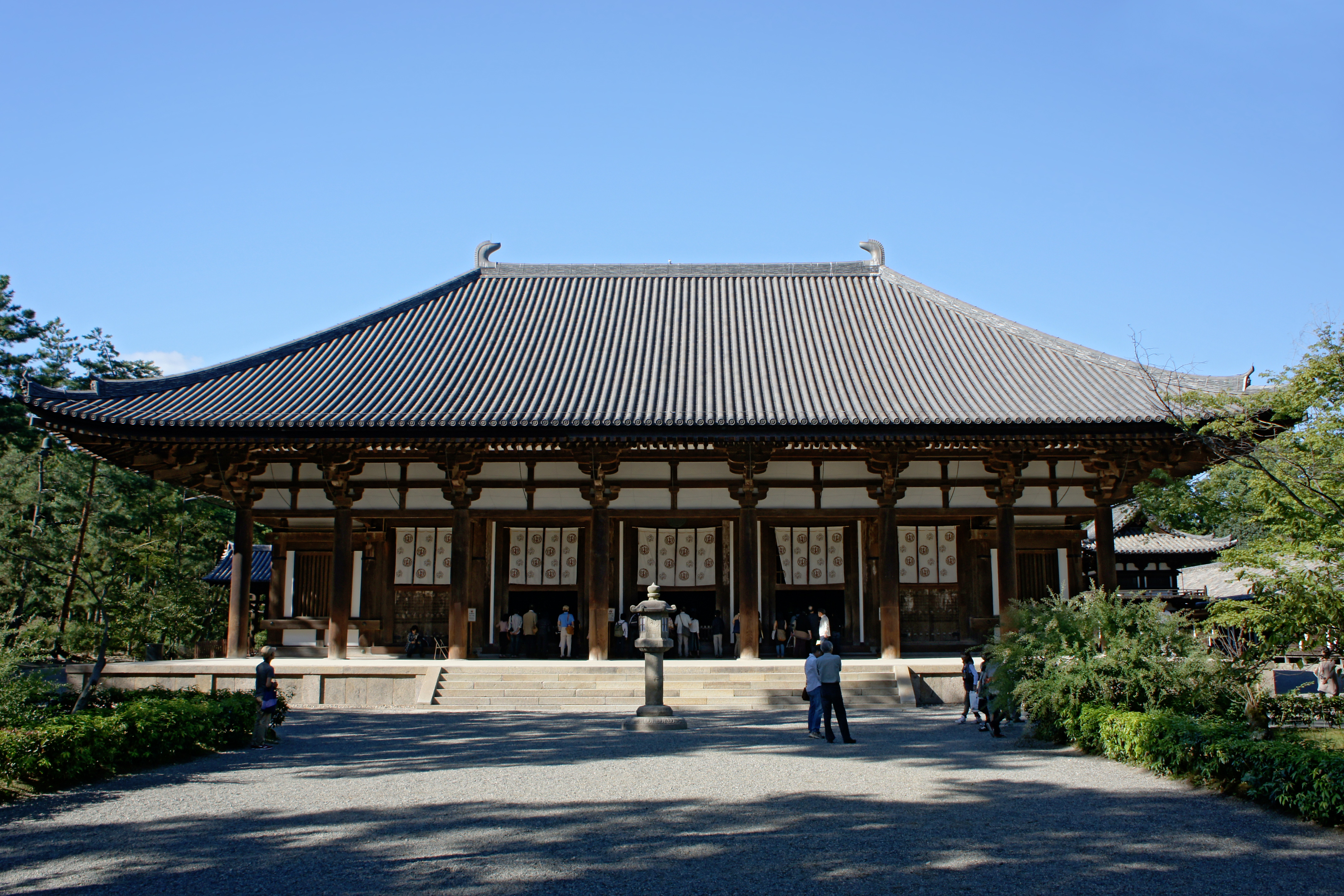
Golden Temple at Tōshōdai-ji, Nara, Nara
Built in 8th century

== Heian period ==
Although the network of Buddhist temples across the country acted as a catalyst for an exploration of architecture and culture, this also led to the clergy gaining increased power and influence. Emperor Kanmu decided to escape this influence by moving his capital first to Nagaoka-kyō and then to Heian-kyō, known today as Kyōto. Although the layout of the city was similar to Nara's and inspired by Chinese precedents, the palaces, temples and dwellings began to show examples of local Japanese taste.

Heavy materials like stone, mortar and clay were abandoned as building elements, with simple wooden walls, floors and partitions becoming prevalent. Native species like cedar (sugi) were popular as an interior finish because of its prominent grain, while pine (matsu) and larch (aka matsu) were common for structural uses. Brick roofing tiles and a type of cypress called hinoki were used for roofs. It was sometime during this period that the hidden roof, a uniquely Japanese solution to roof drainage problems, was adopted.

The increasing size of buildings in the capital led to an architecture reliant on columns regularly spaced in accordance with the ken, a traditional measure of both size and proportion. The imperial palace Shishinden demonstrated a style that was a precursor to the later aristocratic-style of building known as shinden-zukuri. The style was characterised by symmetrical buildings placed as arms that defined an inner garden. This garden then used borrowed scenery to seemingly blend with the wider landscape. A gradual increase in the size of buildings led to standard units of measurement as well as refinements in layout and garden design.

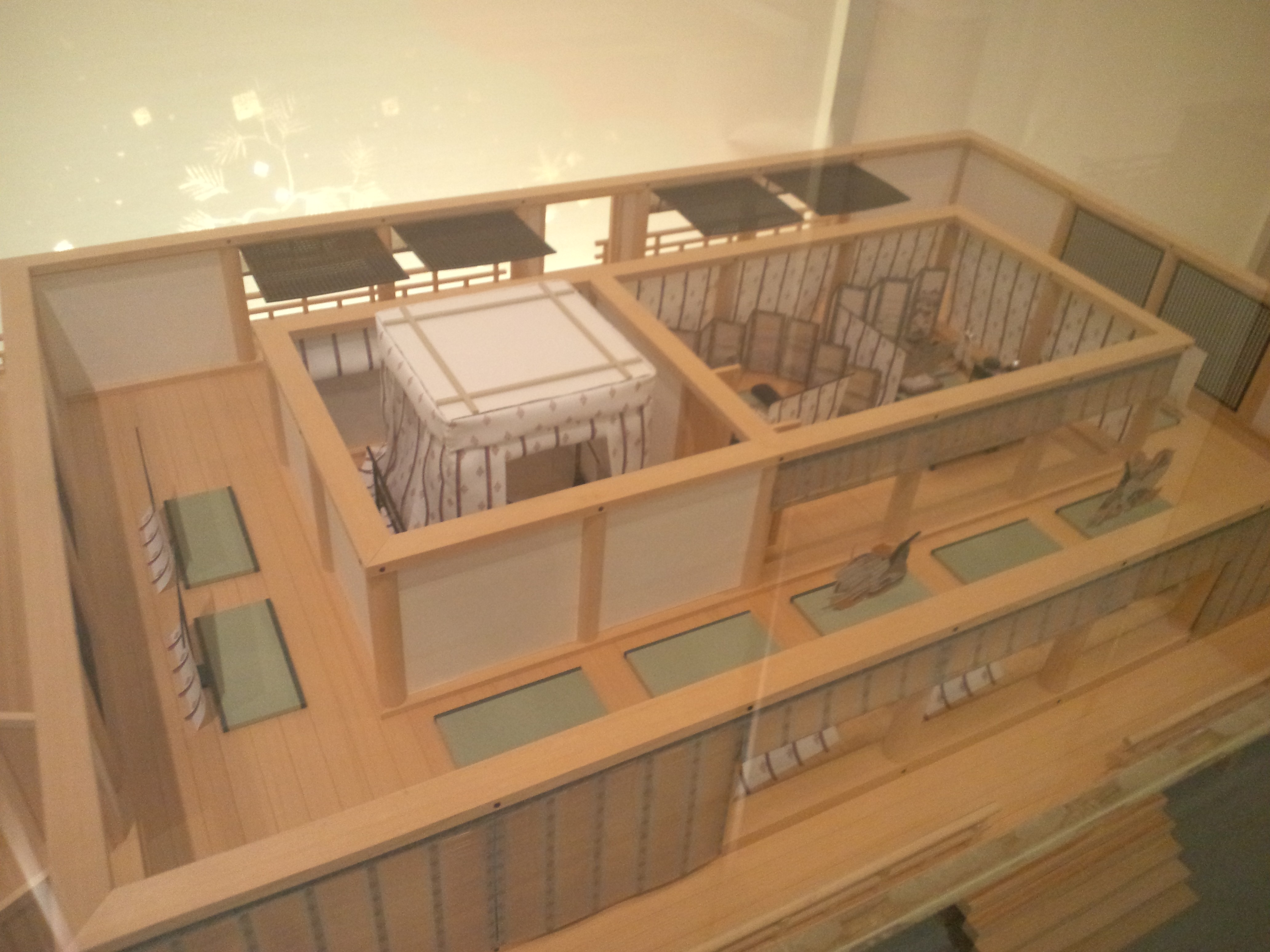
A model of the inner structure that represents the characteristics of shinden-zukuri. an open structure with few walls and openable doors and shitomi and sudare. The residents take off their shoes and go inside the house on stilts, where they sit or sleep directly on tatami mats spread over only part of the room without using chairs or beds.

In 894, Japan abolished kentōshi (Japanese missions to Tang China) and began to distance itself from Chinese culture, and a culture called Kokufu bunka (lit., Japanese culture) which was suited to the Japanese climate and aesthetic sense flourished. The shinden-zukuri style, which was the architectural style of the residences of nobles in this period, showed the distinct uniqueness of Japanese architecture and permanently determined the characteristics of later Japanese architecture. Its features are an open structure with few walls that can be opened and closed with doors and shitomi and sudare, a structure in which shoes are taken off to enter the house on stilts, sitting or sleeping directly on tatami mats without using chairs and beds, a roof made of laminated hinoki (Japanese cypress) bark instead of ceramic tiles, and a natural texture that is not painted on pillars. A Buddhist architectural style called Wayō, which developed in accordance with the Japanese climate and aesthetic sense, was established.

The priest Kūkai (best known by the posthumous title Kōbō Daishi, 774–835) journeyed to China to study Shingon, a form of Vajrayana Buddhism, which he introduced into Japan in 806. At the core of Shingon worship are the various mandalas, diagrams of the spiritual universe that influenced temple design. The temples erected for this new sect were built in the mountains, far away from the court and the laity in the capital. The irregular topography of these sites forced their designers to rethink the problems of temple construction, and in so doing to choose more indigenous elements of design.

At this time the architectural style of Buddhist temples began to influence that of the Shintō shrines. For example, like their Buddhist counterparts the Shintō shrines began to paint the normally unfinished timbers with the characteristic red cinnabar colour.

During the later part of the Heian period there were the first documented appearances of vernacular houses in the minka style/form. These were characterized by the use local materials and labor, being primarily constructed of wood, having packed earth floors and thatched roofs.

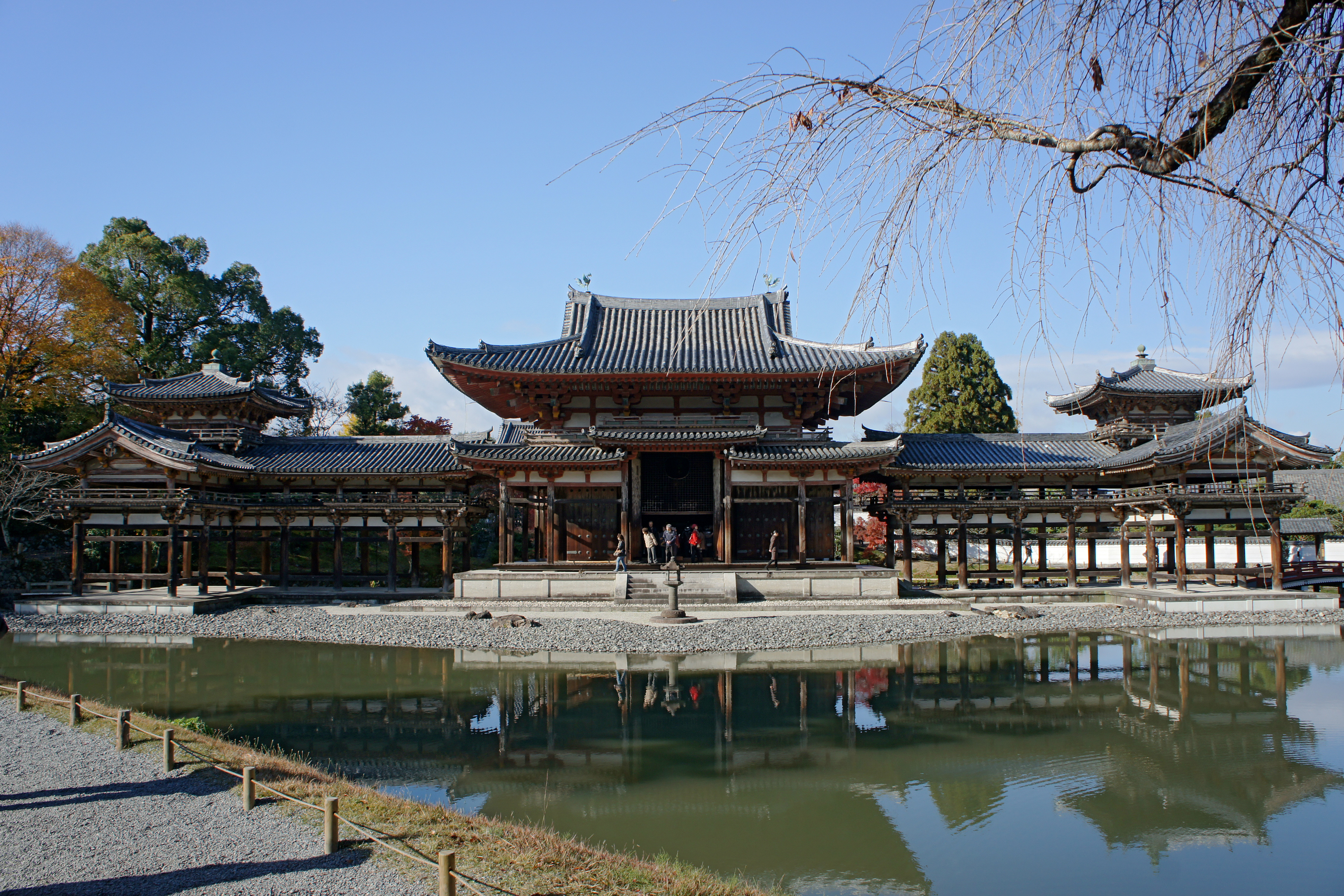
Phoenix Hall at Byōdō-in, Uji, Kyoto
Built in 1053

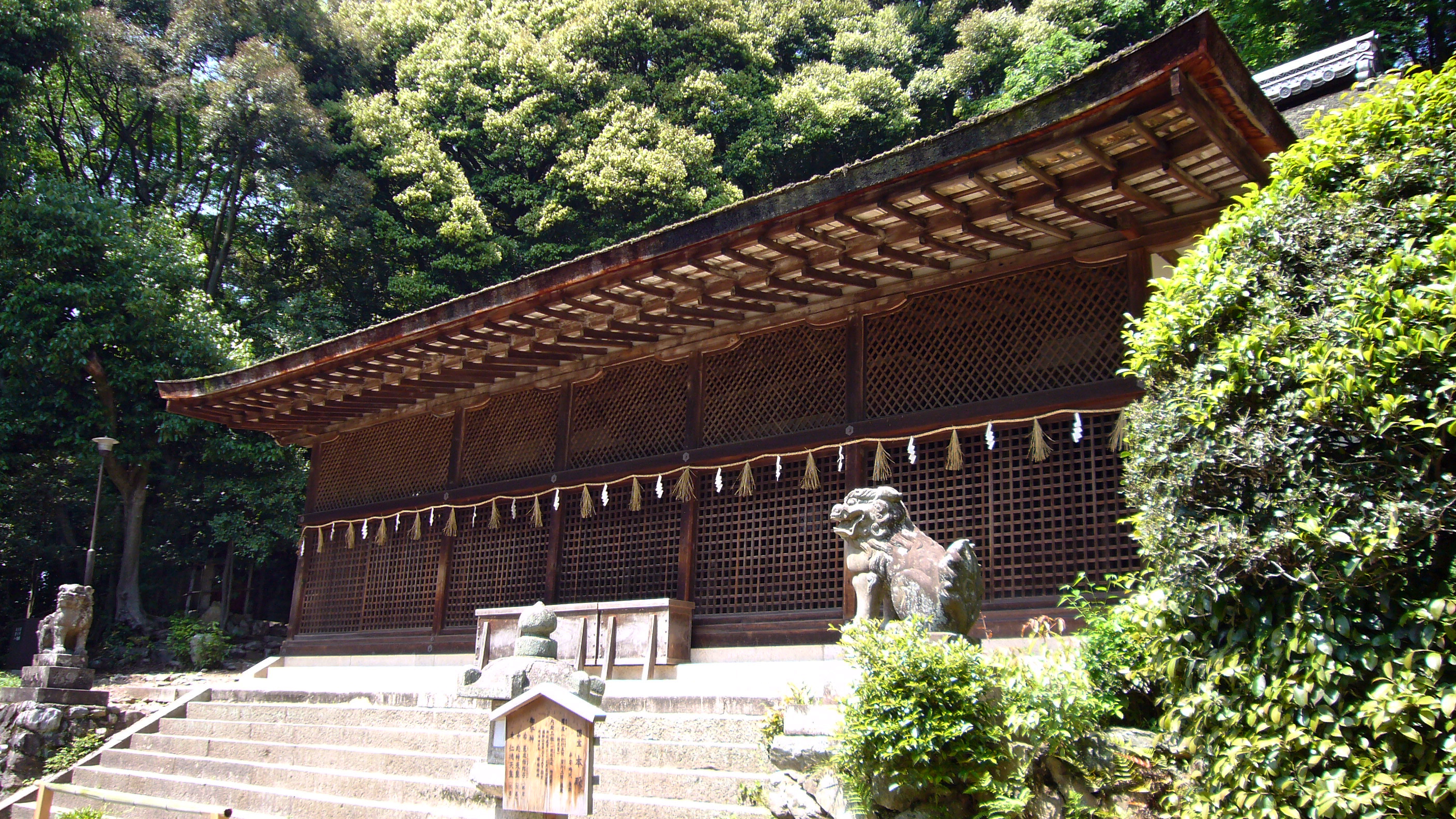
Ujigami Shrine, Uji, Kyoto
Built in 1060

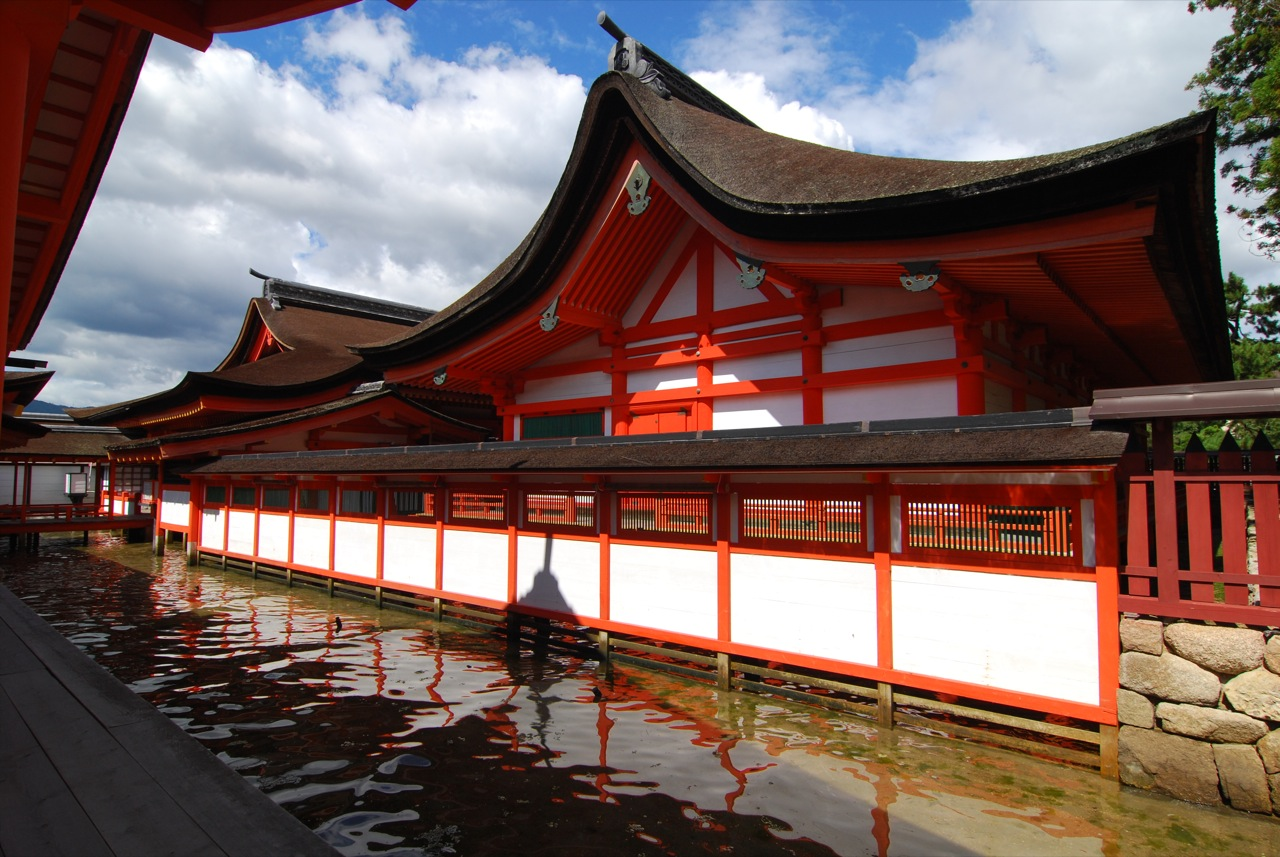
Itsukushima Shrine Honden, Hatsukaichi, Hiroshima
Built in 1168

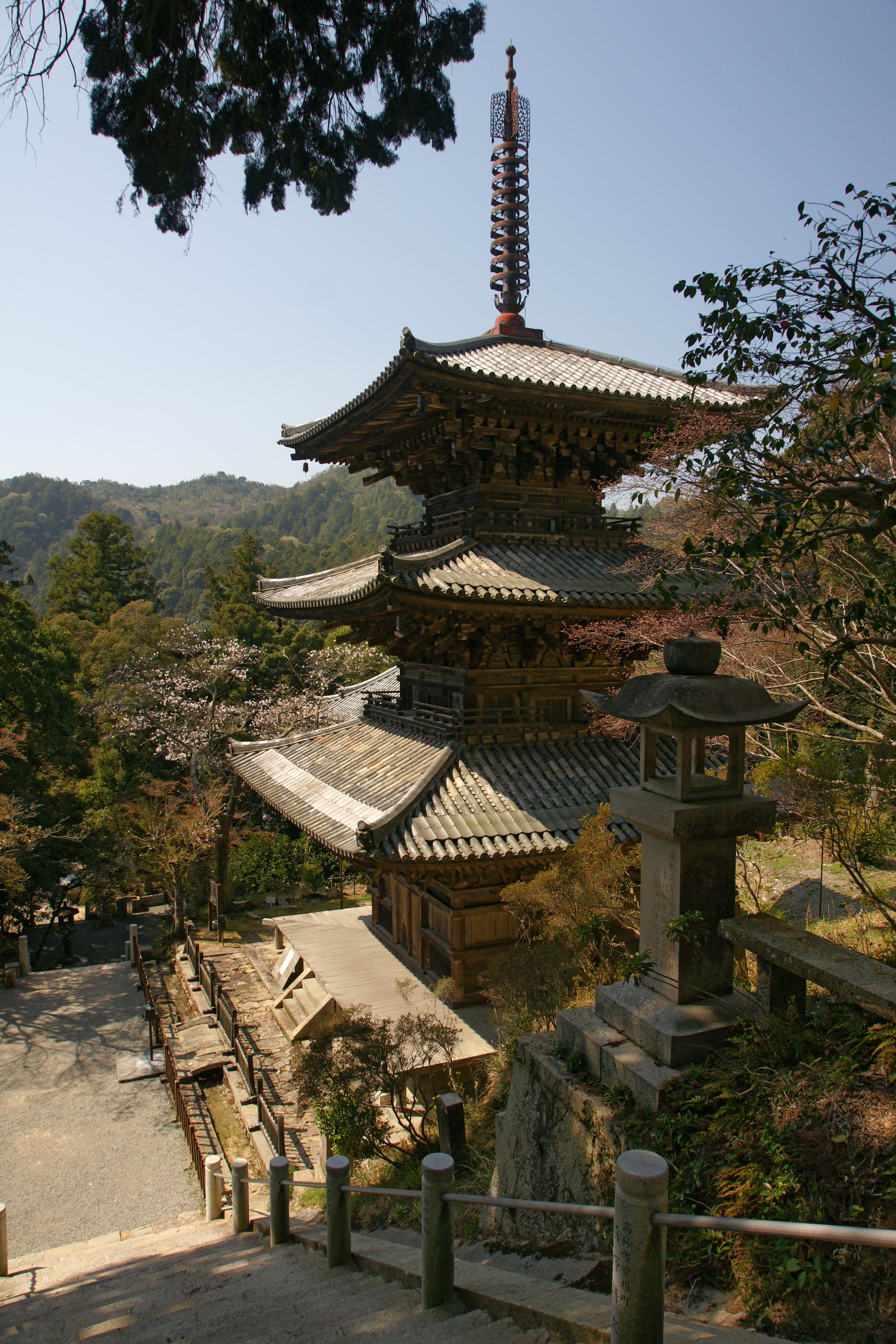
Pagoda of Ichijō-ji, Kasai, Hyōgo
Built in 1171

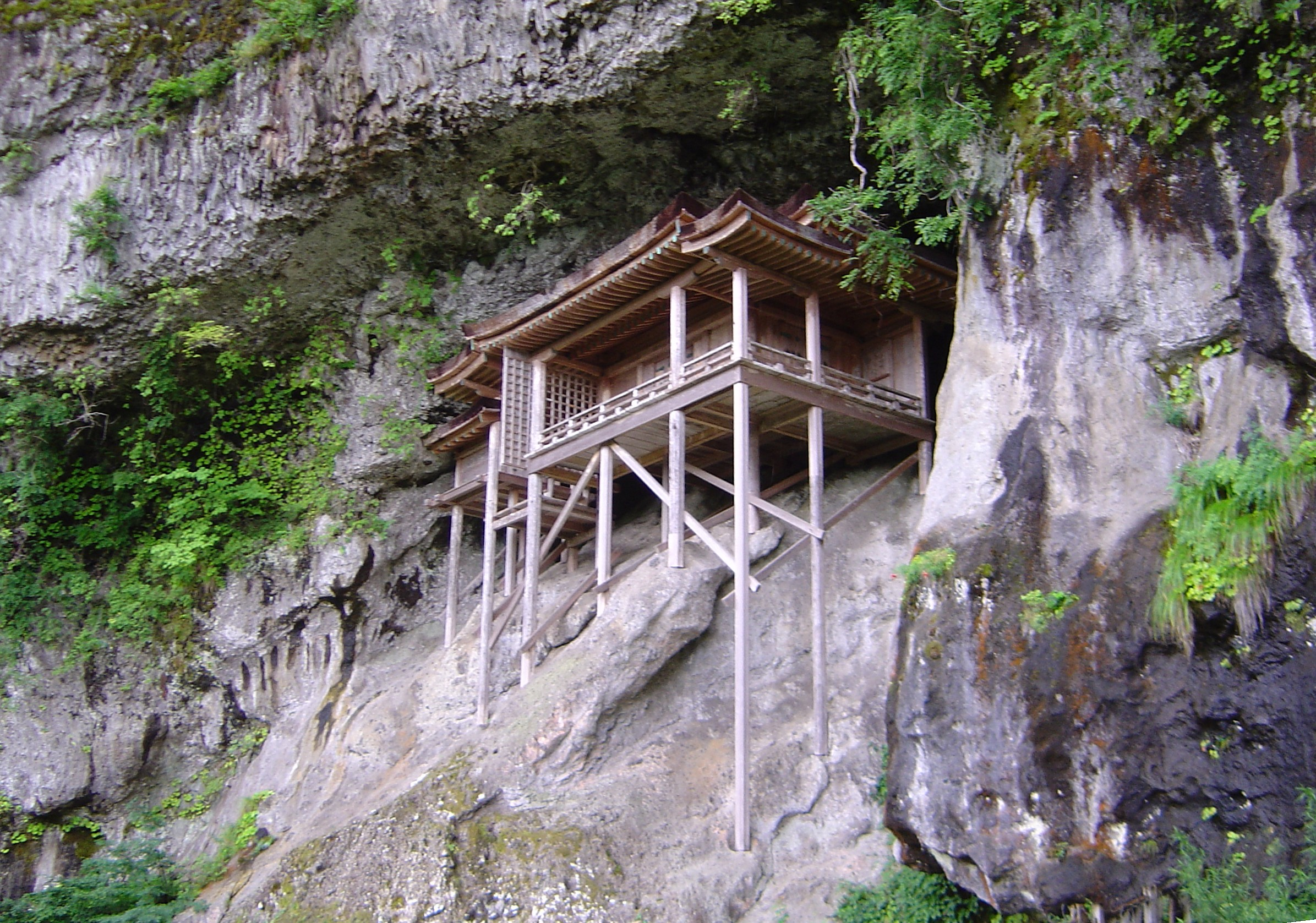
Nageire-dō of Sanbutsu-ji, Misasa, Tottori

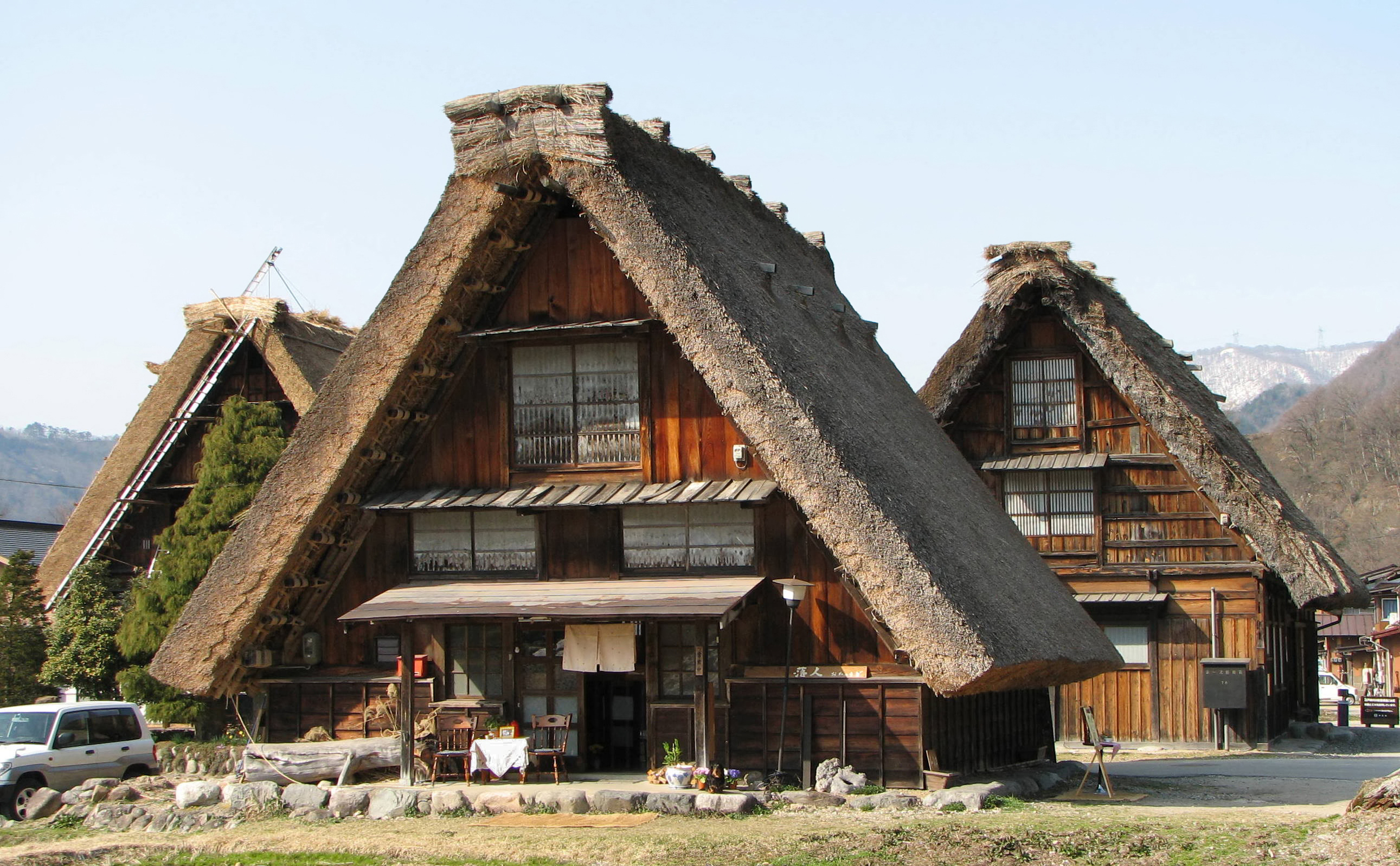
Typical minka-style gasshō-zukuri farmhouse

== Kamakura and Muromachi periods ==
During the Kamakura period (1185–1333) and the following Muromachi period (1336–1573), Japanese Buddhist architecture made technological advances that made it diverge from its Chinese counterpart. In response to native requirements such as earthquake resistance and shelter against heavy rainfall and the summer heat and sun, the master carpenters of this time responded with a unique type of architecture, creating the Daibutsuyō and Zenshūyō styles. The Wayō style was combined with Daibutsuyō and the Zenshūyō to create the Shin-Wayō and the Setchūyō styles, and the number of temples in the pure Wayō style decreased after the 14th century.

The Kamakura period began with the transfer of power in Japan from the imperial court to the Kamakura shogunate. During the Genpei War (1180–1185), many traditional buildings in Nara and Kyoto were damaged. For example, Kōfuku-ji and Tōdai-ji were burned down by Taira no Shigehira of the Taira clan in 1180. Many of these temples and shrines were later rebuilt by the Kamakura shogunate to consolidate the shōgun's authority.

Although less elaborate than during the Heian period, architecture in the Kamakura period was informed by a simplicity due to its association with the military order. New residences used a buke-zukuri style that was associated with buildings surrounded by narrow moats or stockades. Defense became a priority, with buildings grouped under a single roof rather than around a garden. The gardens of the Heian period houses often became training grounds.

After the fall of the Kamakura shogunate in 1333, the Ashikaga shogunate was formed, having later its seat in the Kyoto district of Muromachi. The proximity of the shogunate to the imperial court led to a rivalry in the upper levels of society which caused tendencies toward luxurious goods and lifestyles. Aristocratic houses were adapted from the simple buke-zukuri style to resemble the earlier shinden-zukuri style. A good example of this ostentatious architecture is the Kinkaku-ji in Kyōto, which is decorated with lacquer and gold leaf, in contrast to its otherwise simple structure and plain bark roofs.

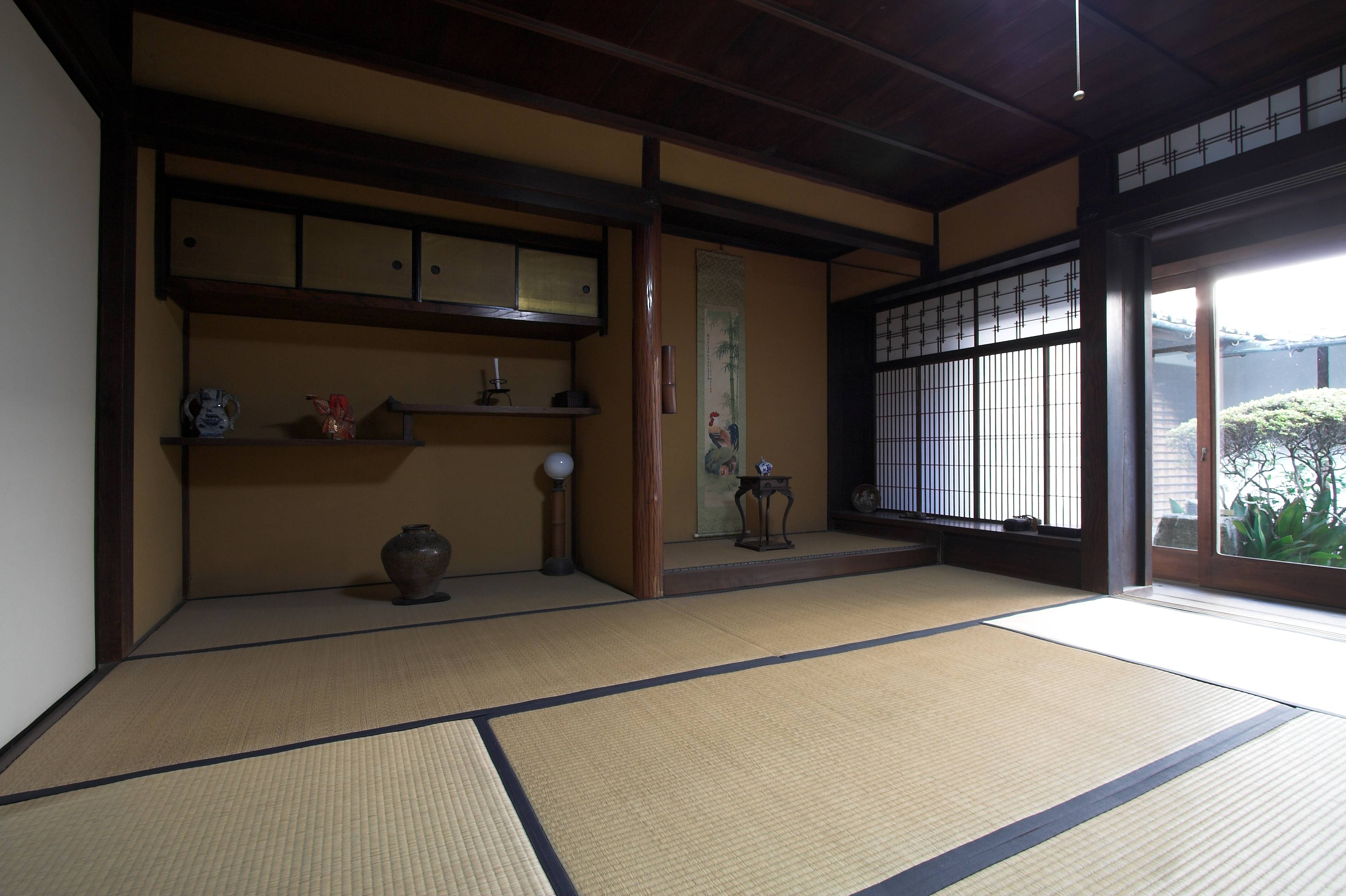
The interior of a typical shoin-zukuri style room. There are tatami mats all over the floor, fusuma on the left, chigaidana and tokonoma in the center, and shoji on the right.

During the Muromachi period, shinden-zukuri style, which was the mainstream of the residences of Japanese nobles, declined, and shoin-zukuri, which developed from buke-zukuri of samurai class residences, became the mainstream. Shoin-zukuri had a lasting impact on later Japanese housing and is the basis of modern Japanese housing. In the old architectural style, tatami mats were laid only in a part of the room, but in the shoin-zukuri style, tatami mats were laid all over the room. In this style, sliding doors called fusuma were used to separate rooms, and an inner window called shoji, which was made by pasting paper permeable to sunlight on a wooden frame, was installed inside the wooden shutters. In the room, tokonoma (alcove for the display of art objects) and chigaidana (shelves built into the wall) were set up to decorate various things.

In an attempt to rein in the excess of the upper classes, the Zen masters introduced the tea ceremony. In architecture this promoted the design of chashitsu (tea houses) to a modest size with simple detailing and materials. A typically sized Chashitsu is 4 1/2 tatami mats in size.

In the garden, Zen principles replaced water with sand or gravel to produce the dry garden (karesansui) like the one at Ryōan-ji.

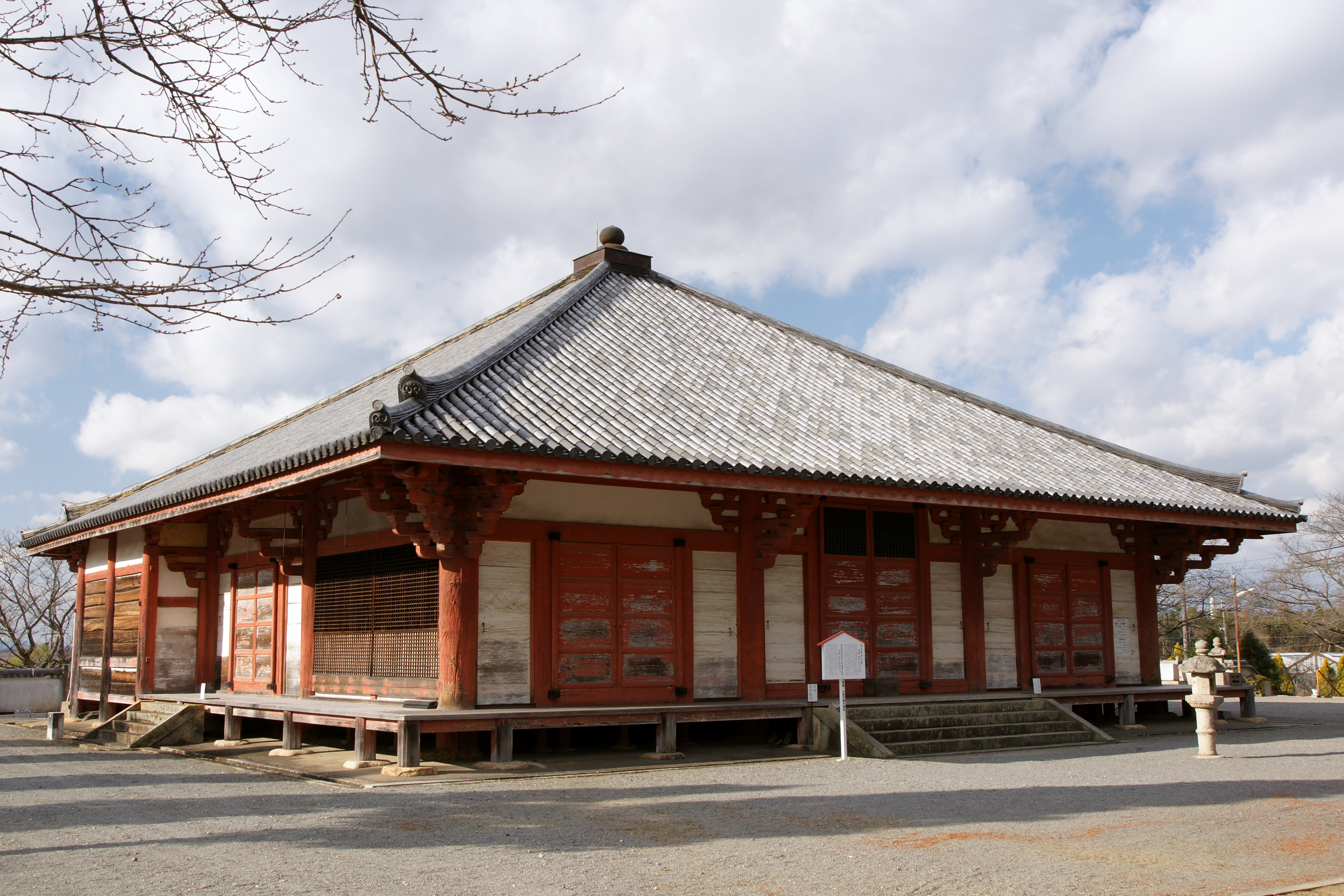
Jōdodō of Jōdo-ji, Ono, Hyōgo
Built in 1194

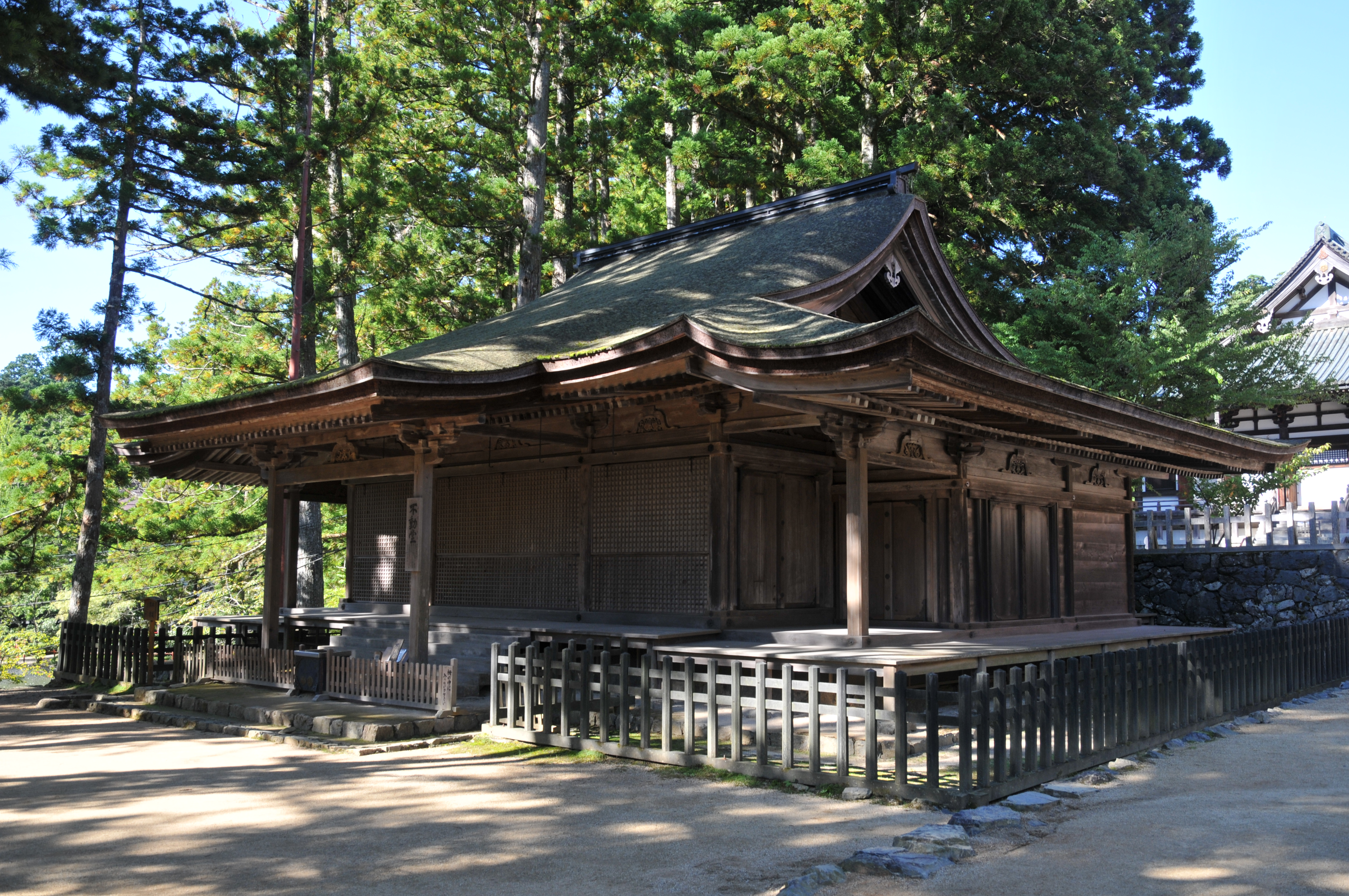
Danjogaran Fudo-dō in Mt. Kōya, Wakayama
Built in 1197

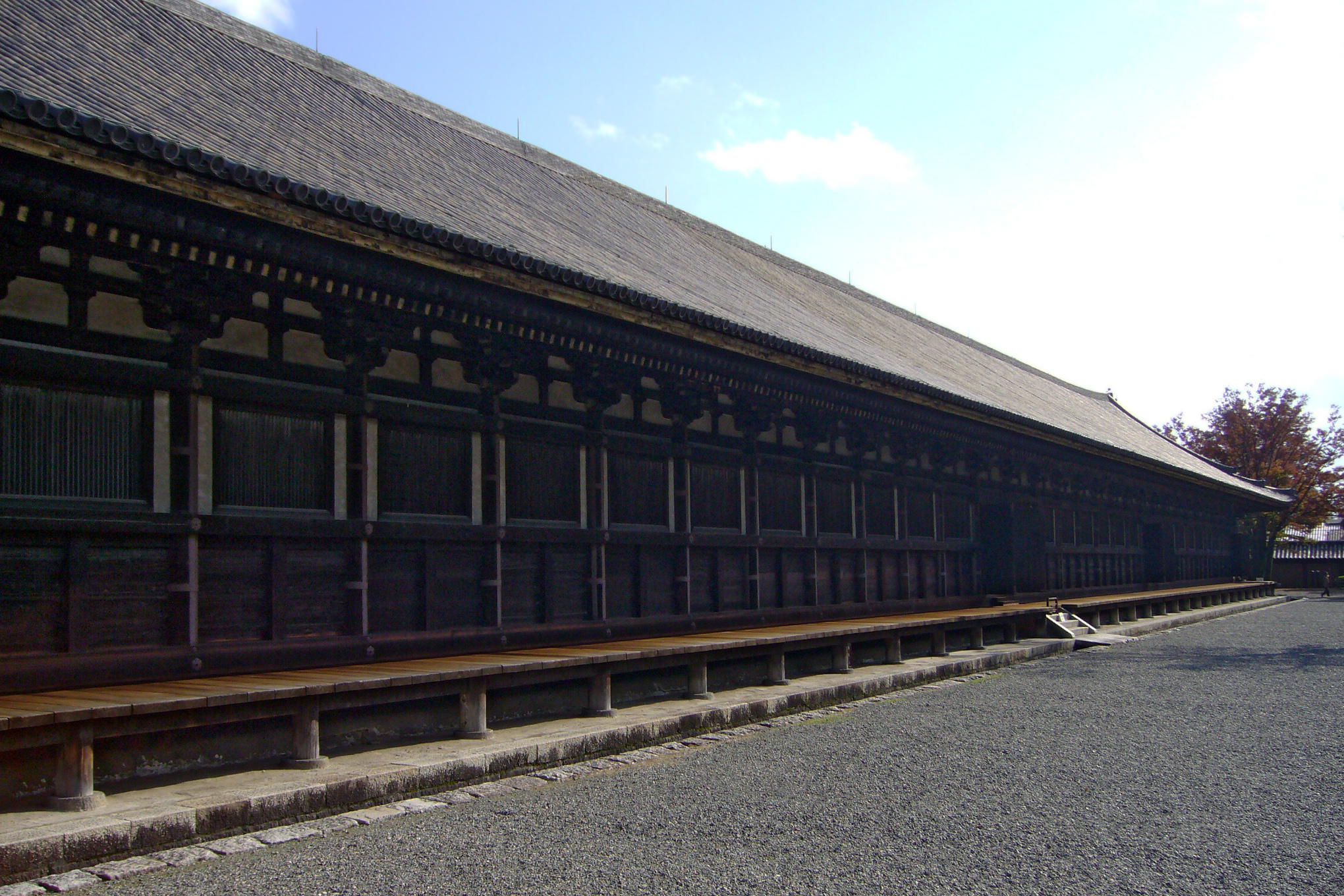
Sanjūsangen-dō, Kyoto
Built in 1266

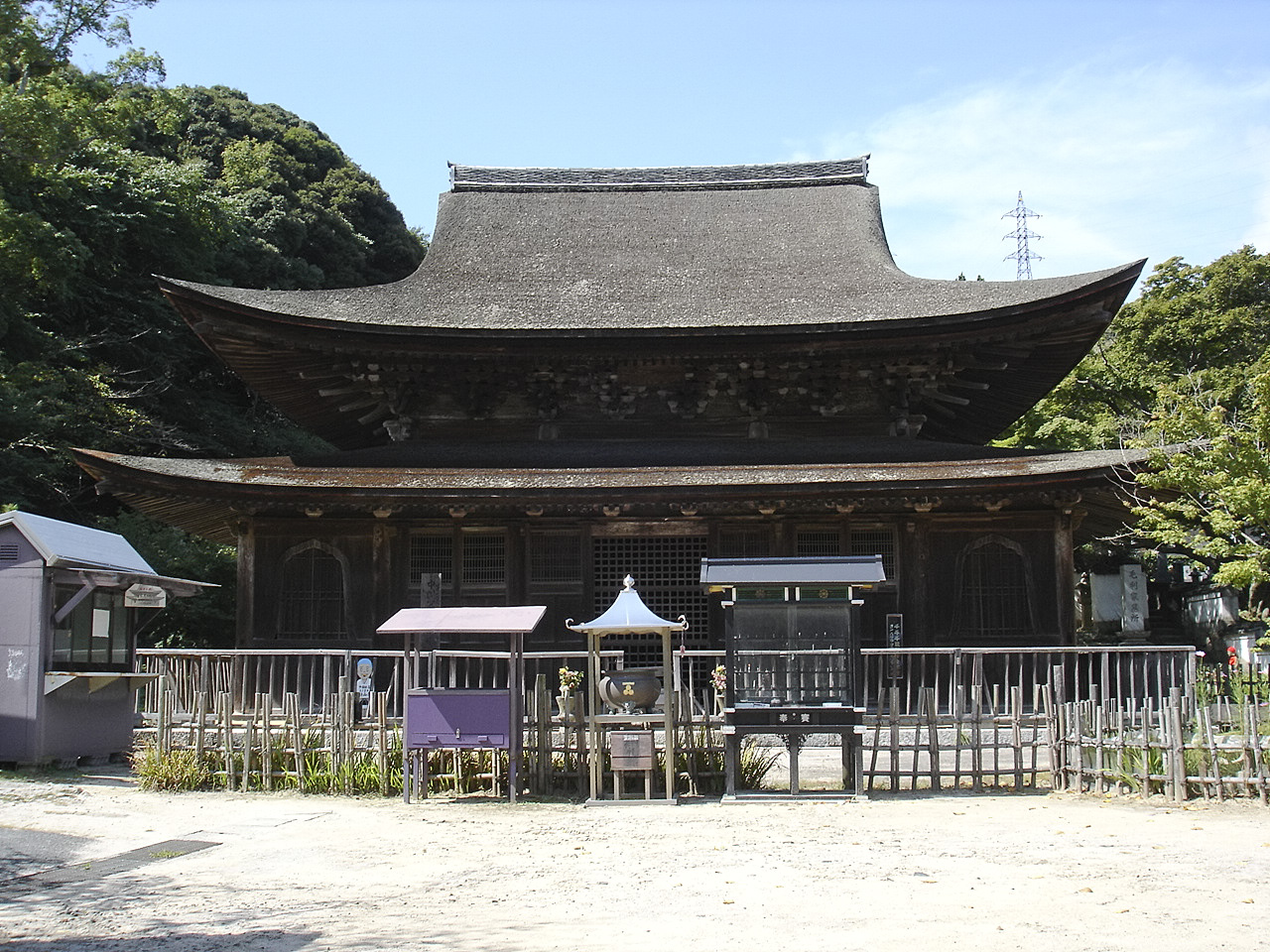
Butsuden of Kōzan-ji, Shimonoseki, Yamaguchi
Built in 1320

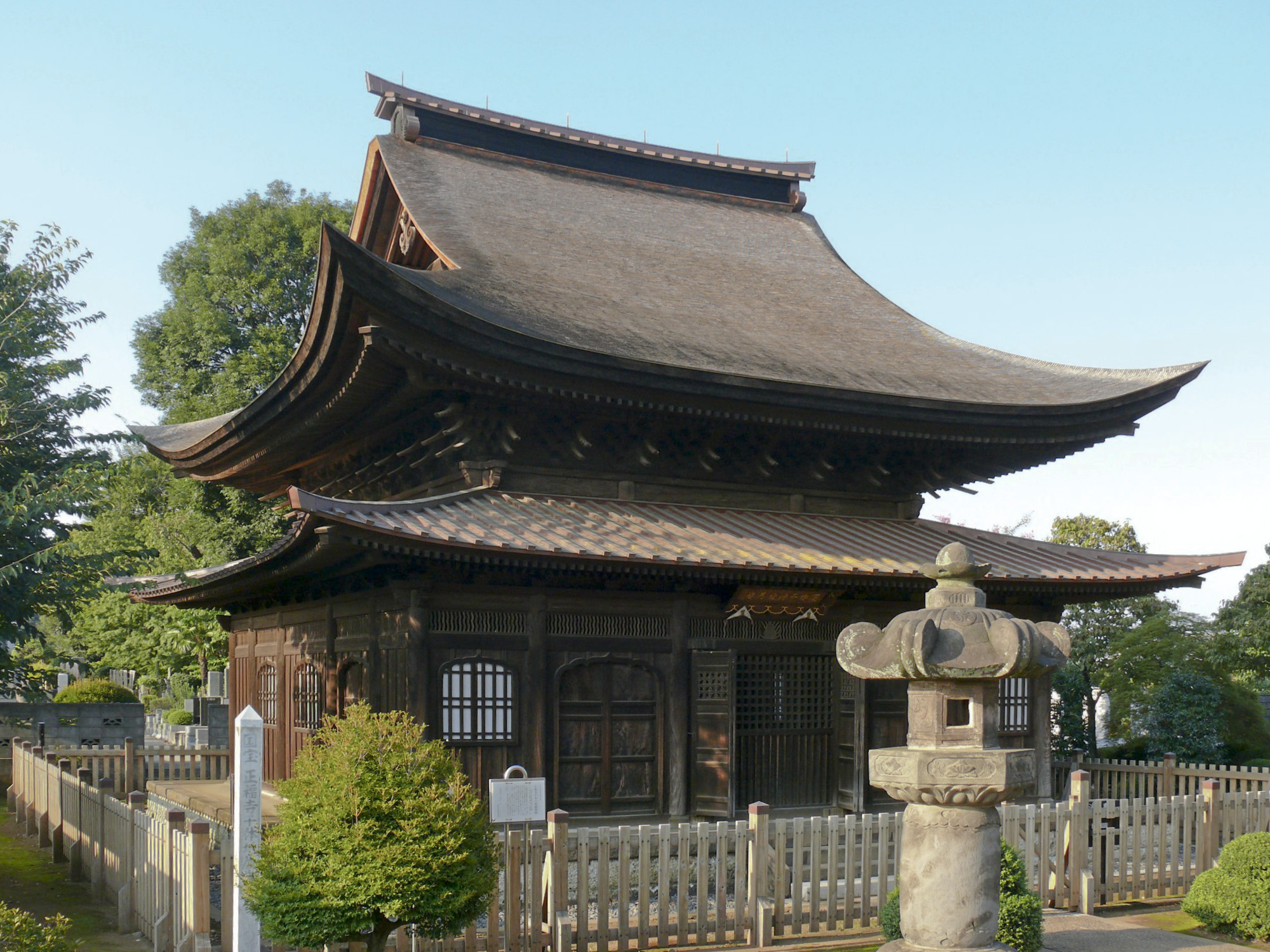
Shōfuku-ji, Tokyo, Completed in 1407

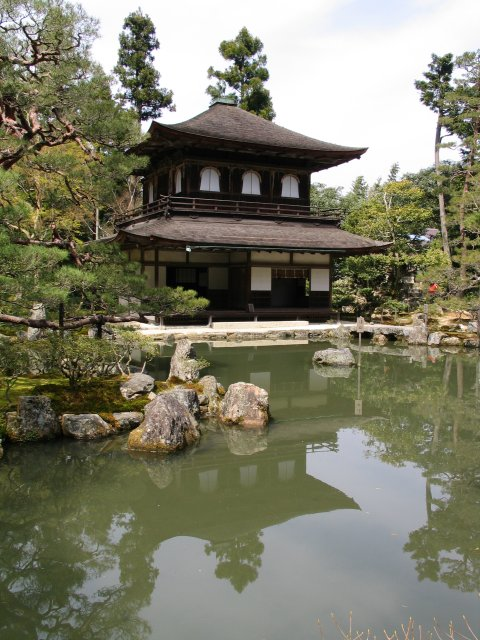
Ginkaku-ji, Kyoto
Built in the 15th century

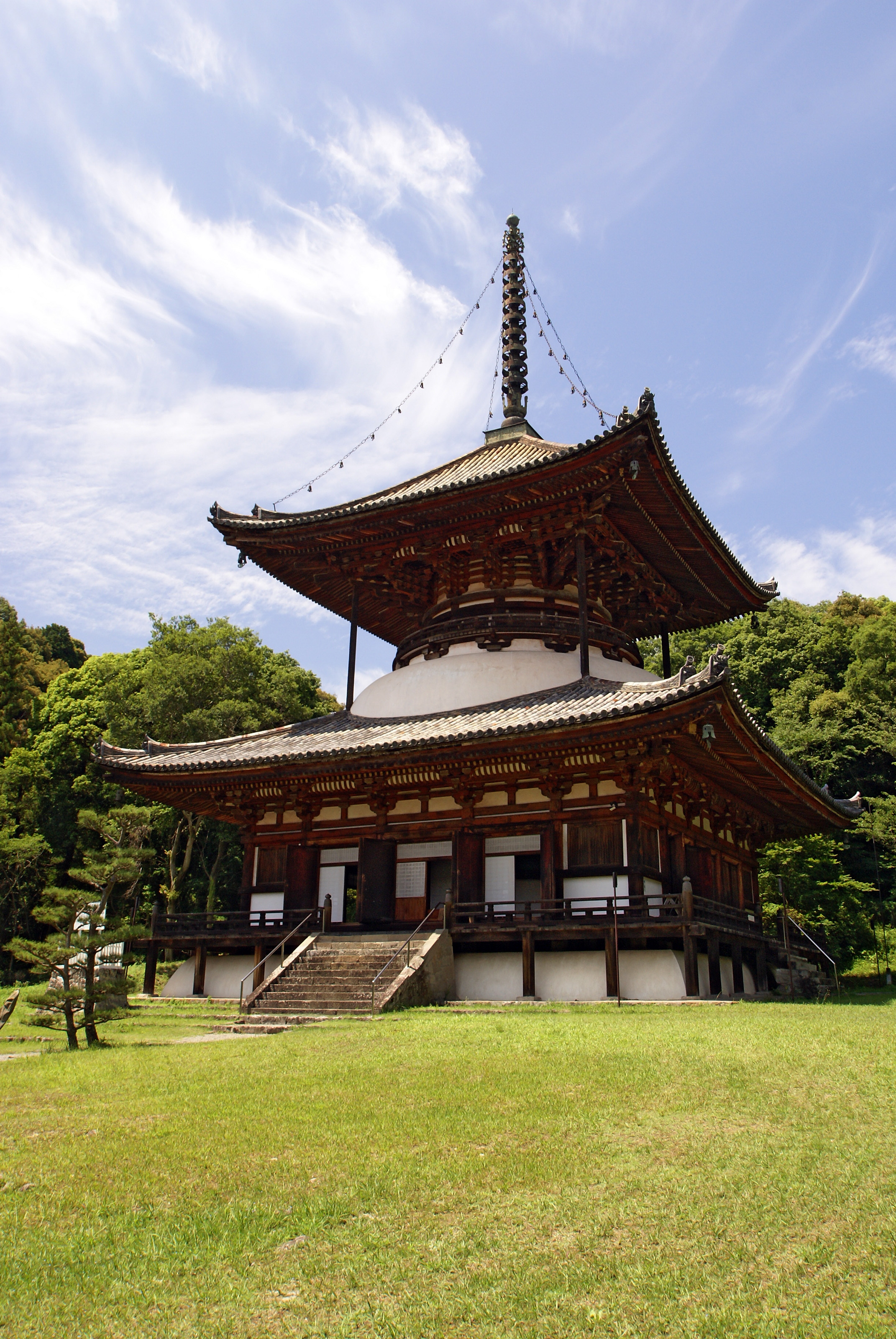
Pagoda of Negoro-ji in Iwade, Wakayama
Built in 1547.

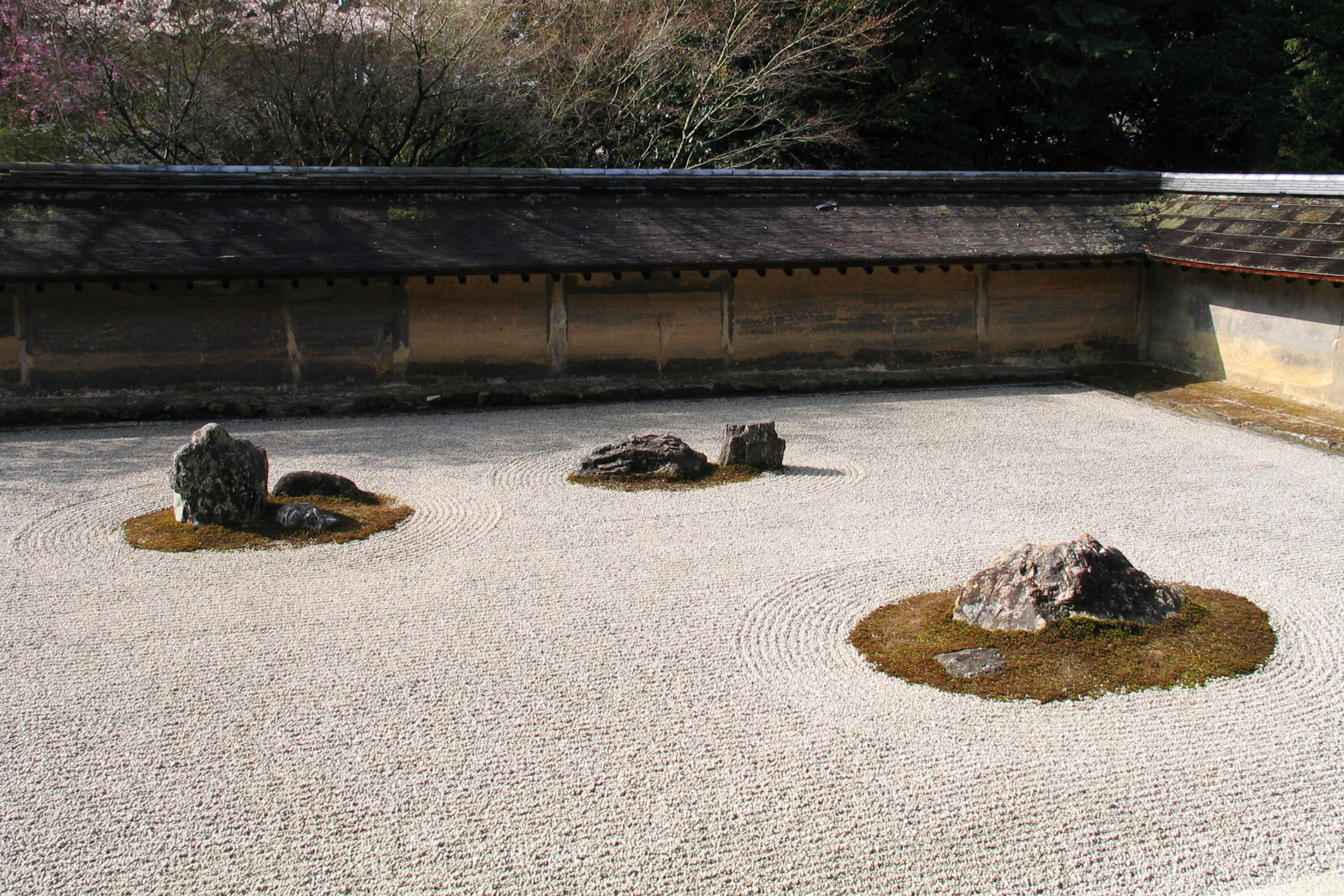
Ryōan-ji dry garden in Kyoto

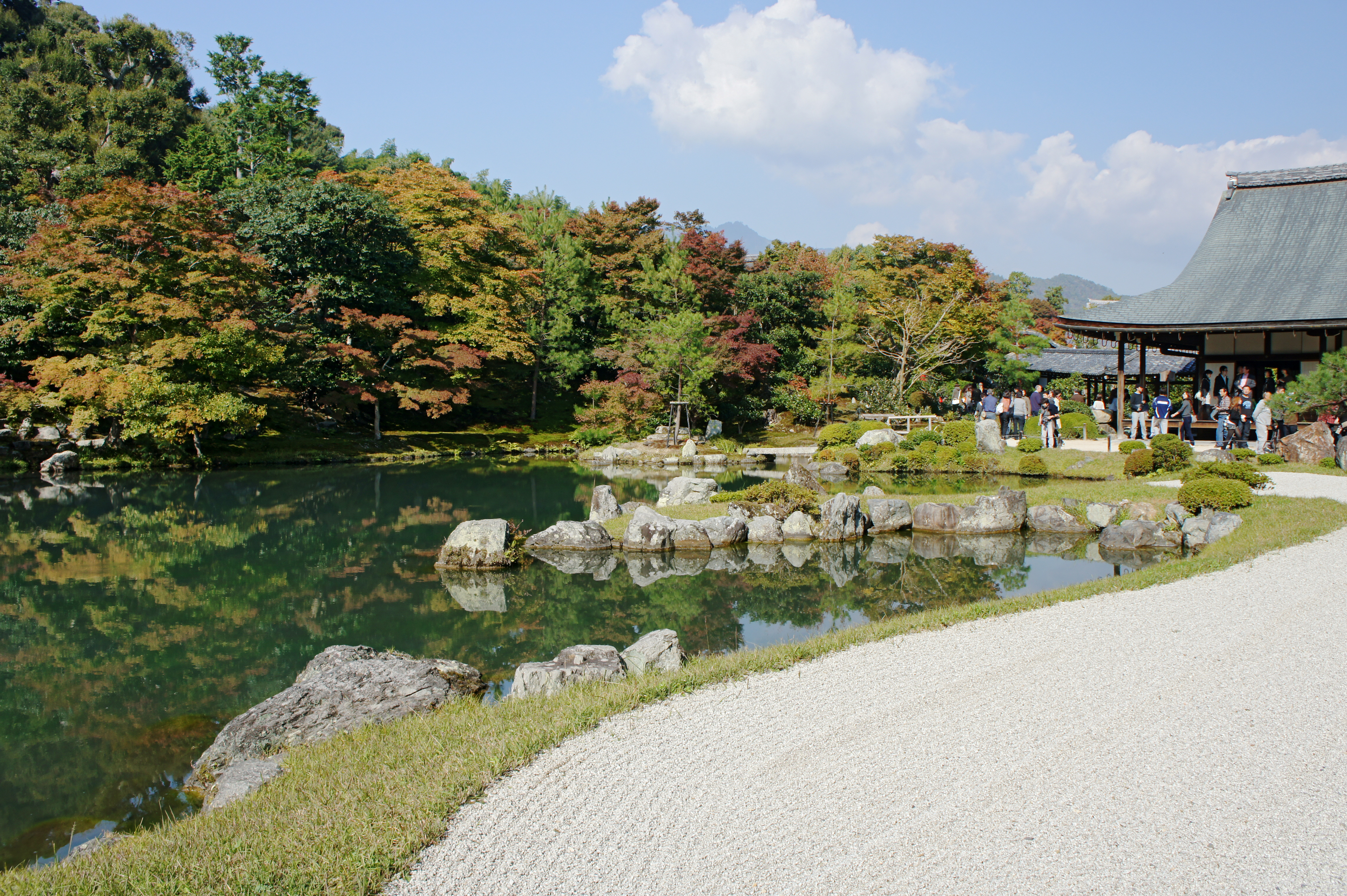
Garden of Tenryū-ji in Kyoto

== Azuchi-Momoyama period ==
During the Azuchi–Momoyama period (1568–1600) Japan underwent a process of unification after a long period of civil war. It was marked by the rule of Oda Nobunaga and Toyotomi Hideyoshi, men who built castles as symbols of their power; Nobunaga in Azuchi, the seat of his government, and Hideyoshi in Momoyama. The Ōnin War during the Muromachi period had led to rise of castle architecture in Japan. By the time of the Azuchi-Momoyama period each domain was allowed to have one castle of its own. Typically it consisted of a central tower or tenshu (天守; lit. heaven defense) surrounded by gardens and fortified buildings. All of this was set within massive stone walls and surrounded by deep moats. The dark interiors of castles were often decorated by artists, the spaces were separated up using sliding fusuma panels and byōbu folding screens.

The Shoin-zukuri style in the Muromachi period continued to be refined. Verandas linked the interiors of residential buildings with highly cultivated exterior gardens. Fusuma and byōbu became highly decorated with paintings and often an interior room with shelving and alcove (tokonoma) were used to display art work (typically a hanging scroll).

During this period, sukiya-zukuri style villas appeared under the influence of a tea house called chashitsu (tea house).

Matsumoto, Kumamoto and Himeji (popularly known as the White Heron castle) are excellent examples of the castles of the period, while Nijō Castle in Kyōto is an example of castle architecture blended with that of an imperial palace, to produce a style that is more in keeping with the Chinese influence of previous centuries.

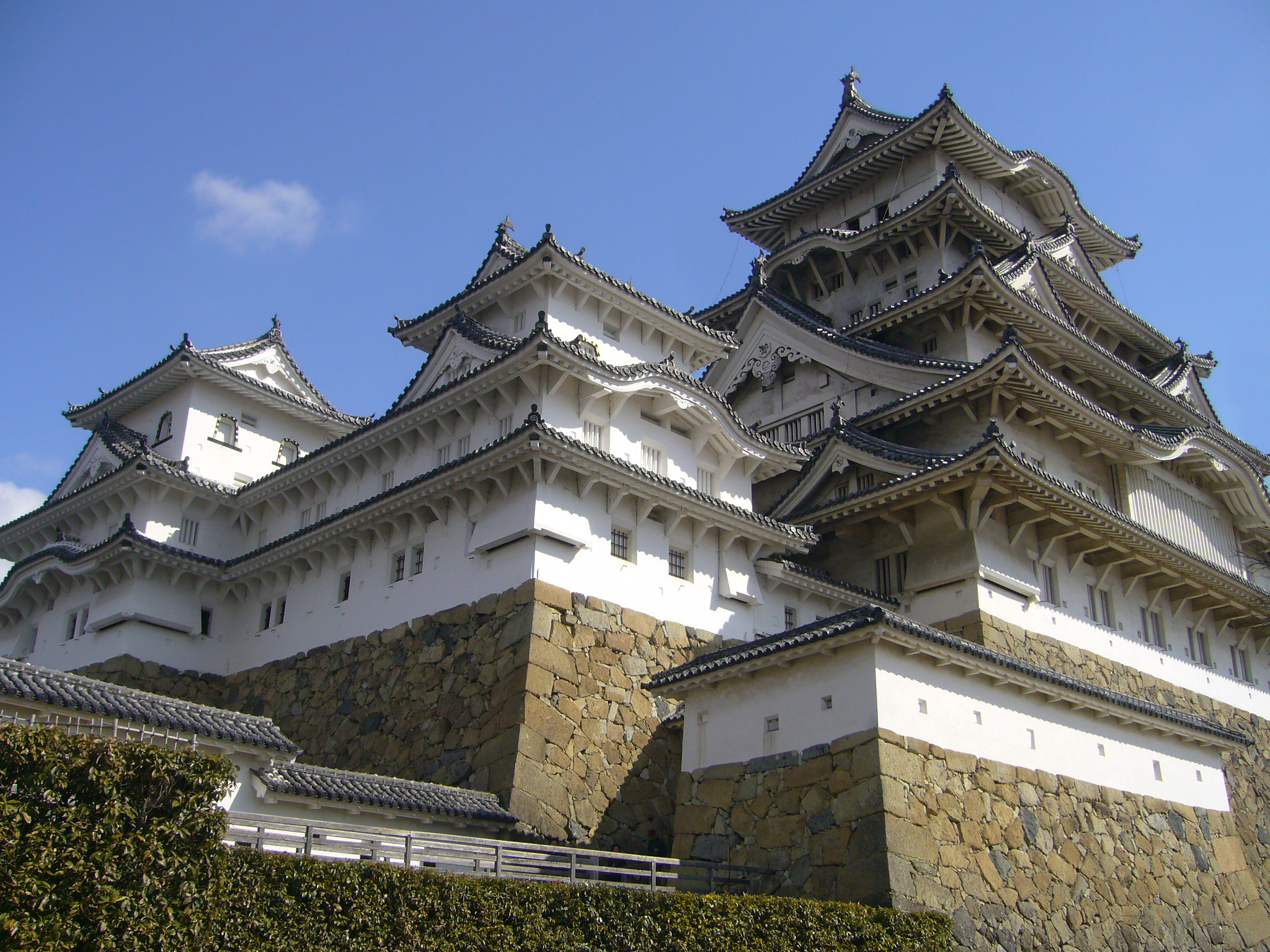
Himeji Castle in Himeji, Hyōgo,
Completed in 1618

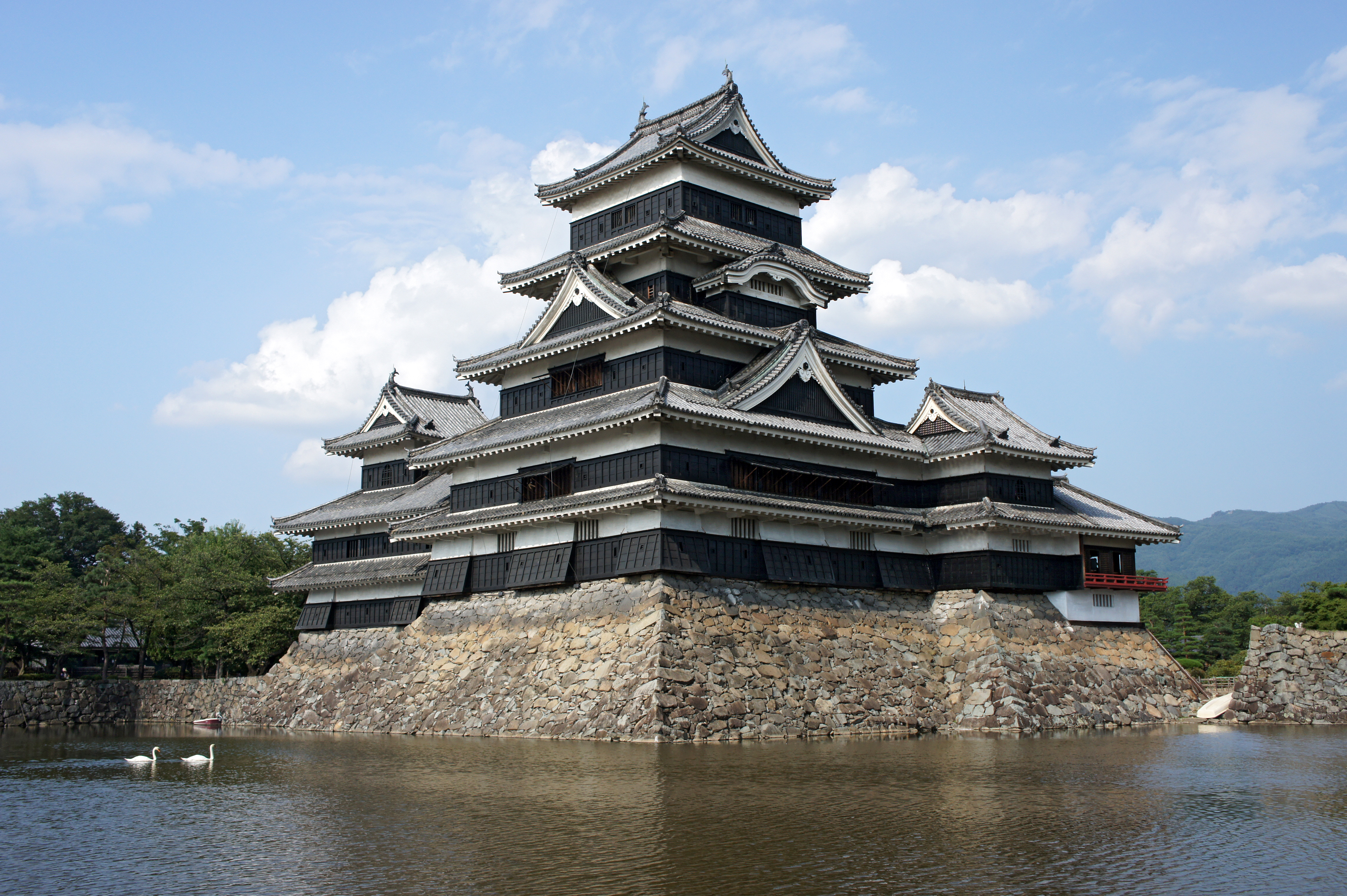
Matsumoto Castle in Matsumoto, Nagano,
Completed in 1600

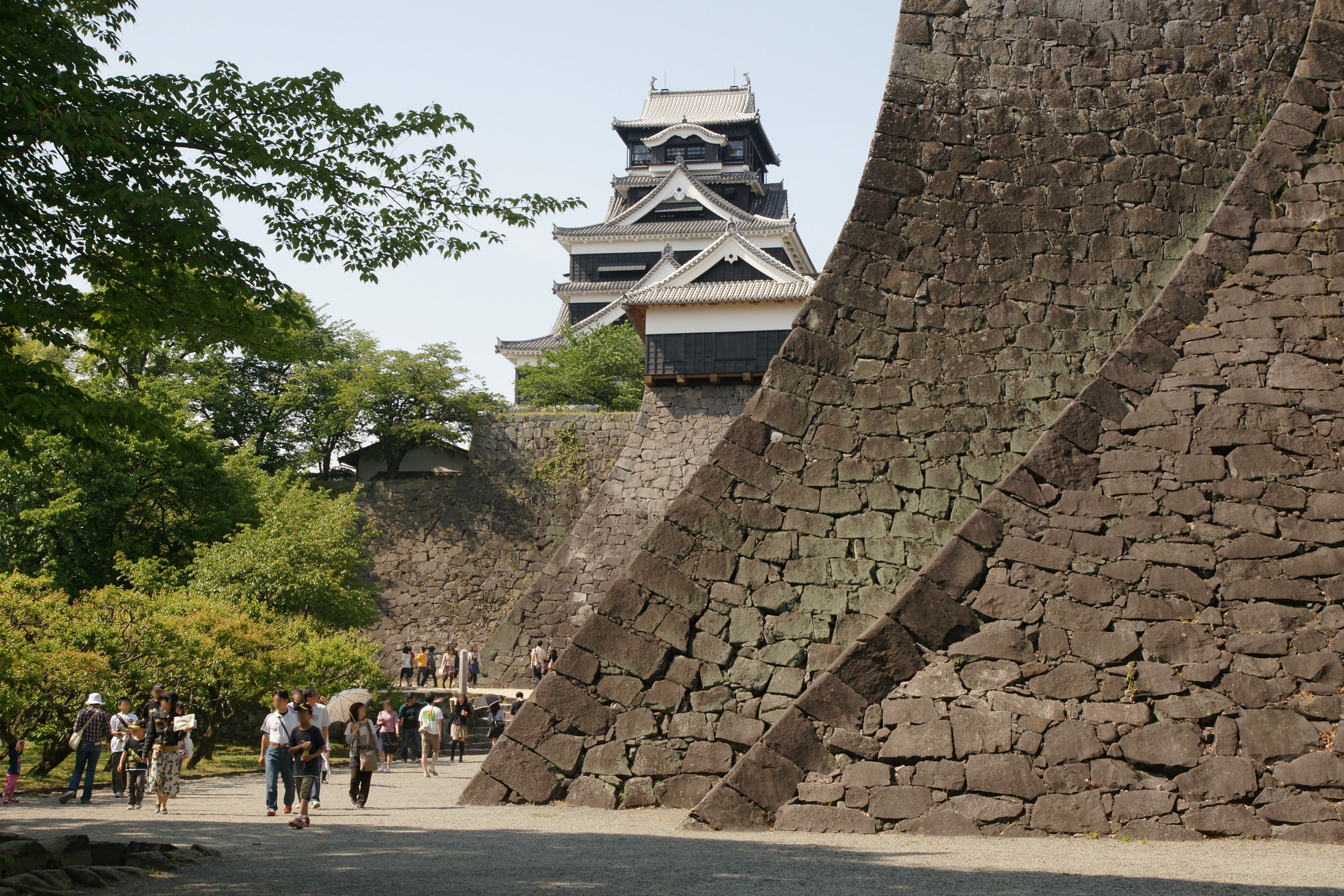
Dry stone walls of Kumamoto Castle,
Completed in 1600.

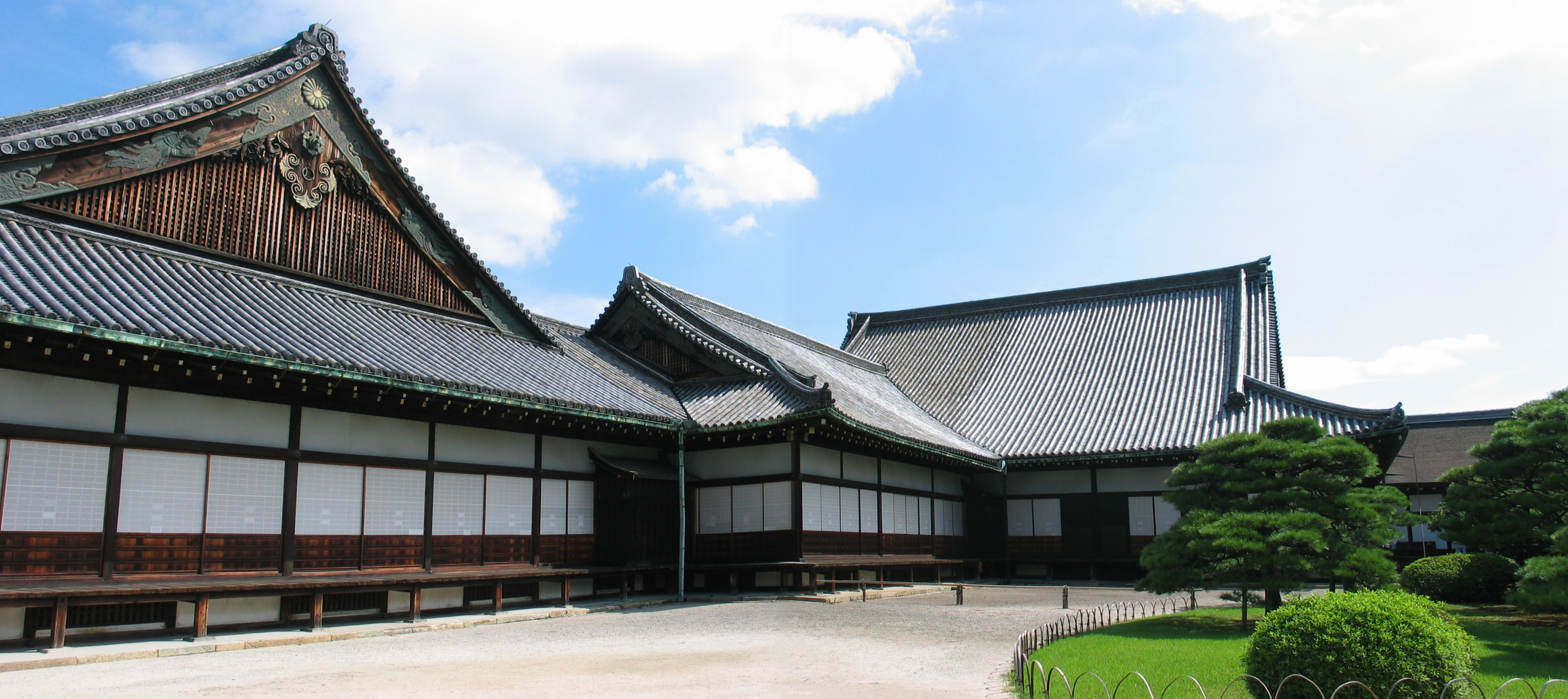
Ninomaru Palace within Nijō Castle, Kyoto

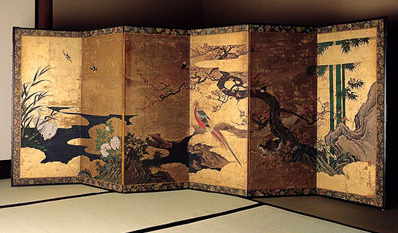
A six-panel byōbu from the 17th century

== Edo period ==
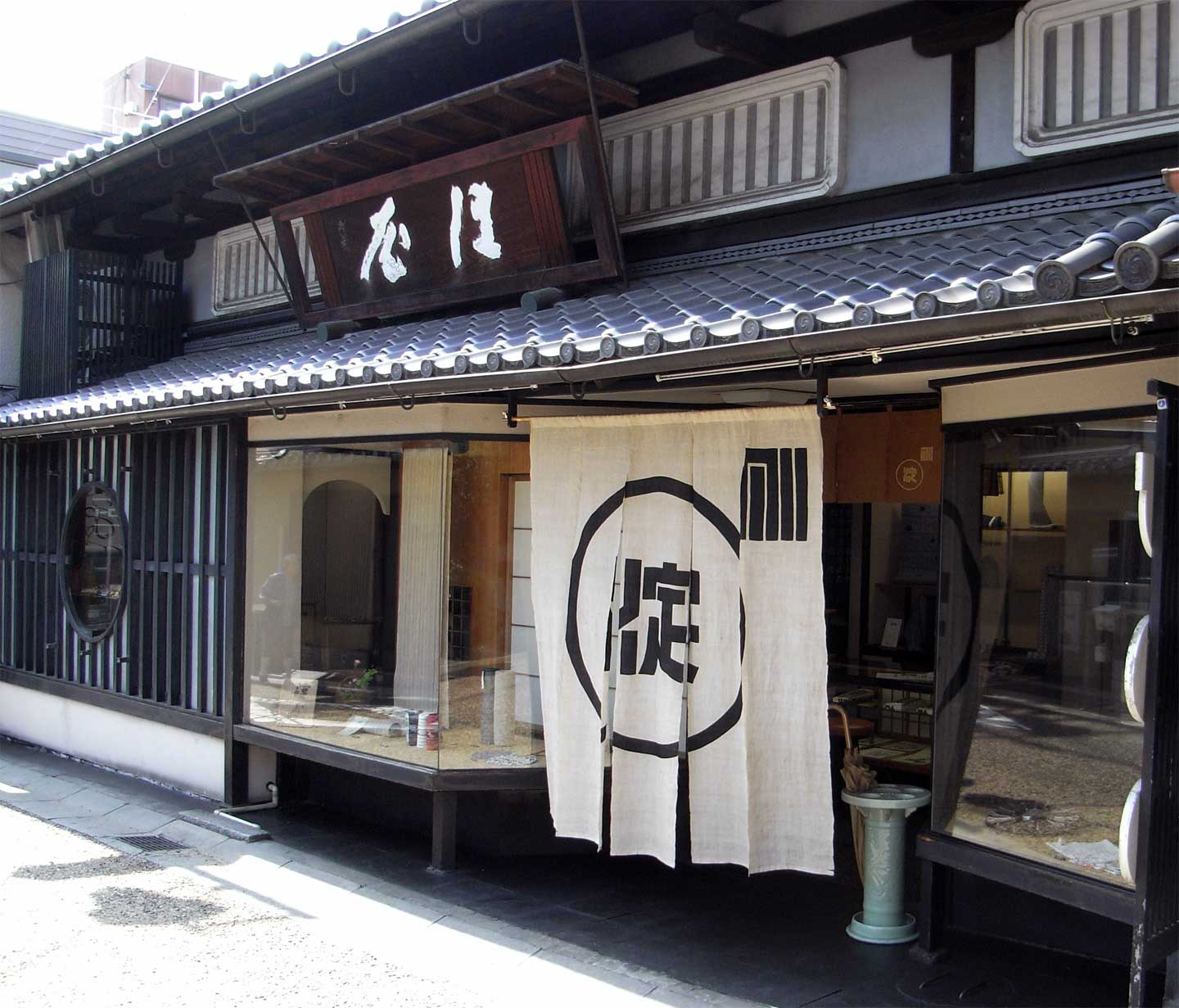
Typical machiya in Nara

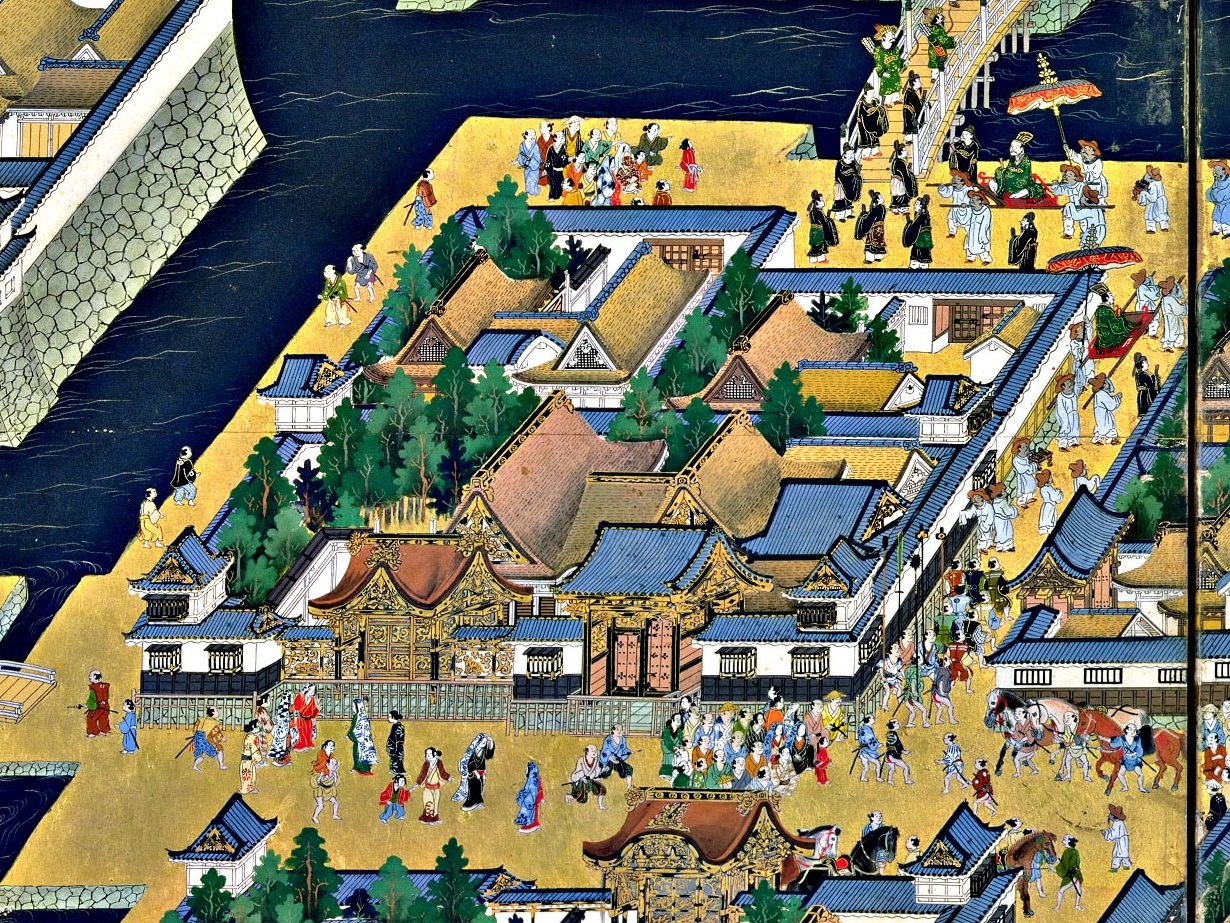
Upper residence of Matsudaira Tadamasa as depicted in the Edo-zu byōbu screens (17th century)

The Tokugawa shogunate took the city of Edo (later to become part of modern-day Tōkyō) as their capital. They built an imposing fortress around which buildings of the state administration and residences for the provincial daimyōs were constructed. The city grew around these buildings connected by a network of roads and canals. By 1700 the population had swollen to one million inhabitants. The scarcity of space for residential architecture resulted in houses being built over two stories, often constructed on raised stone plinths.

Although machiya (townhouses) had been around since the Heian period they began to be refined during the Edo period. Machiya typically occupied deep, narrow plots abutting the street (the width of the plot was usually indicative of the wealth of the owner), often with a workshop or shop on the ground floor. Tiles rather than thatch were used on the roof and exposed timbers were often plastered in an effort to protect the building against fire. Ostentatious buildings that demonstrated the wealth and power of the feudal lords were constructed, such as the Kamiyashiki of Matsudaira Tadamasa or the Ōzone Shimoyashiki.

Edo suffered badly from devastating fires and the 1657 Great Fire of Meireki was a turning point in urban design. Initially, as a method of reducing fire spread, the government built stone embankments in at least two locations along rivers in the city. Over time these were torn down and replaced with dōzō storehouses that were used both as fire breaks and to store goods unloaded from the canals. The dōzō were built with a structural frame made of timber coated with a number of layers of earthen plaster on the walls, door and roof. Above the earthen roofs was a timber framework supporting a tiled roof. Although Japanese who had studied with the Dutch at their settlement in Dejima advocated building with stone and brick this was not undertaken because of their vulnerability to earthquakes. Machiya and storehouses from the later part of the period are characterised by having a black coloration to the external plaster walls. This colour was made by adding India ink to burnt lime and crushed oyster shell.

The clean lines of the civil architecture in Edo influenced the sukiya style of residential architecture. Katsura Detached Palace and Shugaku-in Imperial Villa on the outskirts of Kyōto are good examples of this style. Their architecture has simple lines and decor and uses wood in its natural state. The sukiya style was applied not only to villas but also to ryōtei (Japanese-style restaurants) and chashitsu, and later it was also applied to residences.

In the very late part of the period sankin-kōtai, the law requiring the daimyōs to maintain dwellings in the capital was repealed which resulted in a decrease in population in Edo and a commensurate reduction in income for the shogunate.

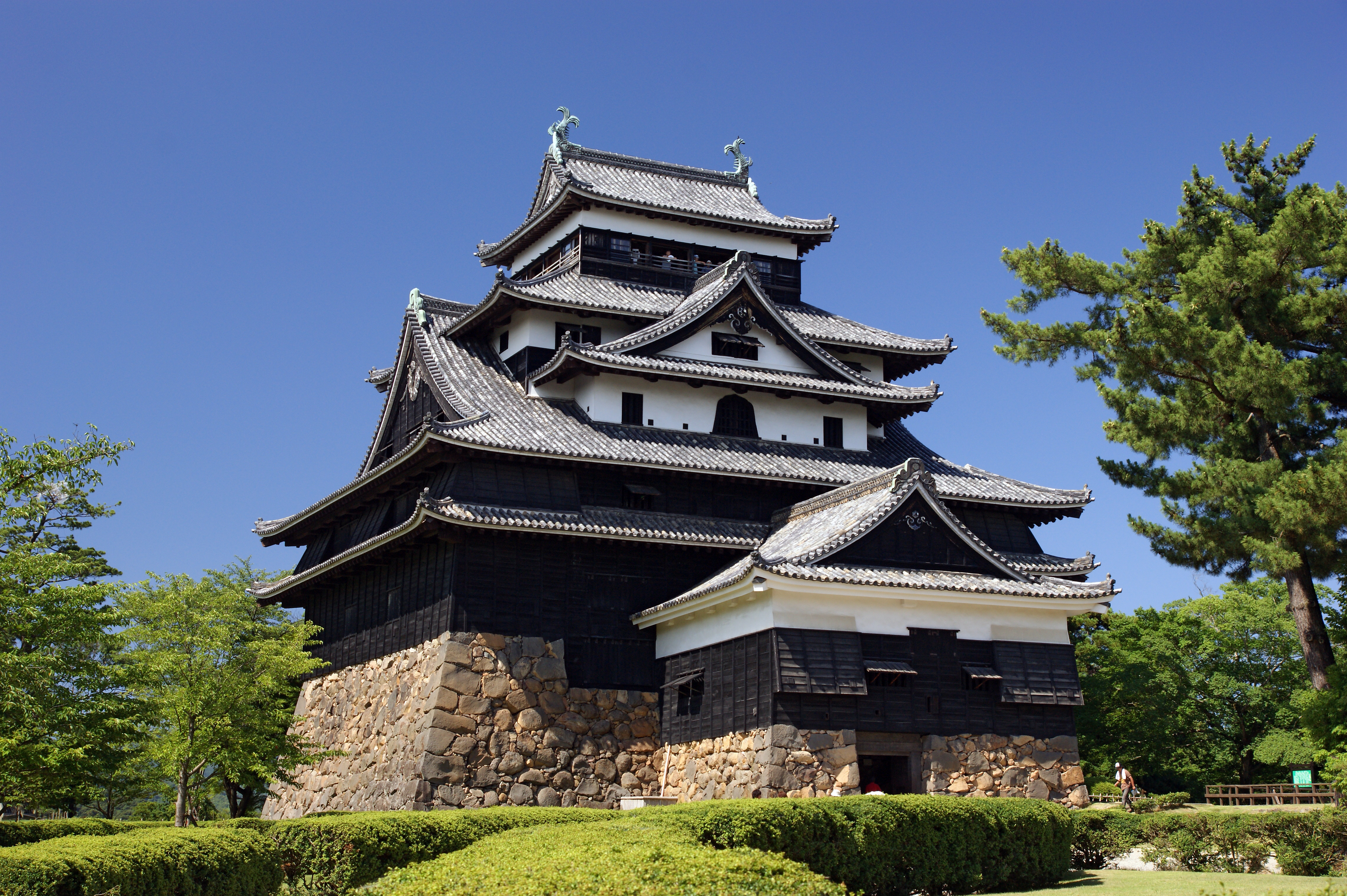
Tenshu of Matsue Castle in Matsue, Shimane Prefecture
Built in 1607

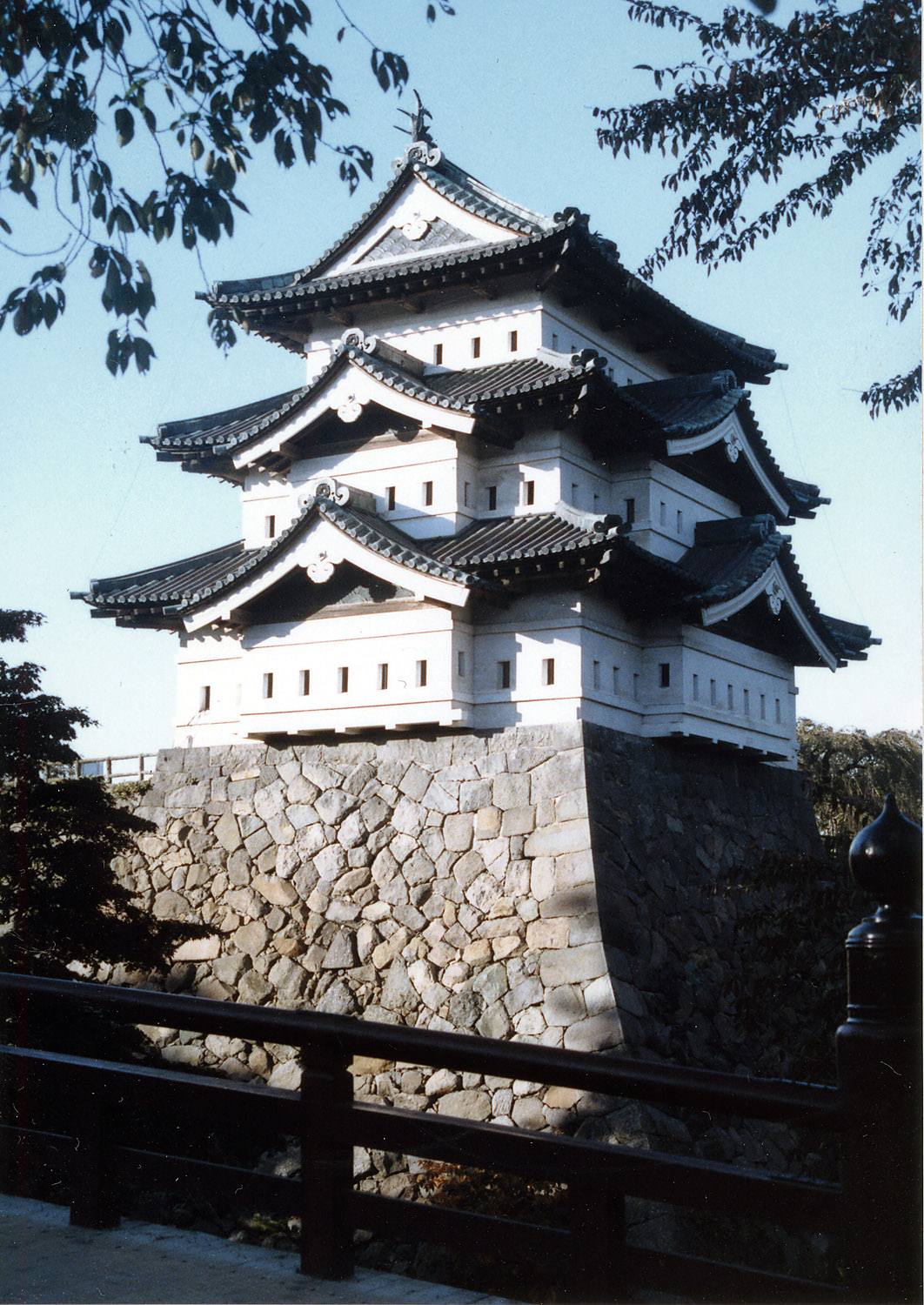
Tenshu of Hirosaki Castle in Hirosaki, Aomori
Completed in 1611

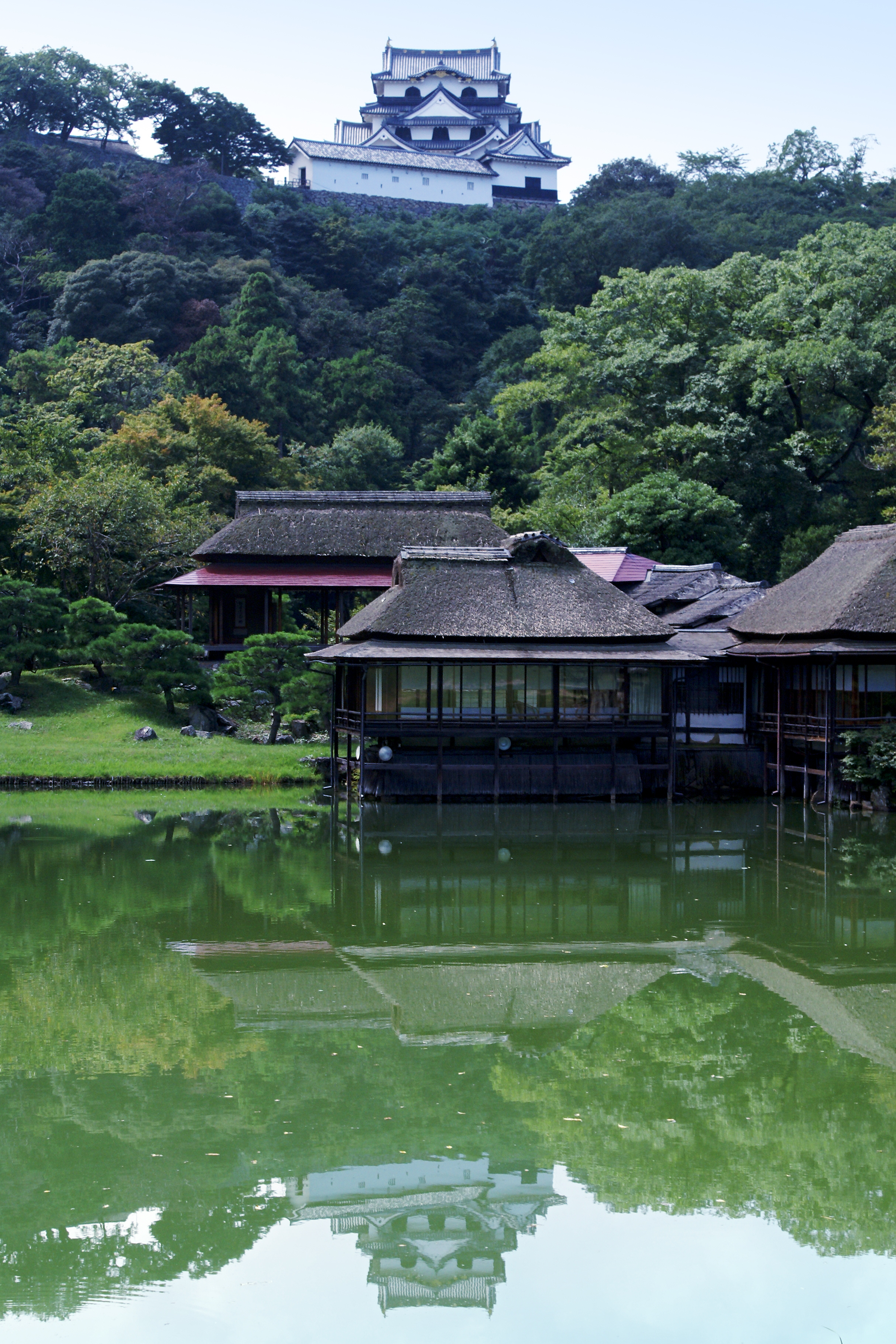
Hikone Castle in Hikone, Shiga
Completed in 1622

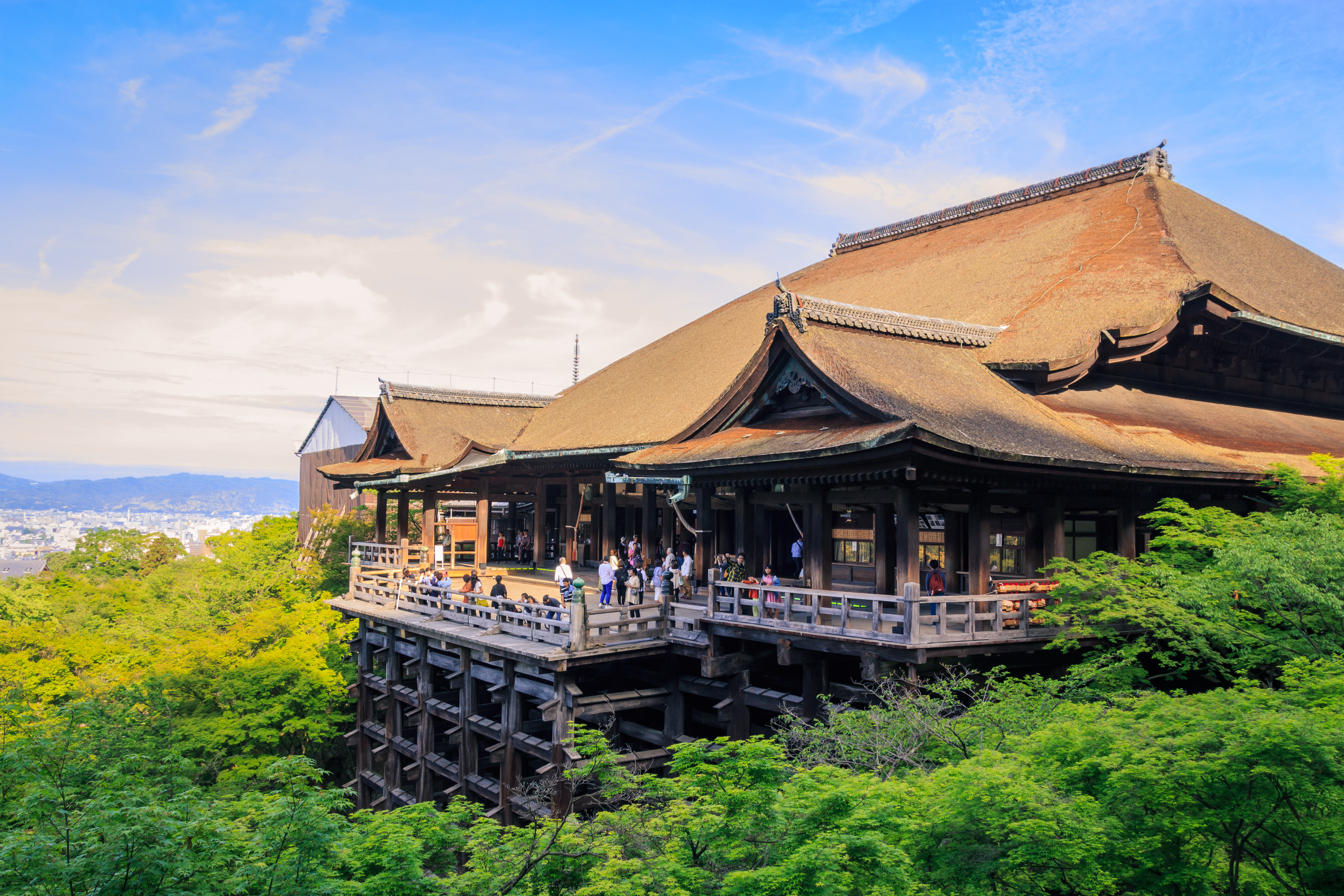
Hondo of Kiyomizu-dera, Kyoto, Built in 1633

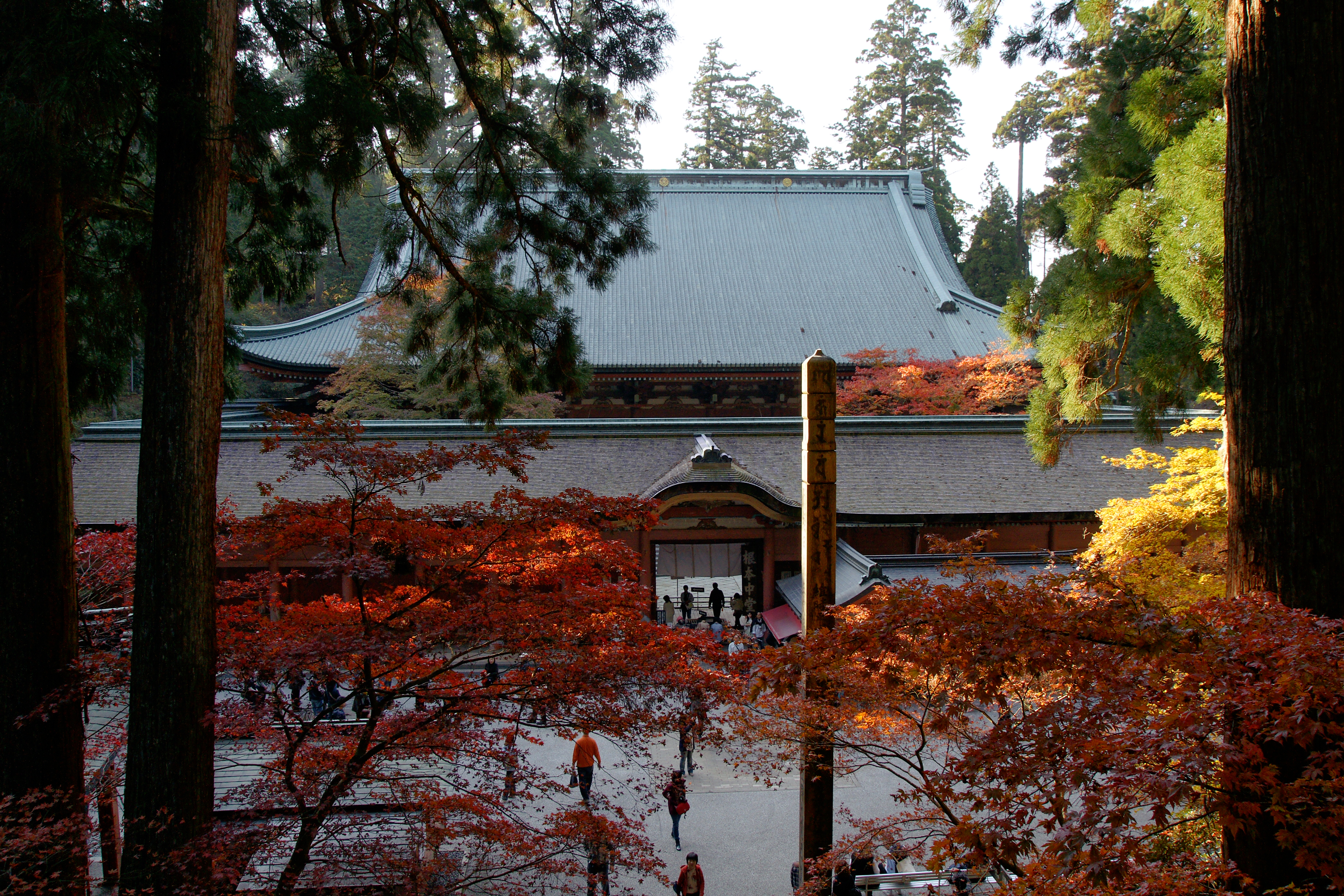
Konponchudo of Enryaku-ji in Ōtsu, Shiga
Built in 1641

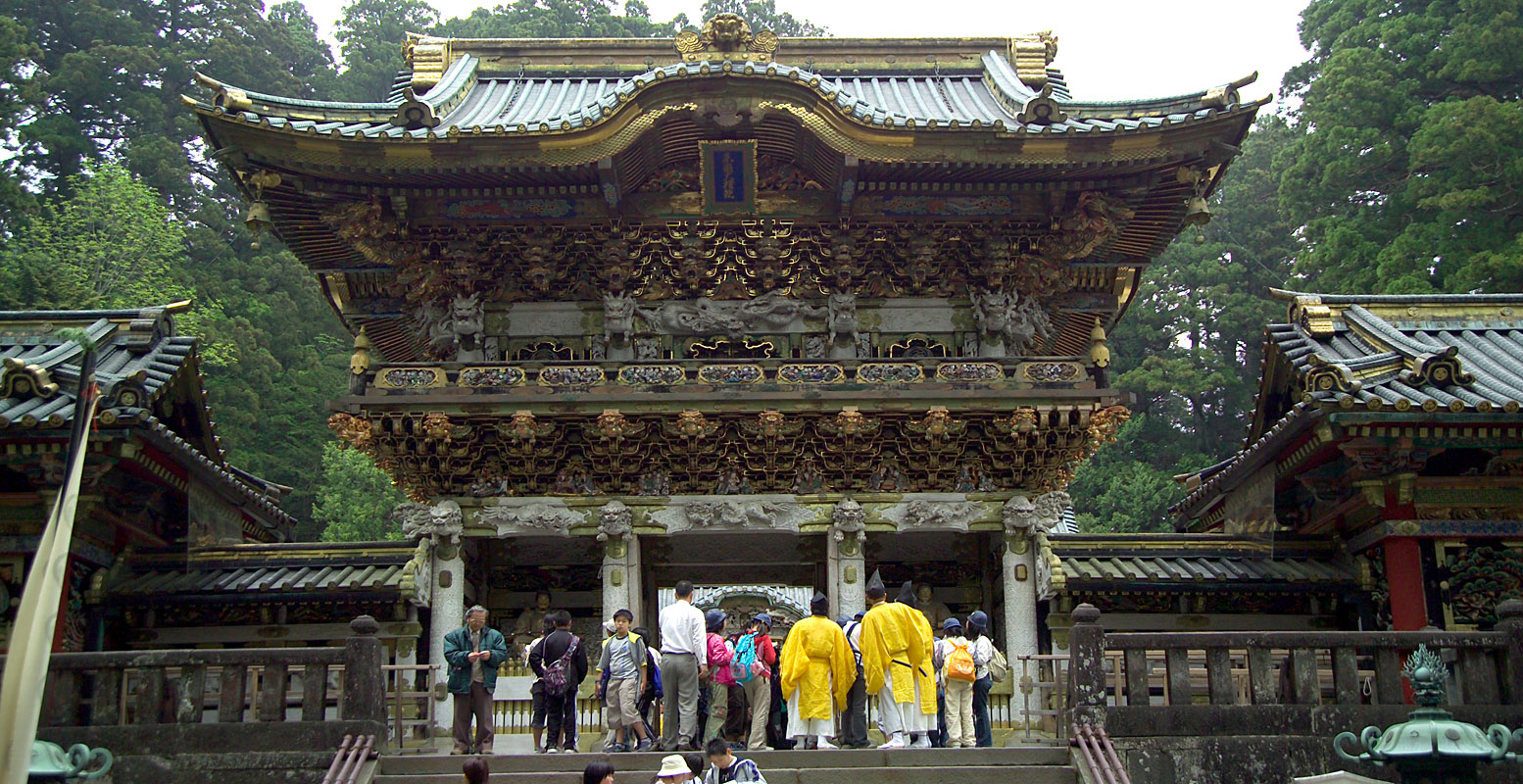
Yomeimon of Tōshō-gū, Nikkō, Tochigi

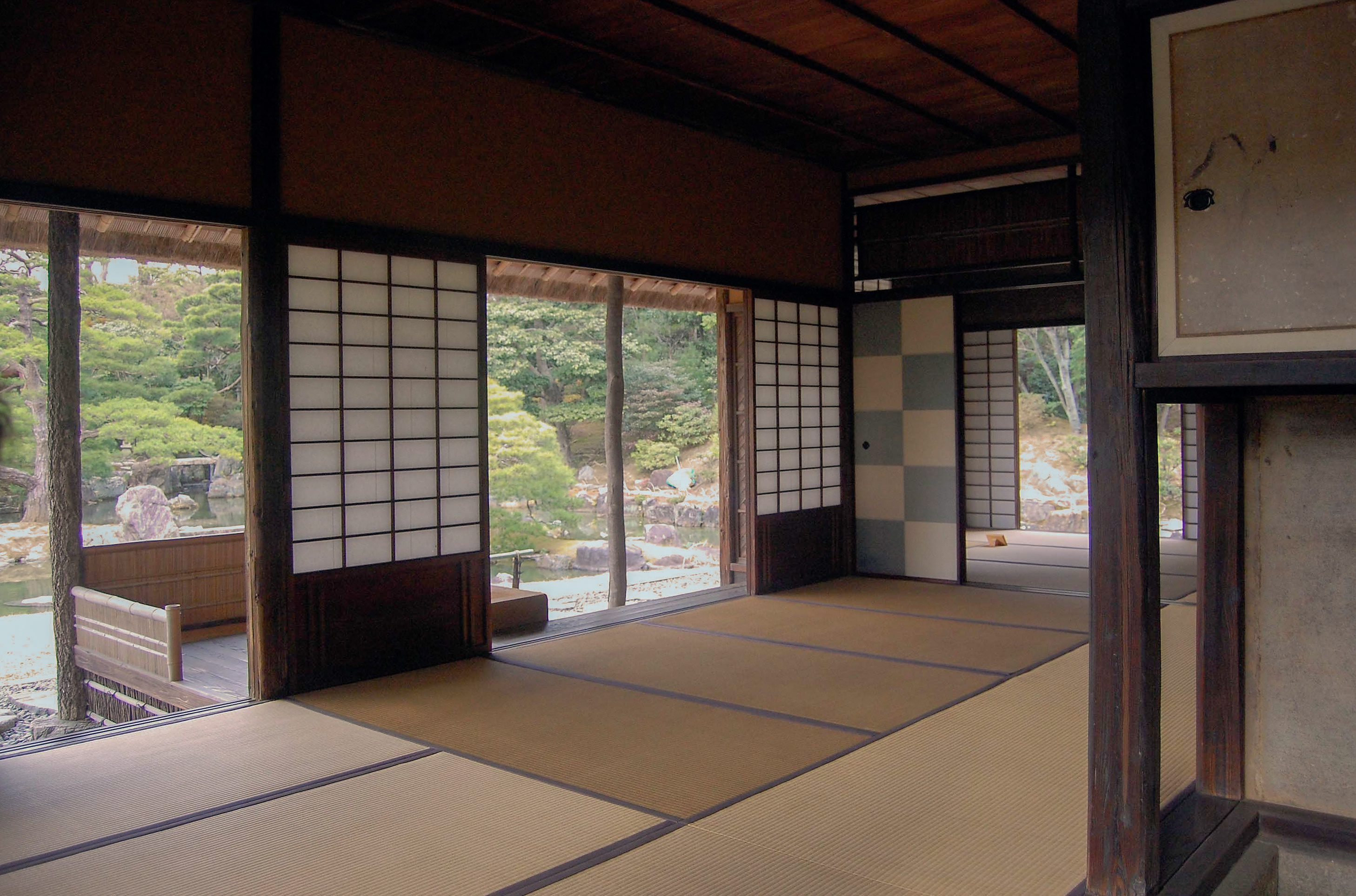
Inside the Shokintei at Katsura Imperial Villa, Kyoto
Built in 17th century

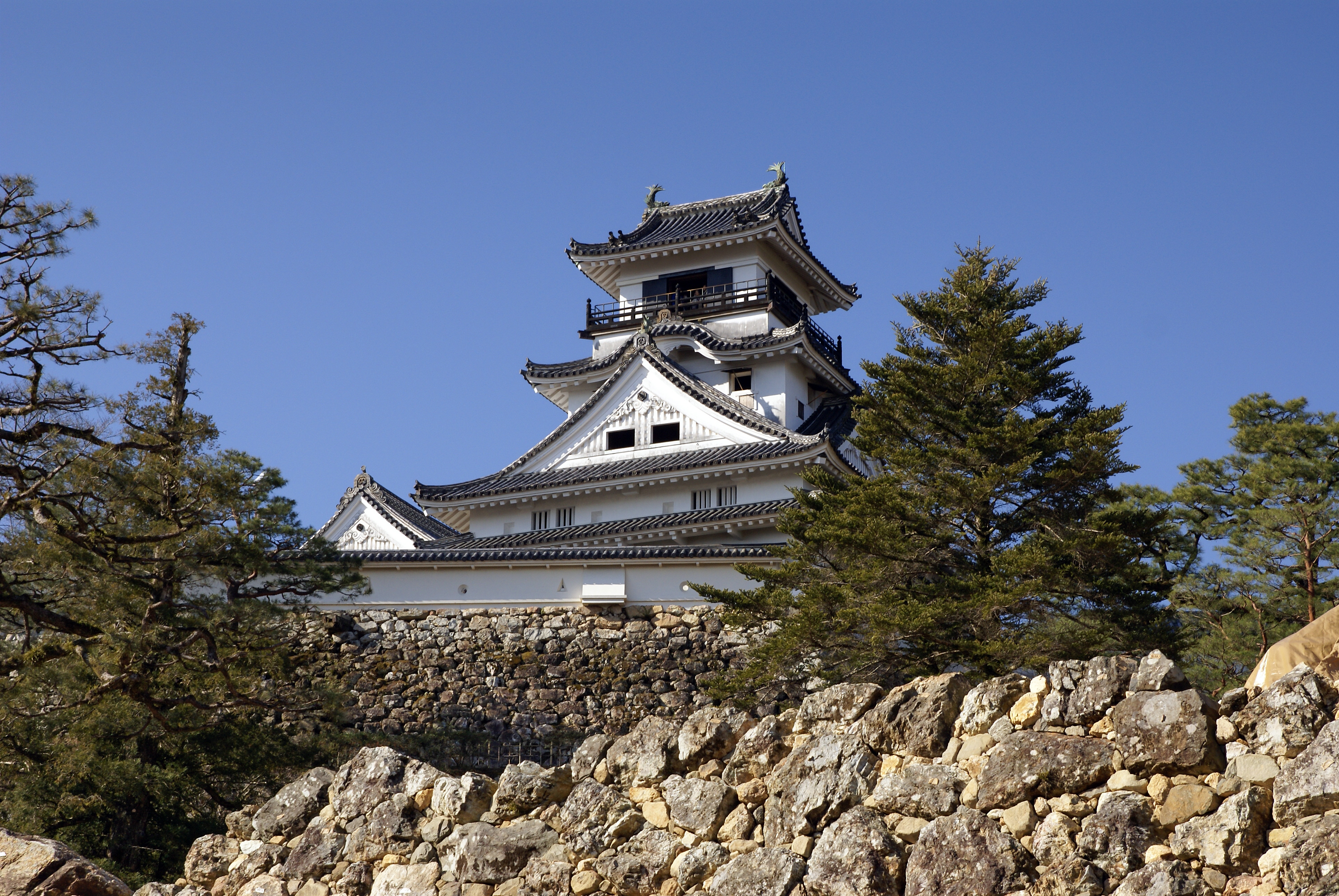
Tenshu of Kōchi Castle in Kōchi, Kōchi Prefecture
Built in 1748

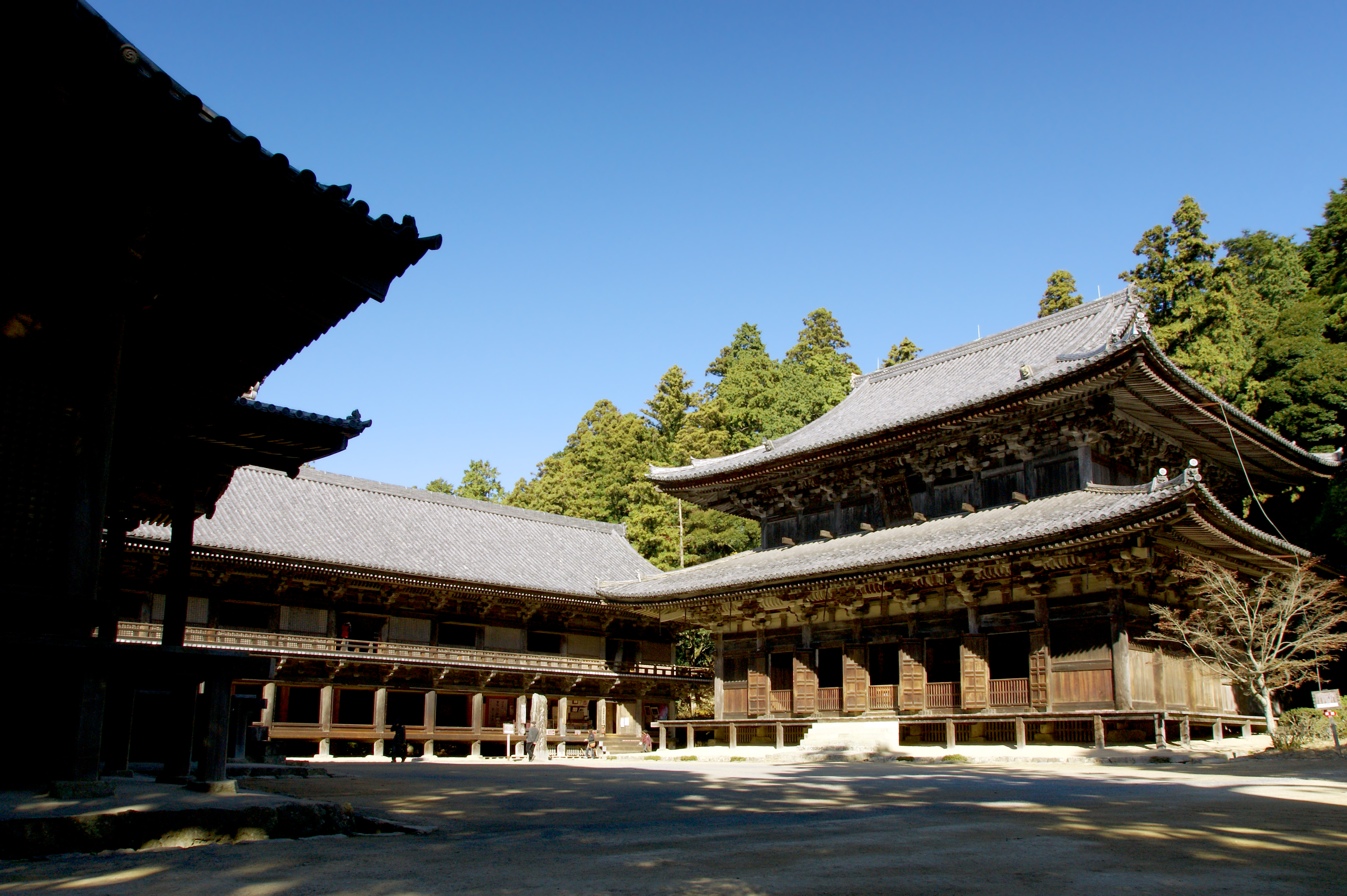
Three halls of Engyō-ji in Himeji, Hyōgo, Completed in 18th century

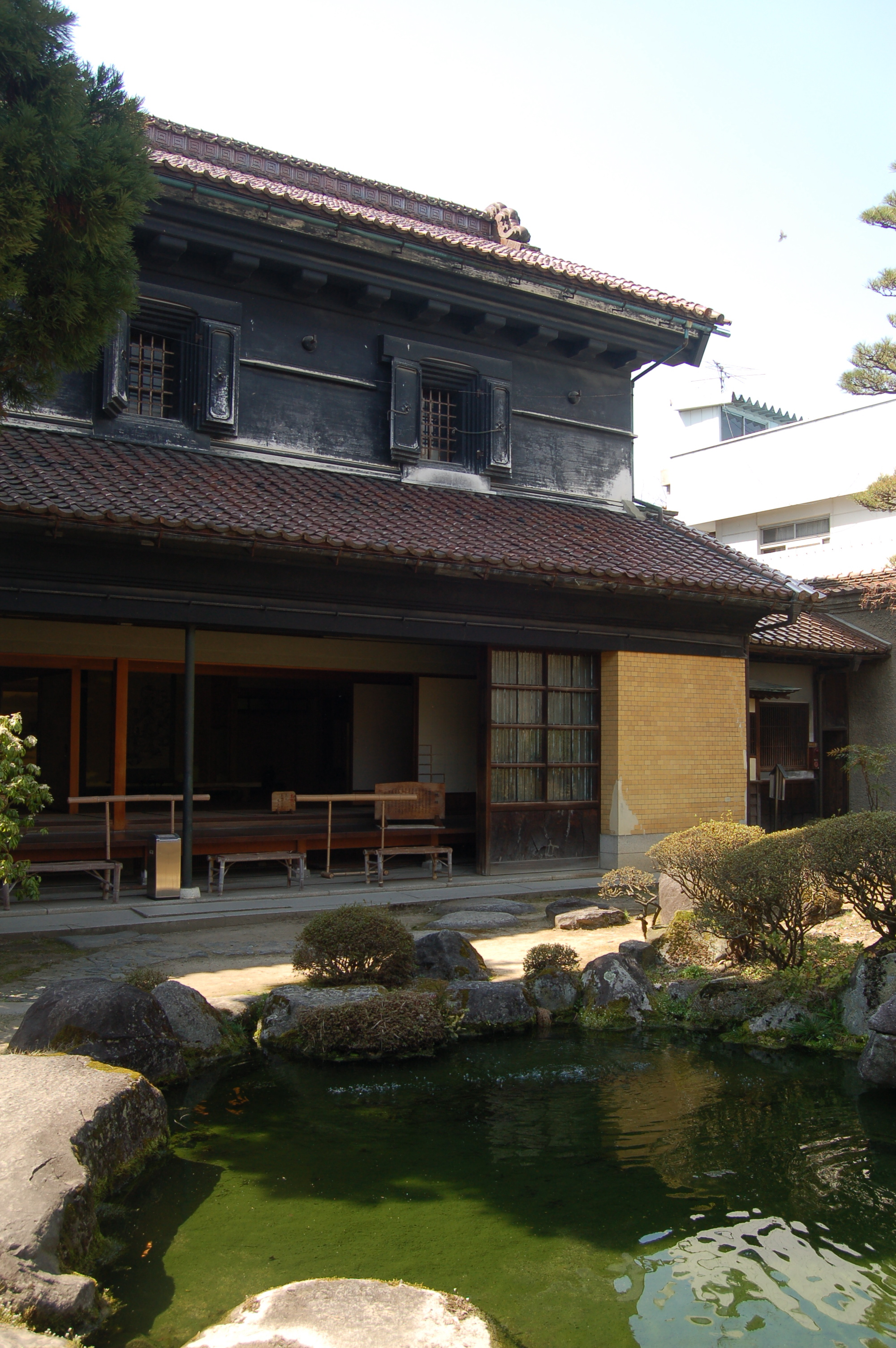
Townhouse with black (edoguro) colouring to upper floor

== Meiji, Taishō, and early Shōwa periods ==
Towards the end of the Tokugawa shogunate, Western influence in architecture began to show in buildings associated with the military and trade, especially naval and industrial facilities. After the Emperor Meiji was restored to power (known as the Meiji Restoration) Japan began a rapid process of Westernization which led to the need for new building types such as schools, banks and hotels. Early Meiji Architecture was initially influenced by colonial architecture in Chinese treaty ports such as Hong Kong. In Nagasaki, the British trader Thomas Glover built his own house in just such a style using the skill of local carpenters. His influence helped the career of architect Thomas Waters who designed the Osaka Mint in 1868, a long, low building in brick and stone with a central pedimented portico. In Tōkyō, Waters designed the Commercial Museum, thought to have been the city's first brick building.

In Tokyo, after the Tsukiji area burnt to the ground in 1872, the government designated the Ginza area as model of modernization. The government planned the construction of fireproof brick buildings, and larger, better streets connecting the Shimbashi Station and the foreign concession in Tsukiji, as well as to important government buildings. Designs for the area were provided by the British architect Thomas James Waters; the Bureau of Construction of the Ministry of Finance was in charge of construction. In the following year, a Western-style Ginza was completed. "Bricktown" buildings were initially offered for sale, later they were leased, but the high rent meant that many remained unoccupied. Nevertheless, the area flourished as a symbol of "civilization and enlightenment", thanks to the presence of newspapers and magazine companies, who led the trends of the day. The area was also known for its window displays, an example of modern marketing techniques. The "Bricktown" of Ginza served as a model for many other modernization schemes in Japanese cities.

Rokumeikan in 1883–1900

One of the prime examples of early western architecture was the Rokumeikan, a large two-story building in Tokyo, completed in 1883, which was to become a controversial symbol of Westernisation in the Meiji period. Commissioned for the housing of foreign guests by the Foreign Minister Inoue Kaoru, it was designed by Josiah Conder, a prominent foreign government advisors in Meiji Japan (o-yatoi gaikokujin). The Ryōunkaku was Japan's first western-style skyscraper, constructed in 1890 in Asakusa. However traditional architecture was still employed for new buildings, such as the Kyūden of Tokyo Imperial Palace, albeit with token western elements such as a spouting water fountain in the gardens.

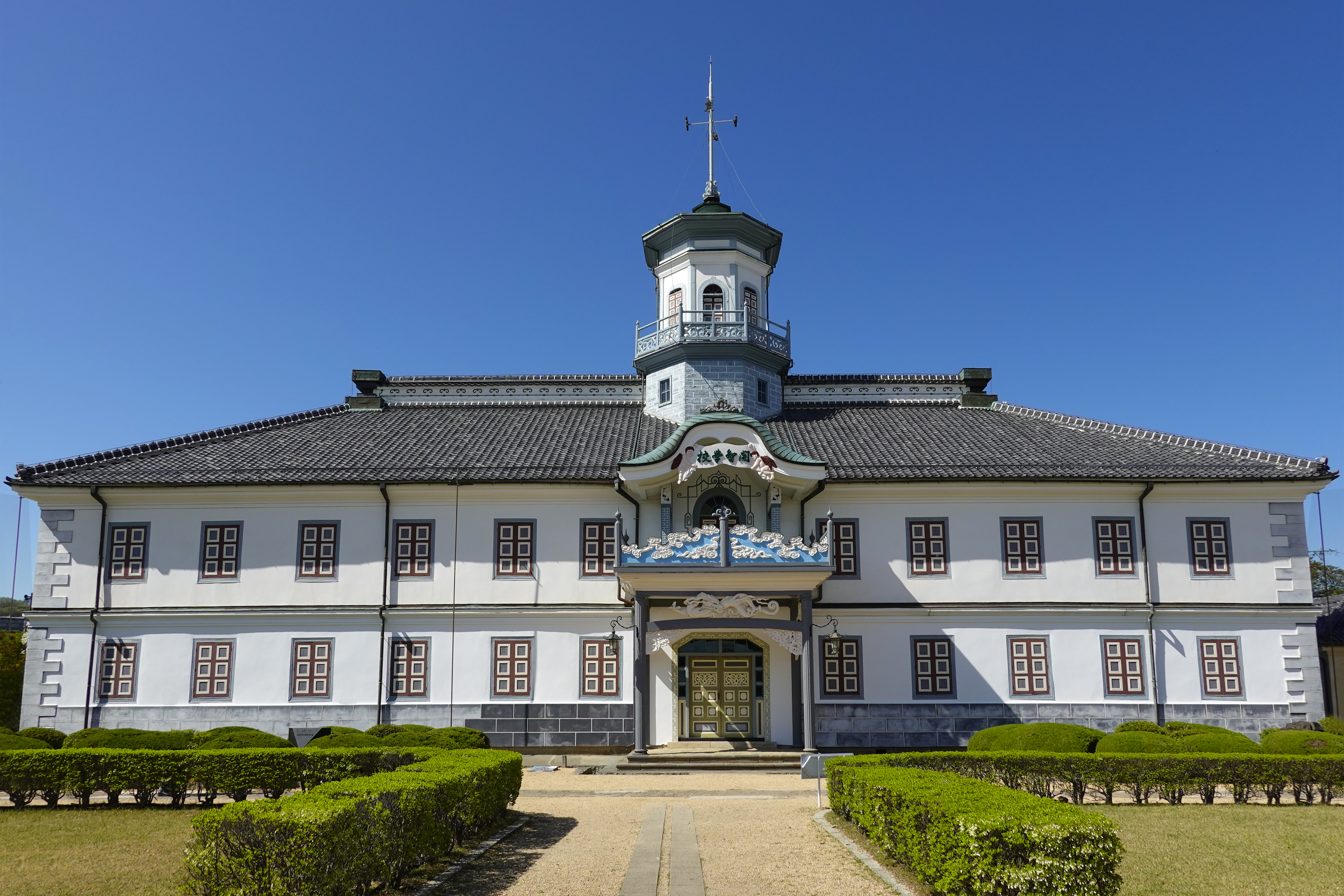
Kaichi Primary School, Matsumoto, built in 1876

In contrast to Waters's neoclassical style building, Japanese carpenters developed a pseudo-Japanese style known as giyōfū chiefly using wood. A good example of which is Kaichi Primary School in Nagano Prefecture built in 1876. The master carpenter Tateishi Kiyoshige travelled to Tōkyō to see which Western building styles were popular and incorporated these in the school with traditional building methods. Constructed with a similar method to traditional (kura (倉)) storehouses, the wooden building plastered inside and out incorporates an octagonal Chinese tower and has stone-like quoins to the corners. Traditional namako plasterwork was used at the base of the walls to give the impression that the building sits on a stone base. Another example was the First National Bank building in Tokyo, built in 1872.

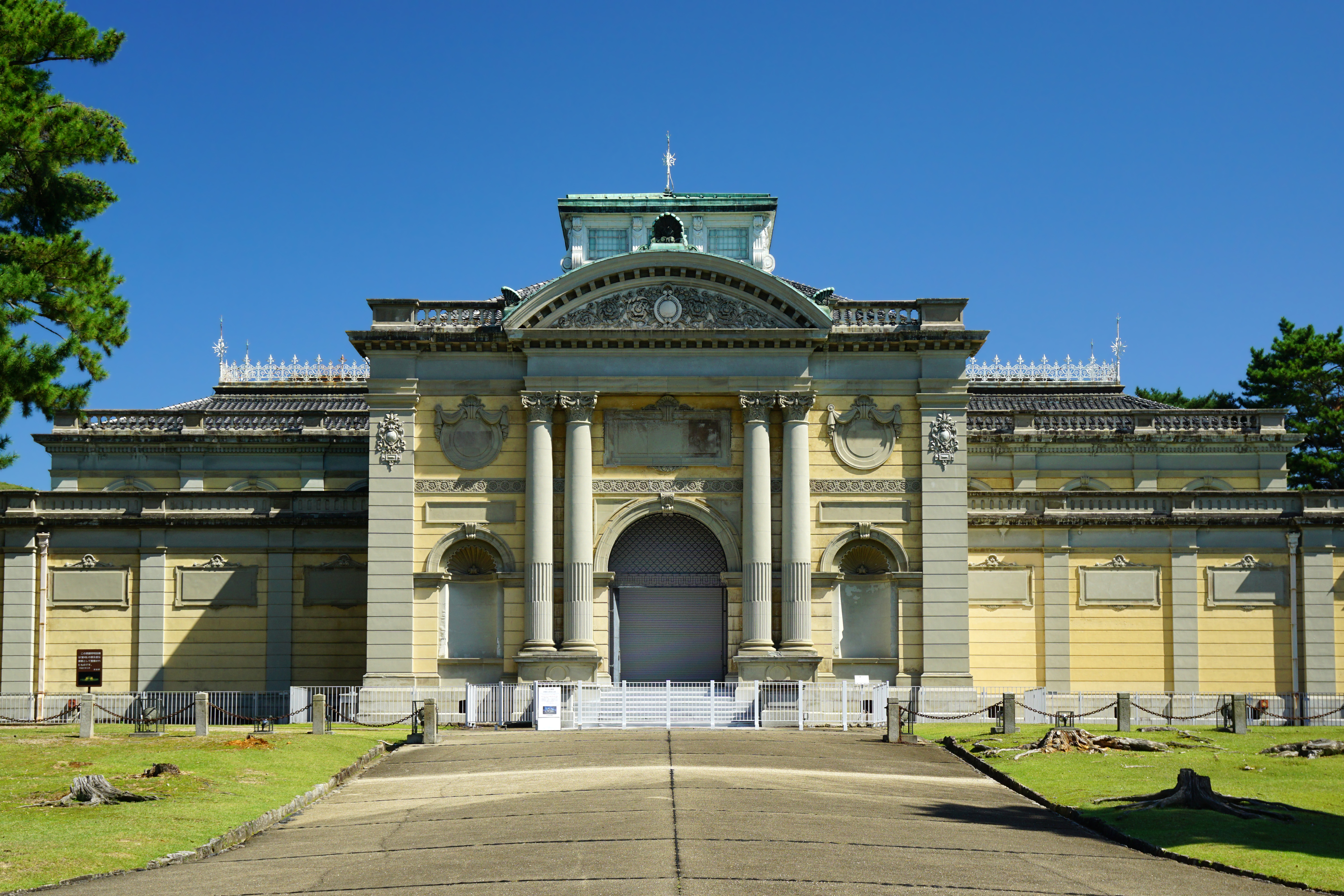
Nara National Museum in Nara, Tōkuma Katayama, built in 1894

The Japanese government also invited foreign architects to both work in Japan and teach new Japanese architects. One of these, the British architect Josiah Conder went on to train many of the most prominent of the Japanese Meiji era architects, including Kingo Tatsuno, Tatsuzō Sone and Tokuma Katayama. Tatsuno's early works had a Venetian style influenced by John Ruskin, but his later works such as the Bank of Japan (1896) and Tōkyō Station (1914) have a more Beaux-Arts feel. On the other hand, Katayama was more influenced by the French Second Empire style which can be seen in the Nara National Museum (1894) and the Kyōto National Museum (1895).

In 1920, a group of young architects formed the first organization of modernist architects. They were known as the Bunriha, literally "Secessionist group", inspired in part by the Vienna Secessionists. These architects were worried about the reliance on historical styles and decoration and instead encouraged artistic expression. They drew their influence from European movements like Expressionism and the Bauhaus and helped pave the way towards the introduction of the International Style of Modernism.

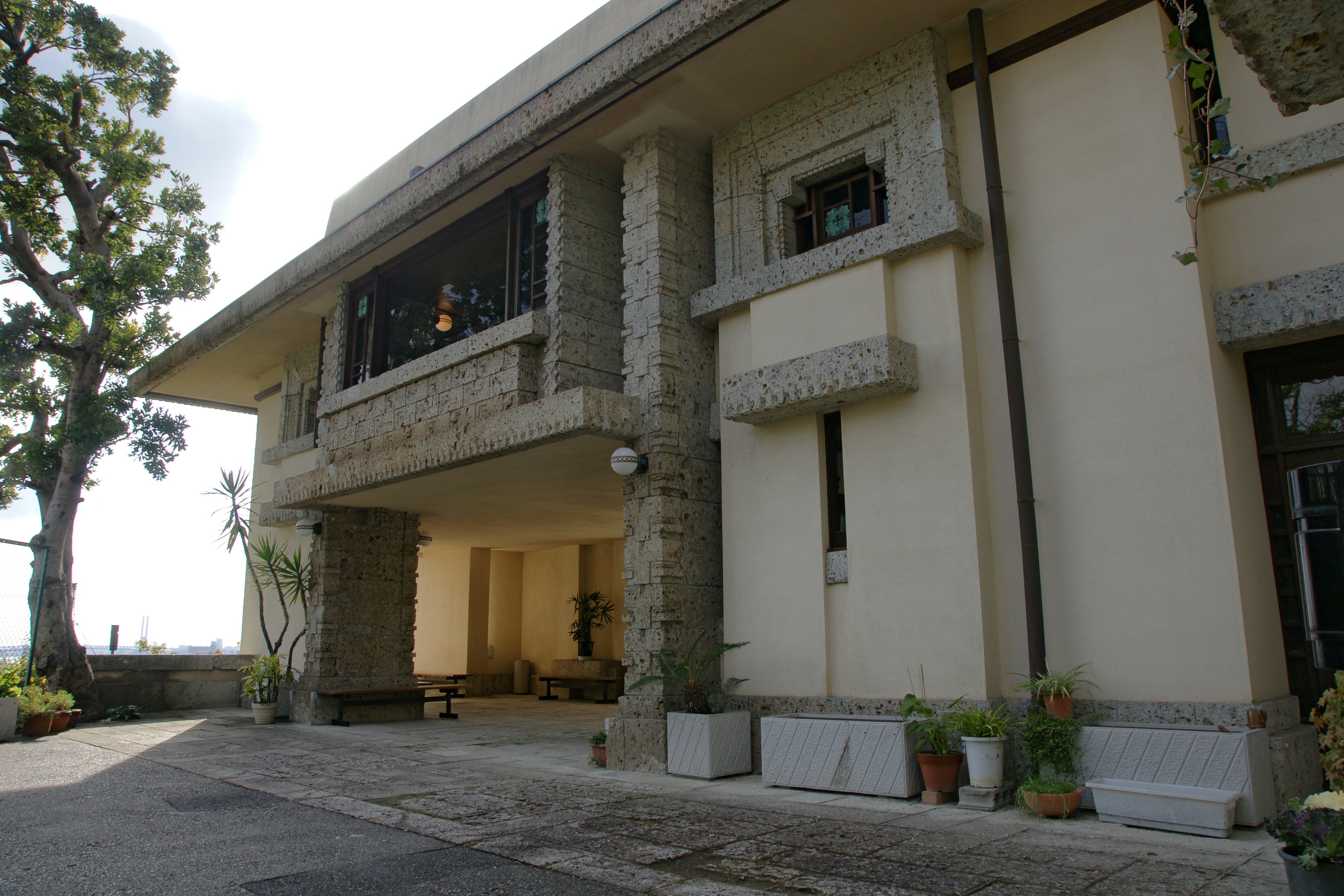
Yamamura House, Ashiya, Frank Lloyd Wright, built in 1924

In the Taishō and early Shōwa periods two influential American architects worked in Japan. The first was Frank Lloyd Wright who designed the Imperial Hotel, Tokyo (1913–1923) and the Yodokō Guest House (1924), both of which used locally quarried Ōya stone. Wright had a number of Japanese apprentices under his tutelage, such as Arata Endo, who constructed the Kōshien Hotel in 1930.

The second was Antonin Raymond who worked for Wright on the Imperial Hotel before leaving to set up his own practice in Tōkyō. Although his early works like Tōkyō Women's Christian College show Wright's influence, he soon began to experiment with the use of in-situ reinforced concrete, detailing it in way that recalled traditional Japanese construction methods. Between 1933 and 1937 Bruno Taut stayed in Japan. His writings, especially those on Katsura Imperial Villa reevaluated traditional Japanese architecture whilst bringing it to a wider audience.

As in the Meiji era experience from abroad was gained by Japanese architects working in Europe. Among these were Kunio Maekawa and Junzo Sakakura who worked at Le Corbusier's atelier in Paris and Bunzō Yamaguchi and Chikatada Kurata who worked with Walter Gropius.

Some architects built their reputation upon works of public architecture. Togo Murano, a contemporary of Raymond, was influenced by Rationalism and designed the Morigo Shoten office building, Tōkyō (1931) and Ube Public Hall, Yamaguchi Prefecture (1937). Similarly, Tetsuro Yoshida's rationalist modern architecture included the Tōkyō Central Post Office (1931) and Ōsaka Central Post Office (1939).

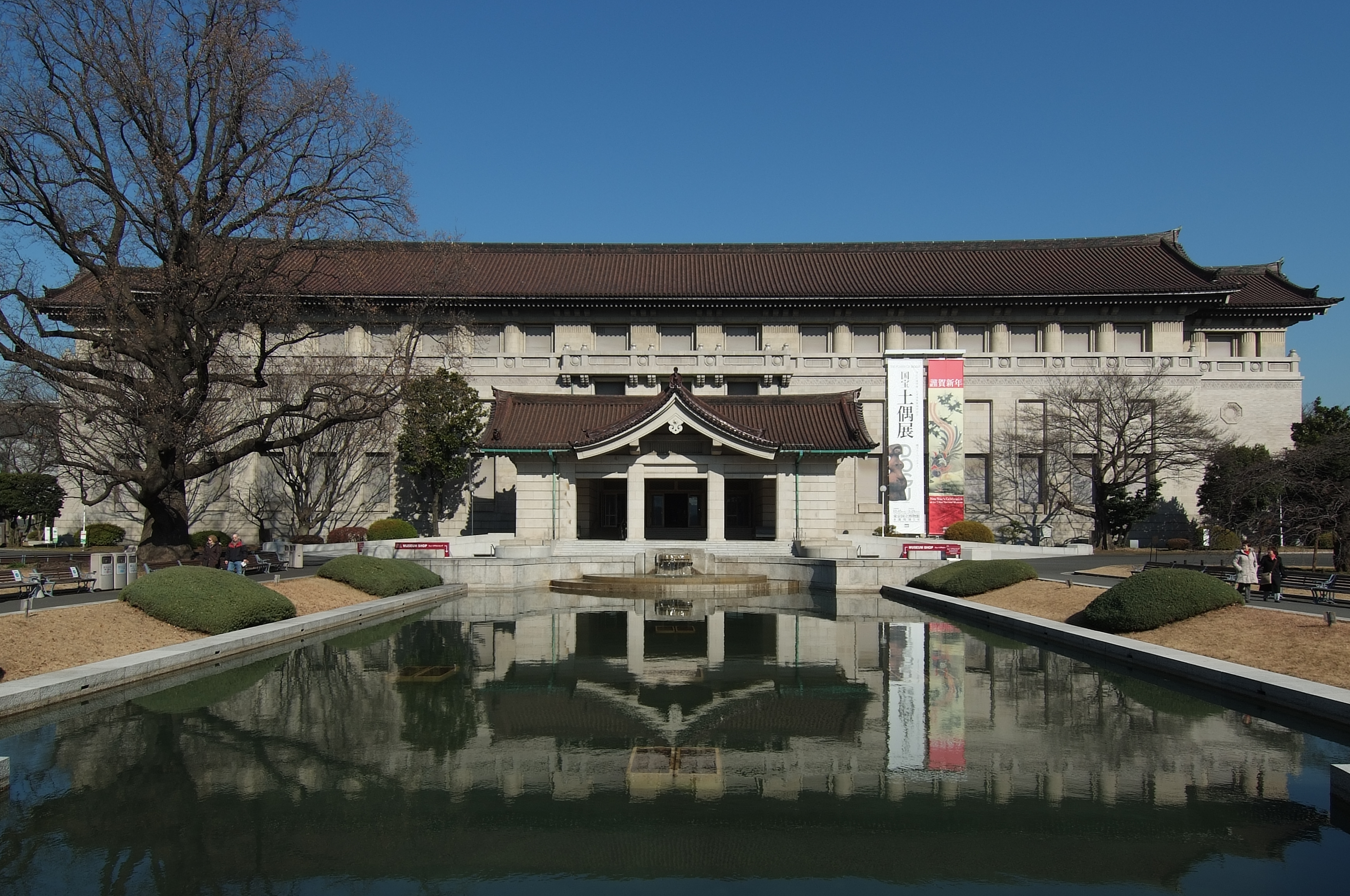
Main building of Tokyo National Museum, built in 1937

Running contrary to modernism in Japan was the so-called Imperial Crown style (teikan yōshiki). Buildings in this style were characterised by having a Japanese-style roof such as the Tōkyō Imperial Museum (1937) by Hitoshi Watanabe and Nagoya City Hall and the Aichi Prefectural Government Office. The increasingly militaristic government insisted that major buildings be designed in a "Japanese Style" limiting opportunities for modernist design to works of infrastructure such as Bunzō Yamaguchi's Number 2 Power Plant for the Kurobe Dam, (1938).

A large number of buildings from the Meiji, Taishō and Shōwa eras were lost during and after World War II, such as the Rokumeikan. Taniguchi Yoshirō (谷口 吉郎, 1904–79), an architect, and Moto Tsuchikawa established Meiji Mura in 1965, close to Nagoya, where a large number of rescued buildings are re-assembled. A similar museum is the Edo-Tokyo Open Air Architectural Museum.

=== Colonial architecture ===
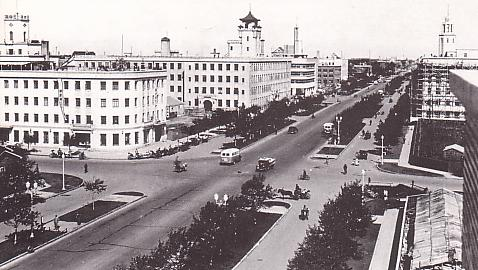
Datong Avenue in Shinkyō (Xinjing), Manchukuo (1939)

The colonial authorities constructed a large number of public buildings, many of which have survived. Examples include the large-scale concept of what is today Ketagalan Boulevard in central Zhongzheng District of Taipei that showcases the Office of the Governor-General, Taiwan Governor Museum, National Taiwan University Hospital, Taipei Guest House, Judicial Yuan, the Nippon Kangyo Bank and Mitsui Bussan Company buildings, as well as many examples of smaller houses found on Qidong Street.

In Korea under Japanese administration, public buildings such as train stations and city halls were also constructed in various styles. Although the largest Japanese colonial building, the immense Government-General Building, was demolished in 1995, many colonial buildings have been preserved. These include the former Keijo City Hall, today Seoul Metropolitan Library; the former Keijo station, today Old Seoul Station; the former Bank of Chosen, designed by Tatsuno Kingo, today the headquarters of the Bank of Korea; and the former branch of Mitsukoshi department store, today the flagship of Shinsegae department store.

After winning Dalian as the result of the Russo-Japanese War of 1904–05, Japan continued to build the Russian-built city with the modern buildings on "Large Square". With the conquest and establishment of the puppet state Manchukuo, massive funds and efforts were invested into the master plan for the construction of the capital city of Shinkyō (Xinjing). Many official buildings erected during the colonial period still stand today, including those of the Eight Grand Ministries of Manchukuo, the Imperial Palace, the headquarters of the Kwantung Army and Datong Avenue.

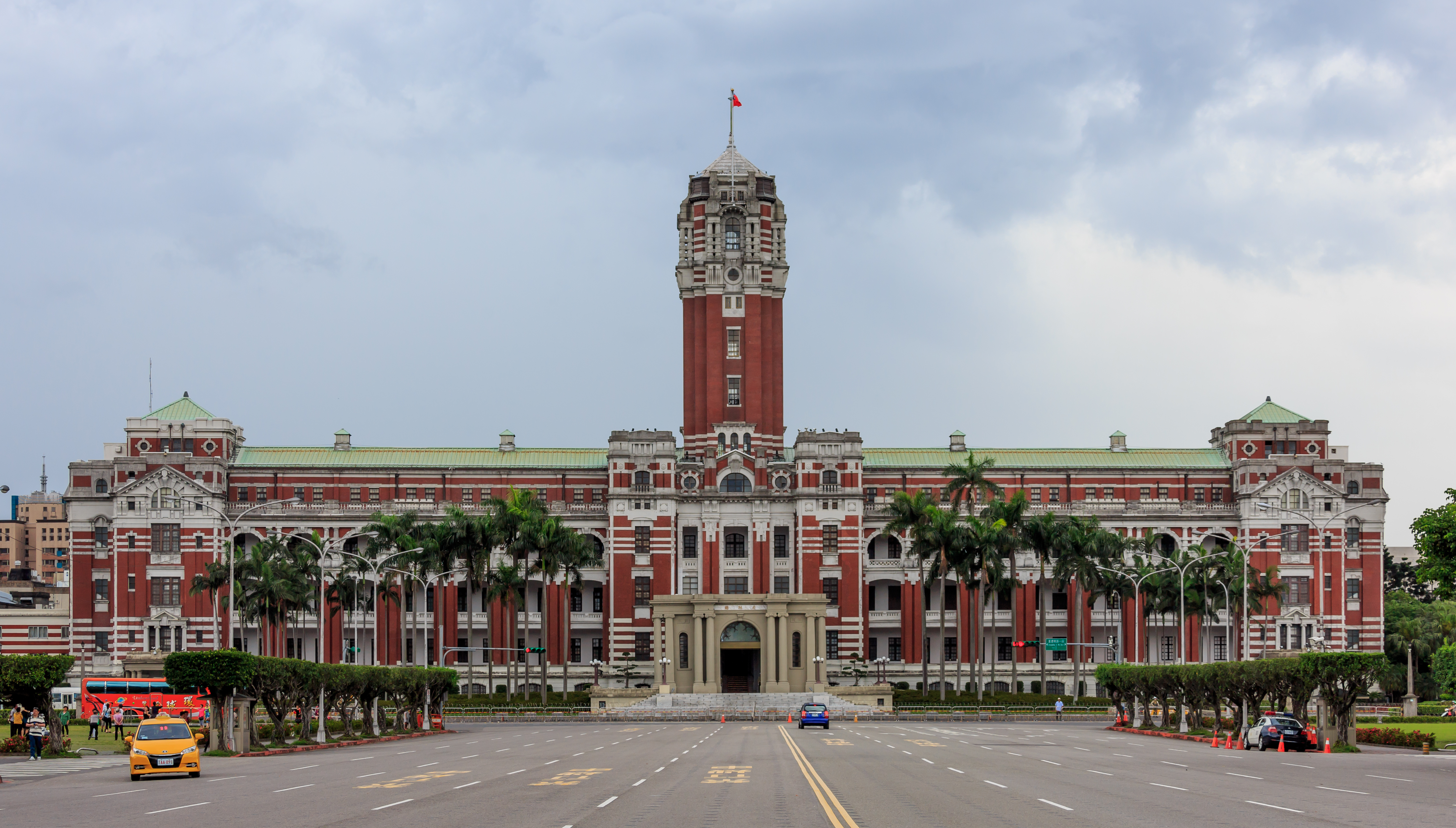
Presidential Office Building in Taipei, built in 1919

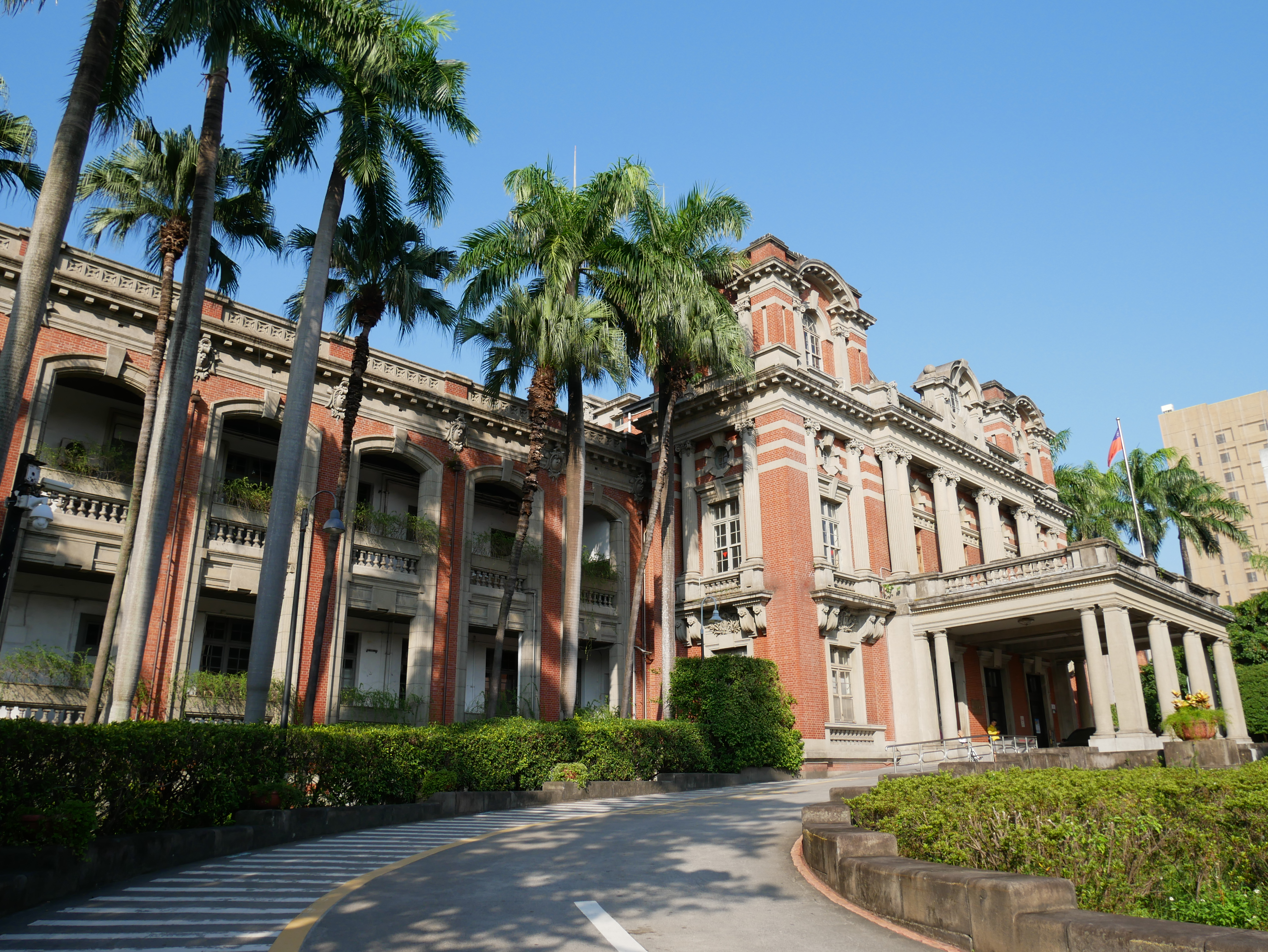
National Taiwan University Hospital in Taipei, built in 1921

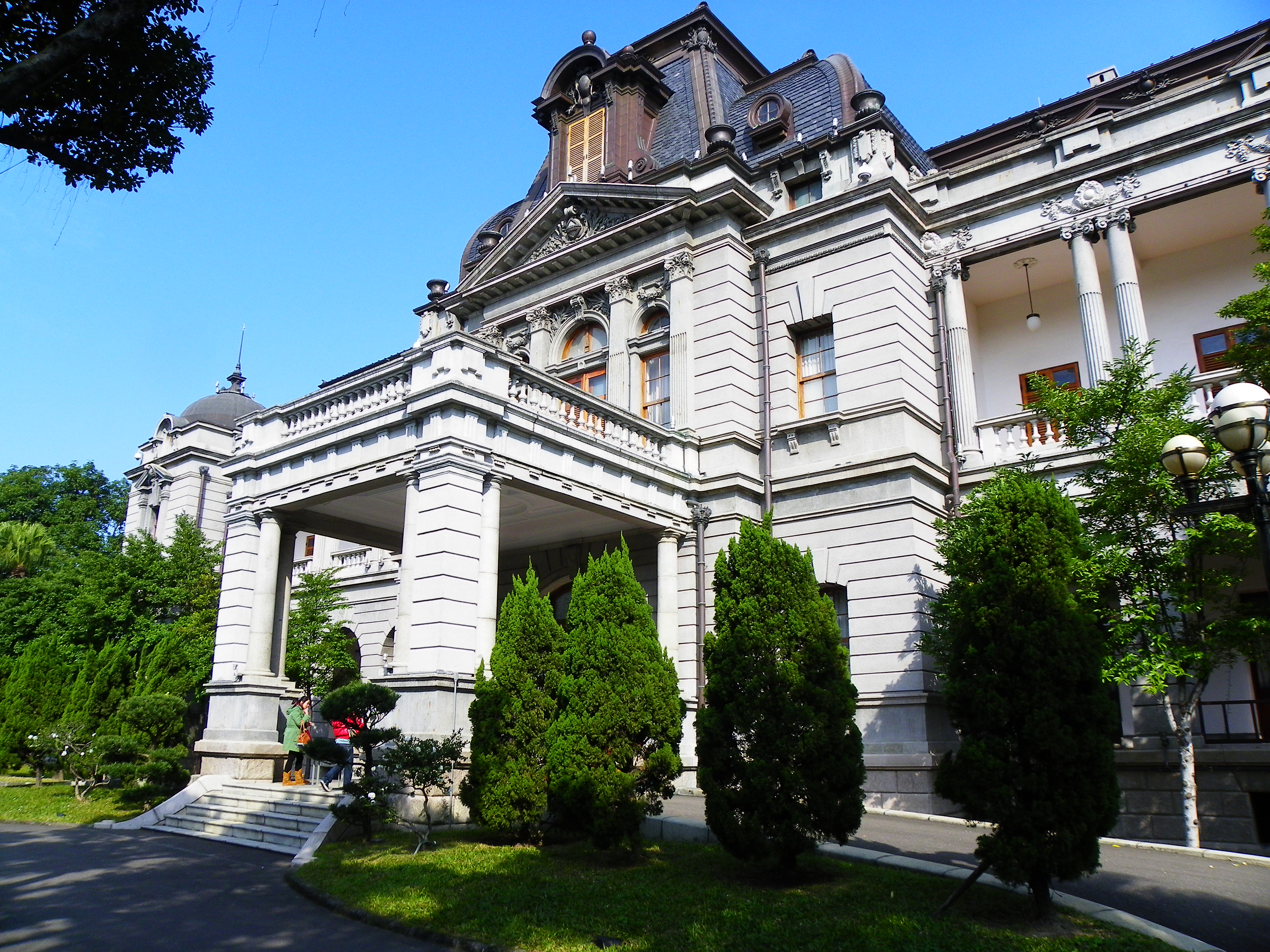
Taipei Guest House in Taipei, built in 1901

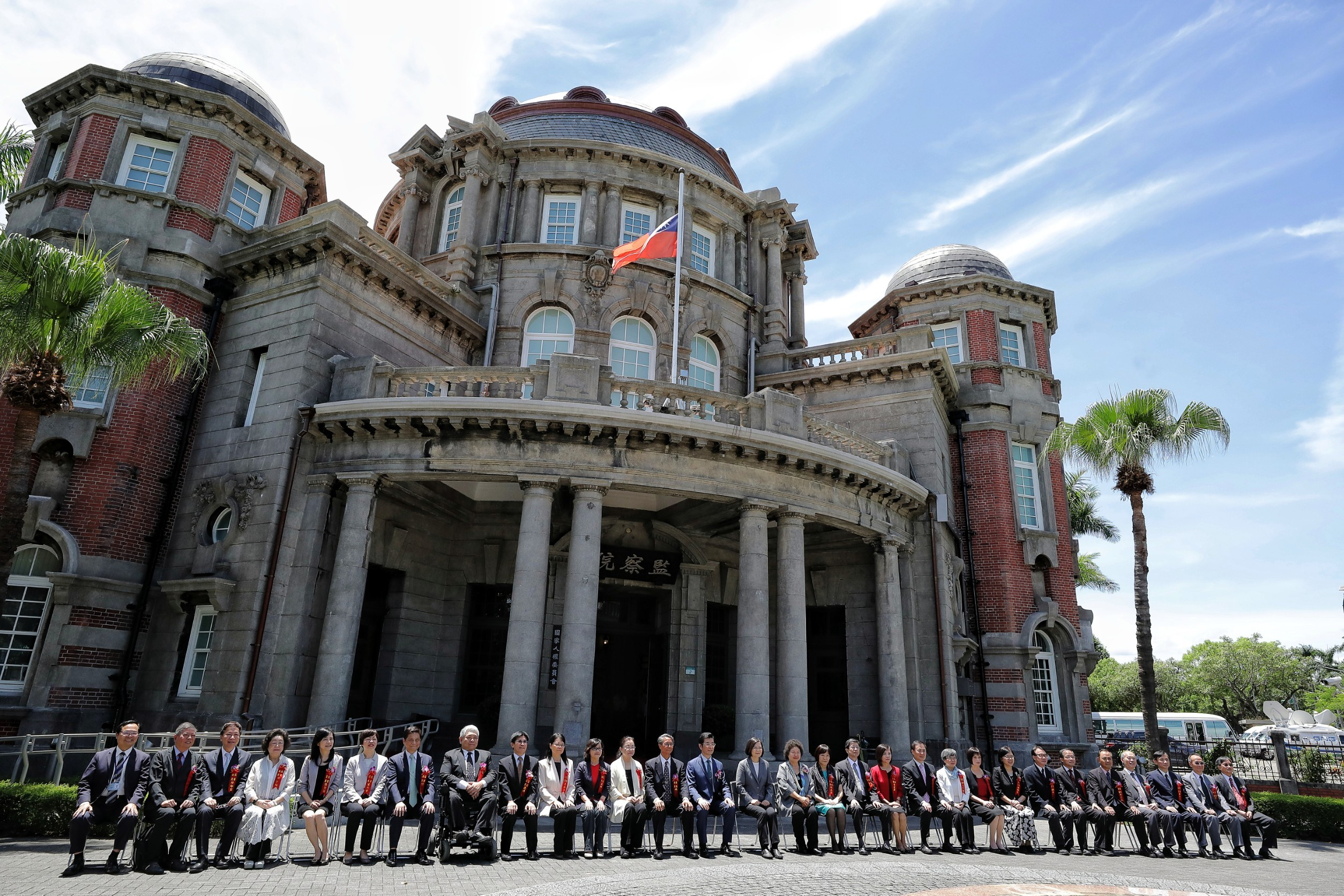
Control Yuan Building in Taipei, built in 1915

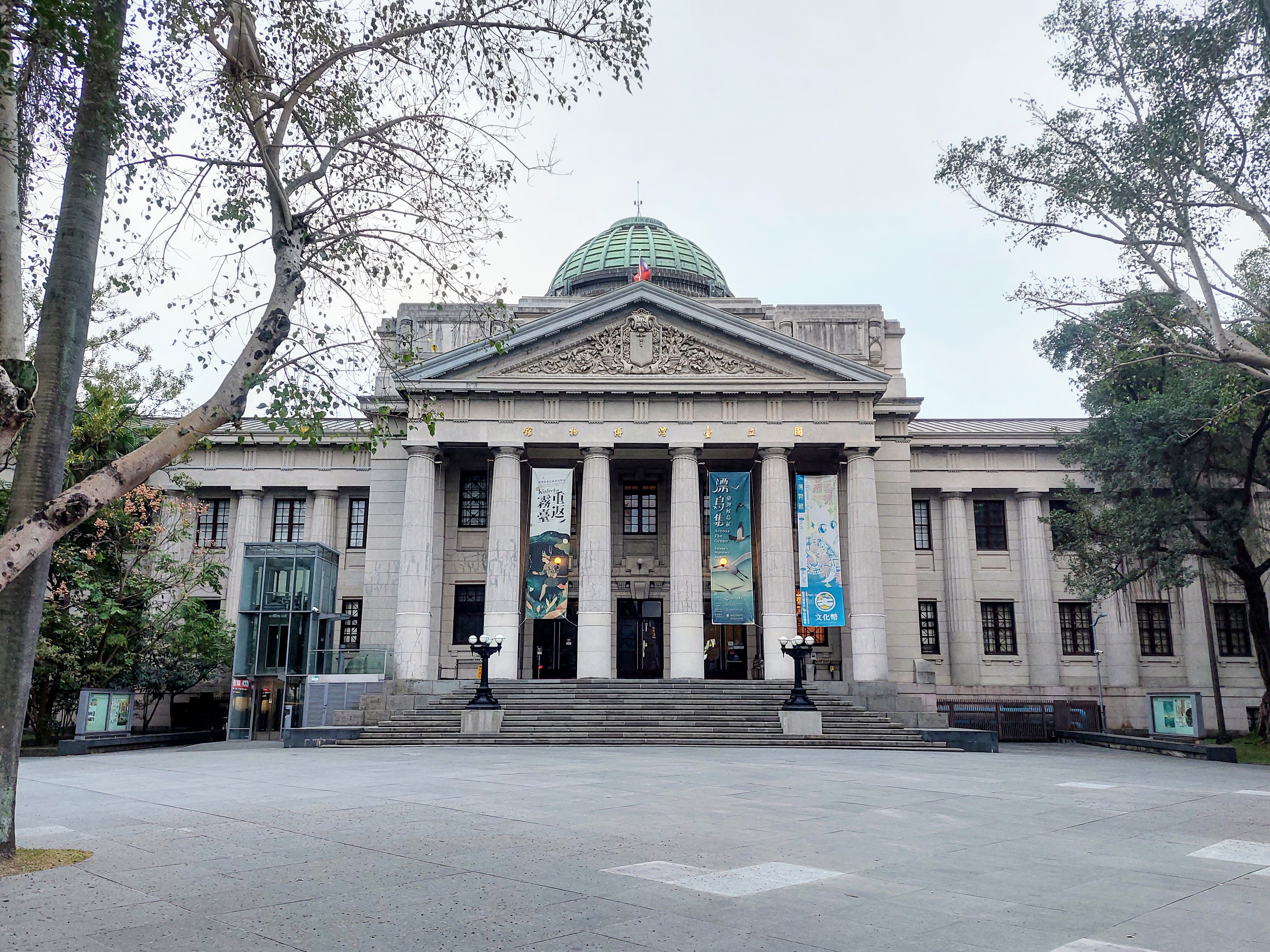
National Taiwan Museum Building in Taipei, built in 1915

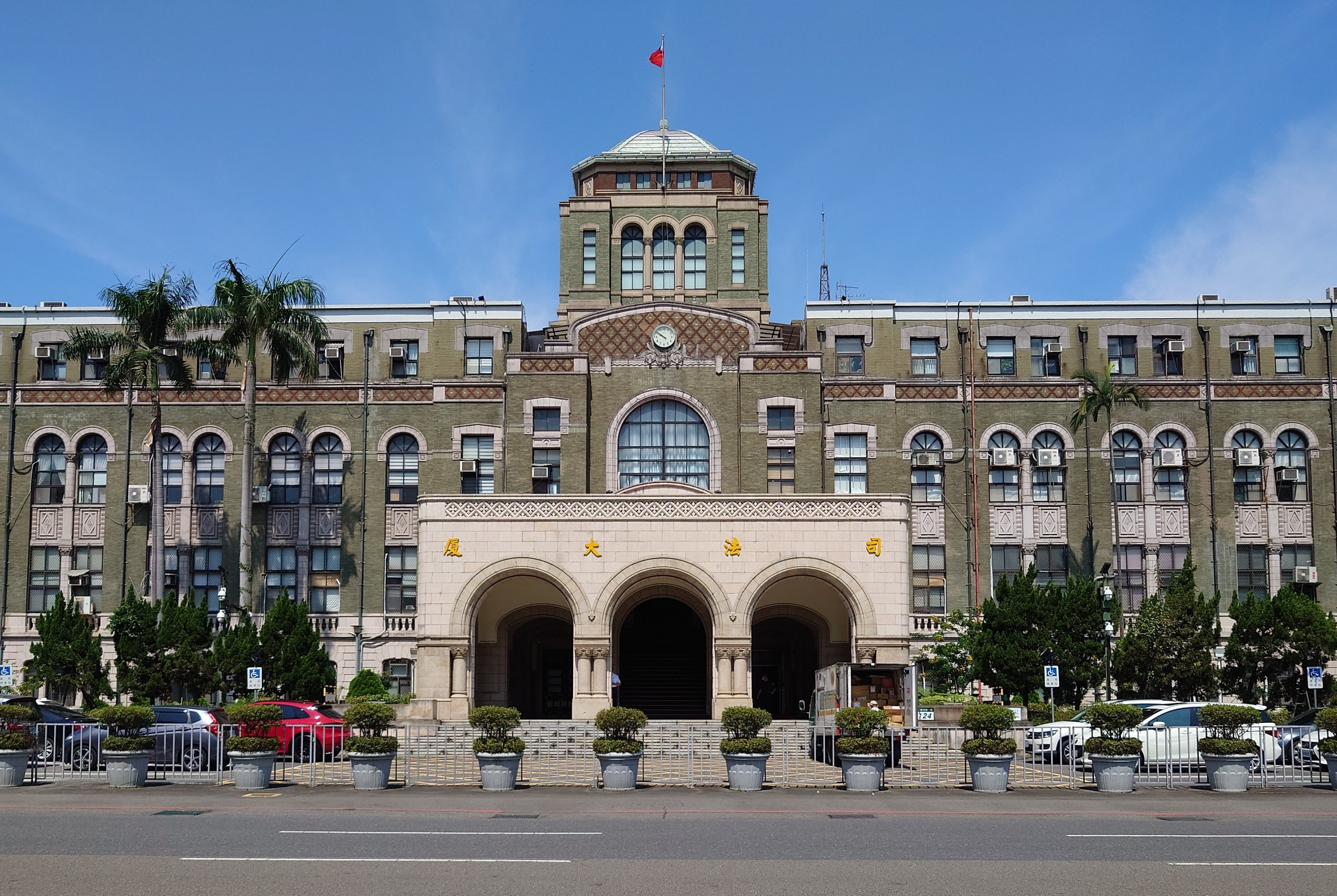
Judicial Yuan Building in Taipei, built in 1934

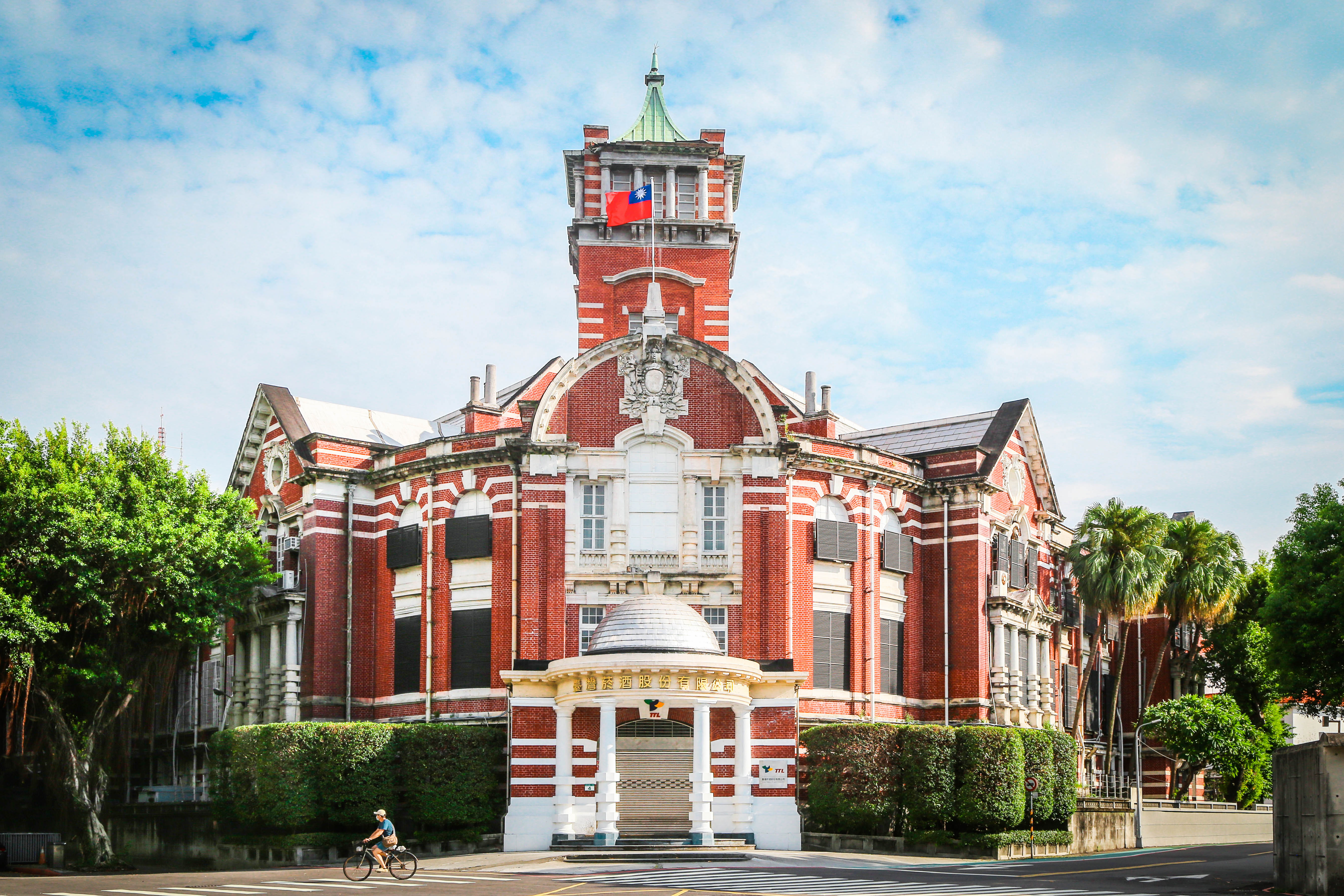
Monopoly Bureau Building in Taipei, built in 1915

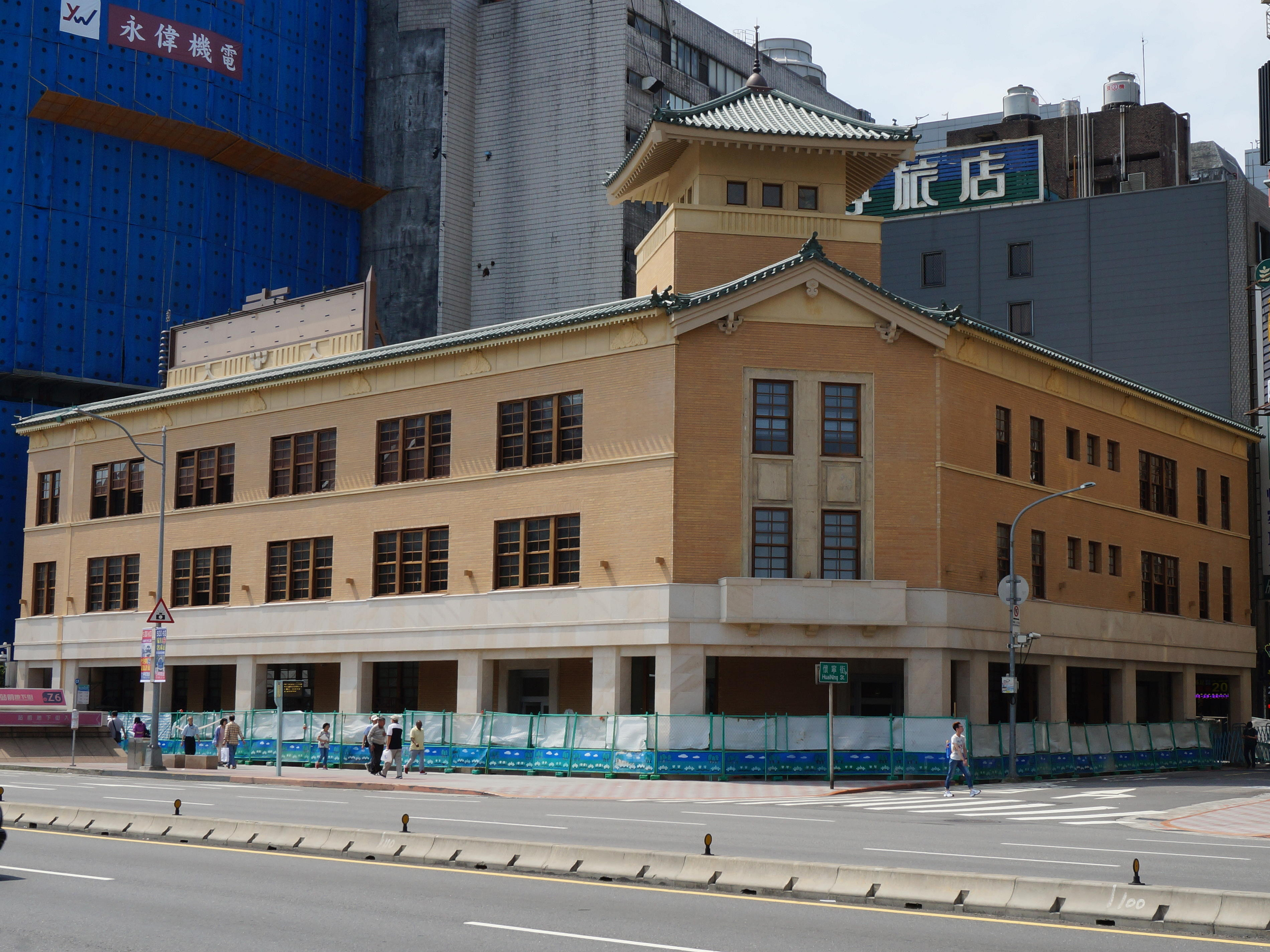
Former Osaka Shosen (now Mitsui O.S.K. Lines) Office Building in Taipei, built in 1937

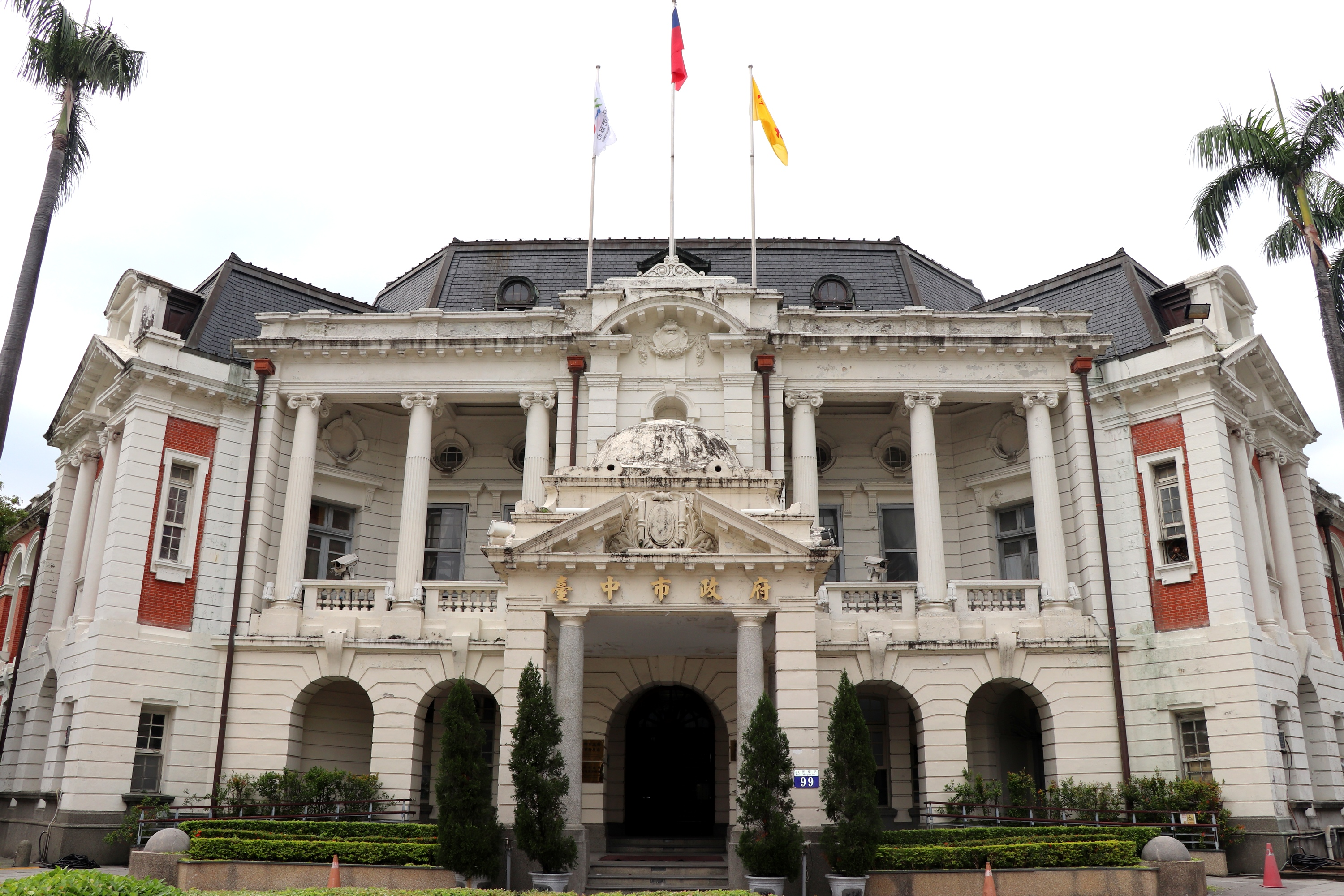
Taichung Prefectural Hall in Taichung, built in 1913

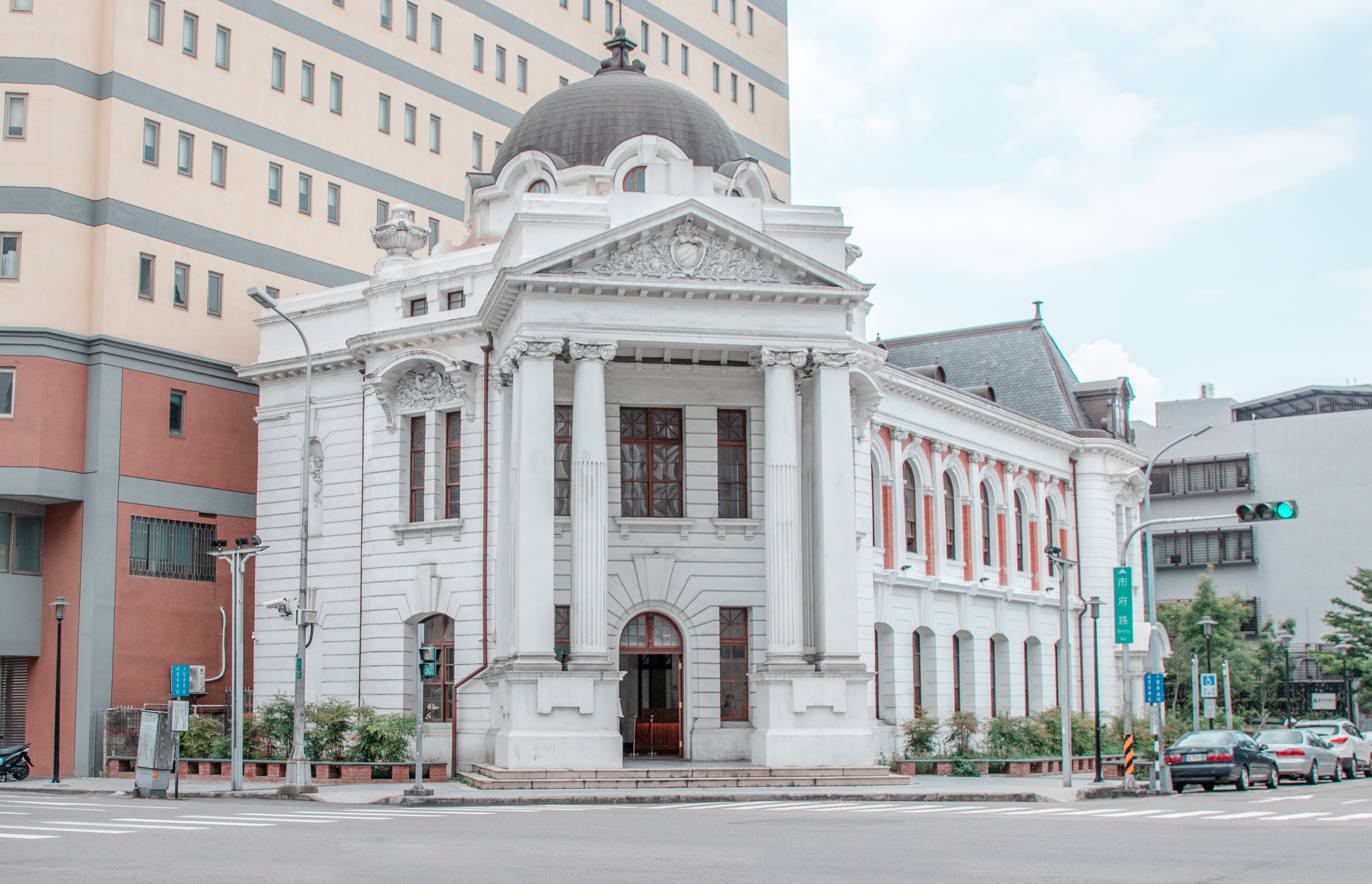
Taichung Shiyakusho in Taichung, built in 1911

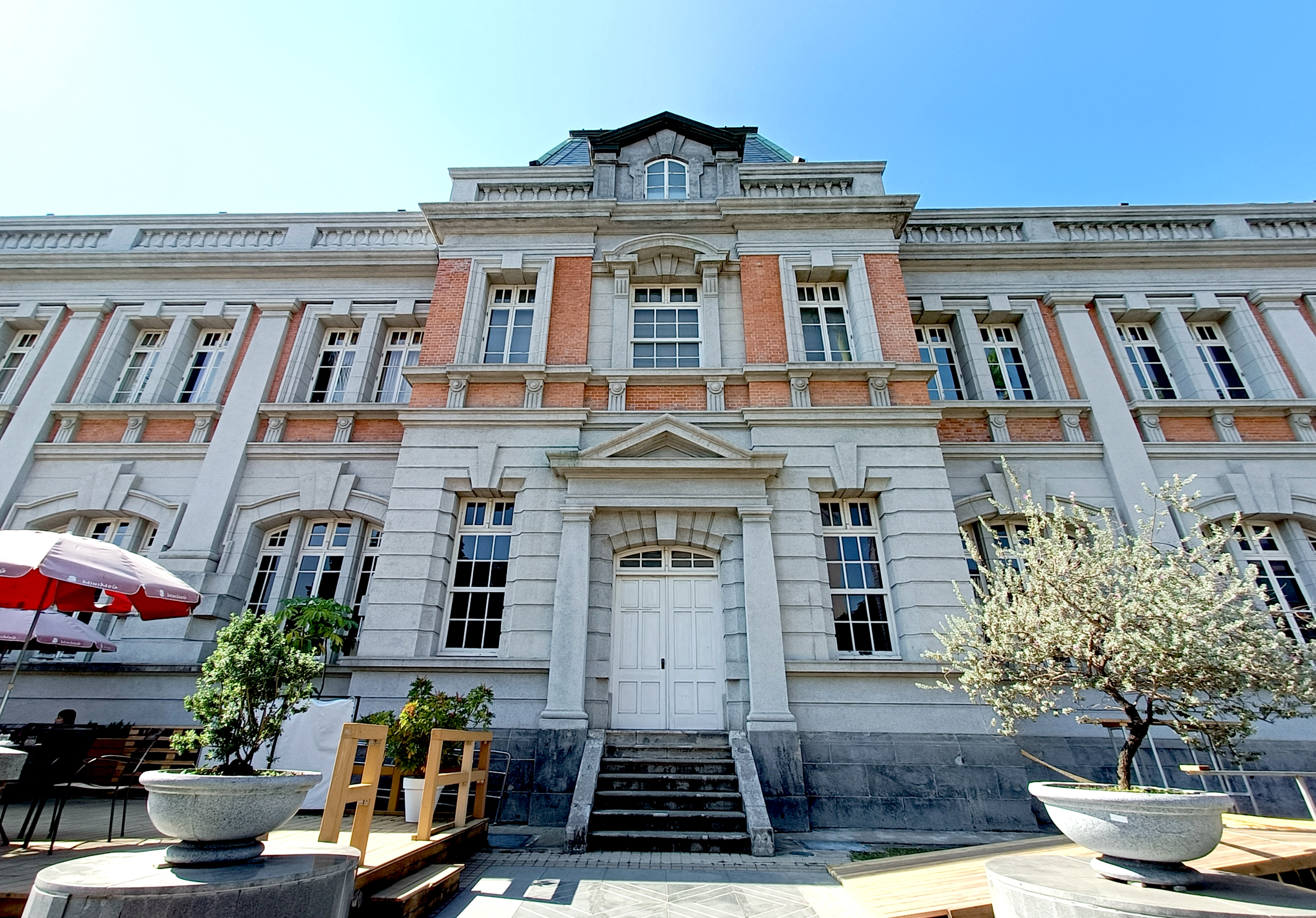
National Museum of Taiwan Literature Building in Tainan, built in 1916

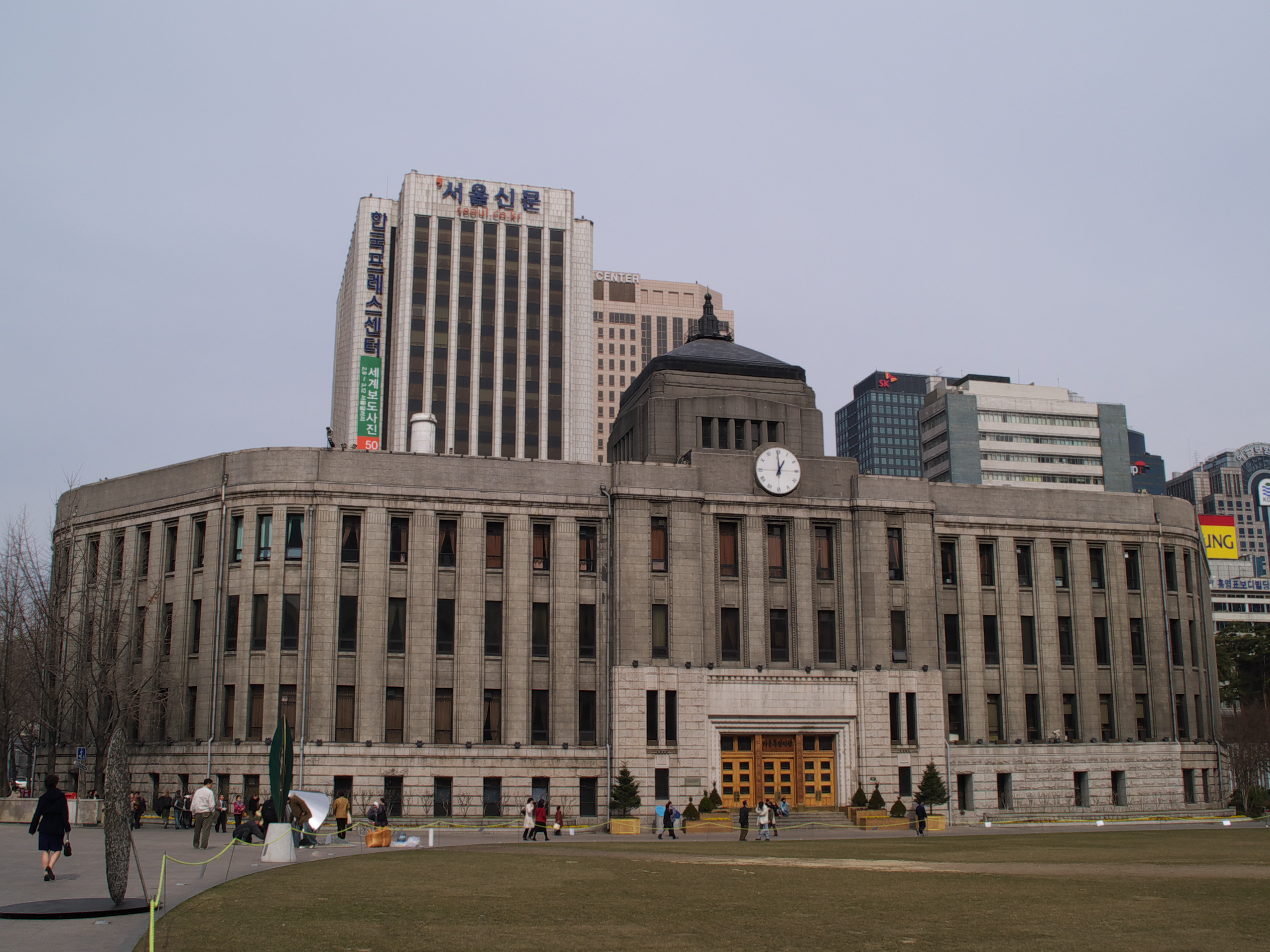
Seoul Metropolitan Library, built in 1925

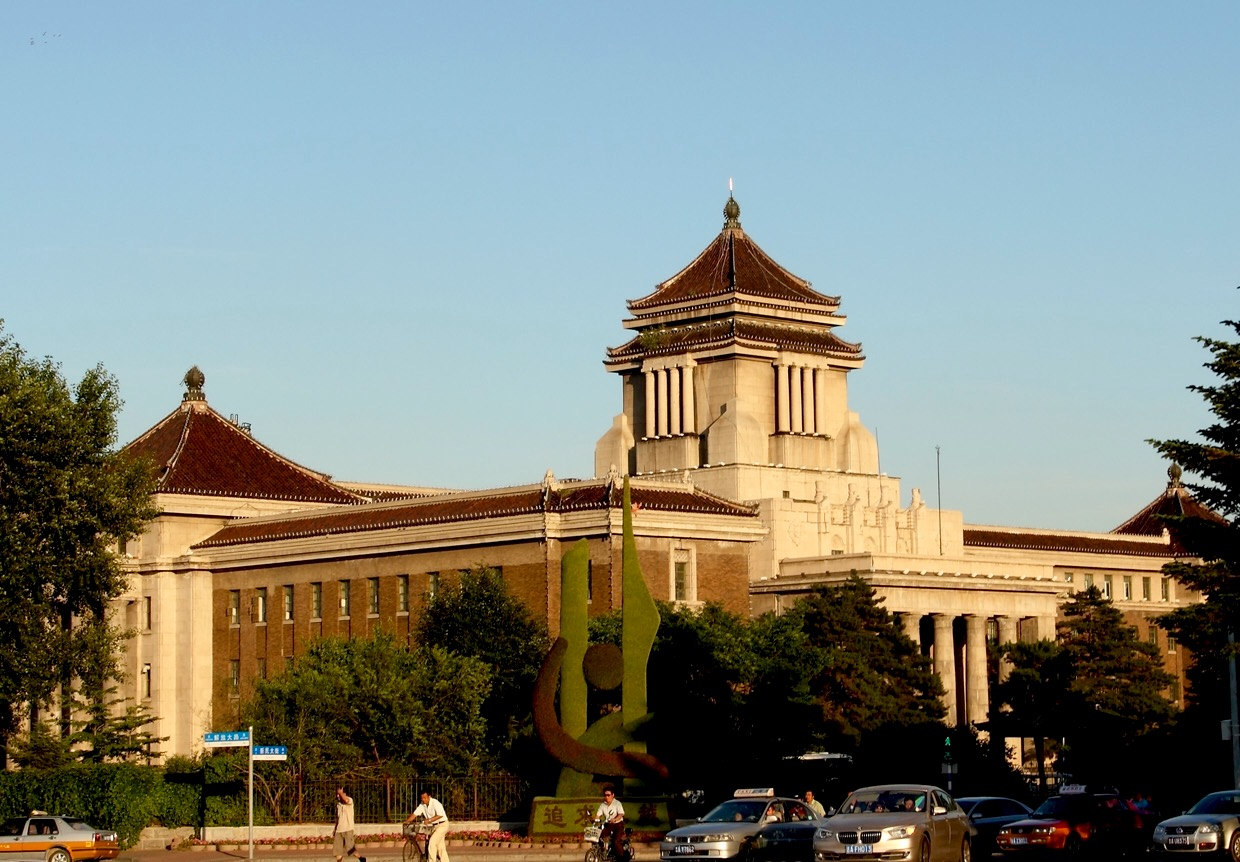
Manchukuo State Council building, Changchun

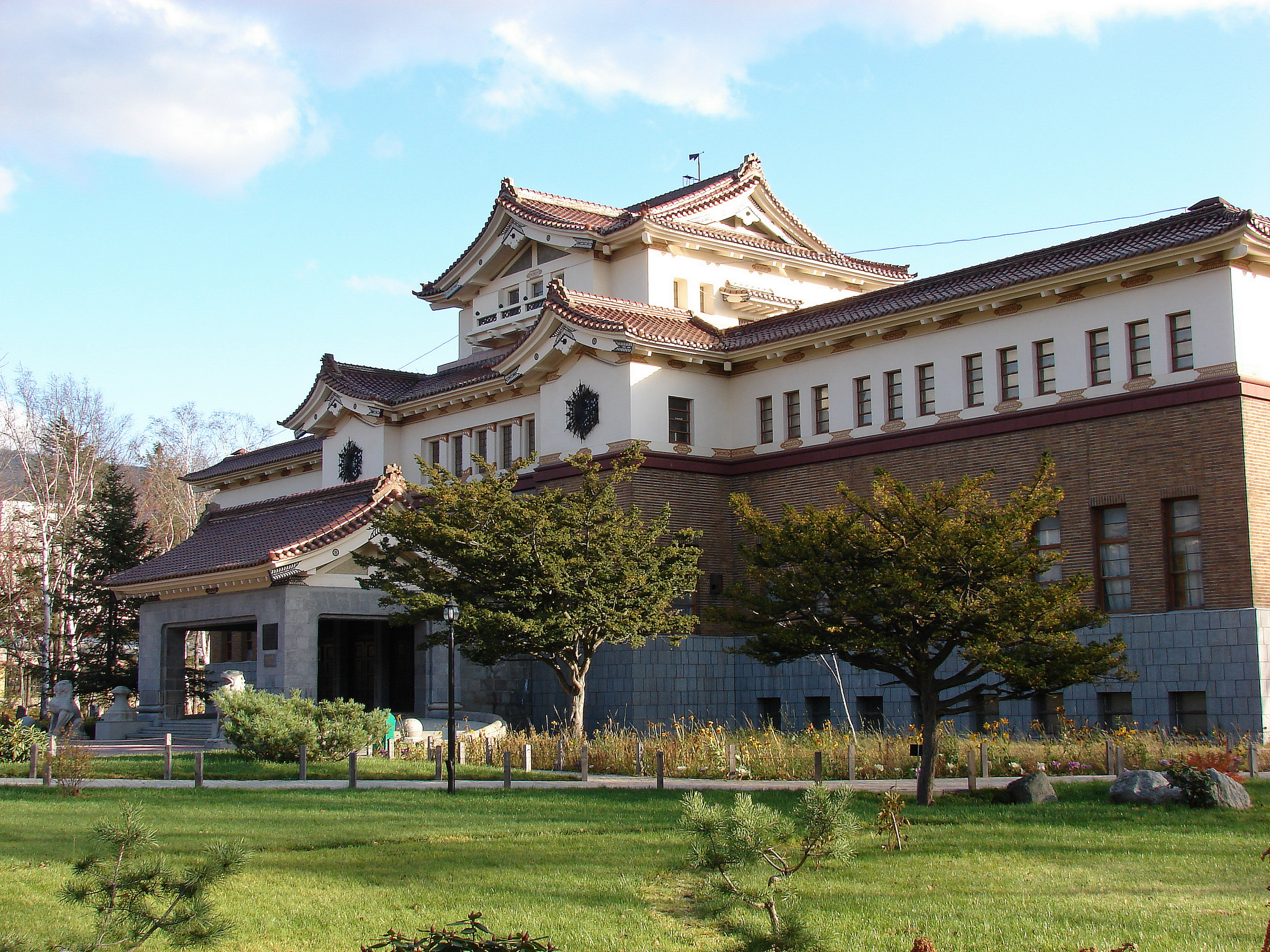
The Museum of Yuzhno-Sakhalinsk, completed in 1937

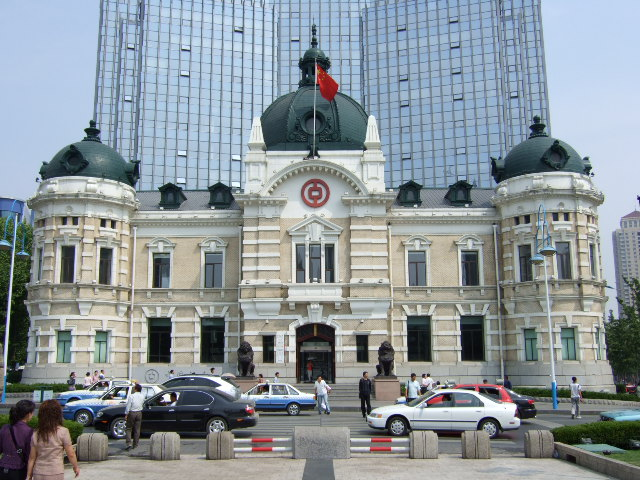
Bank of China Dalian branch, designed by Tsumaki Yorinaka in 1909

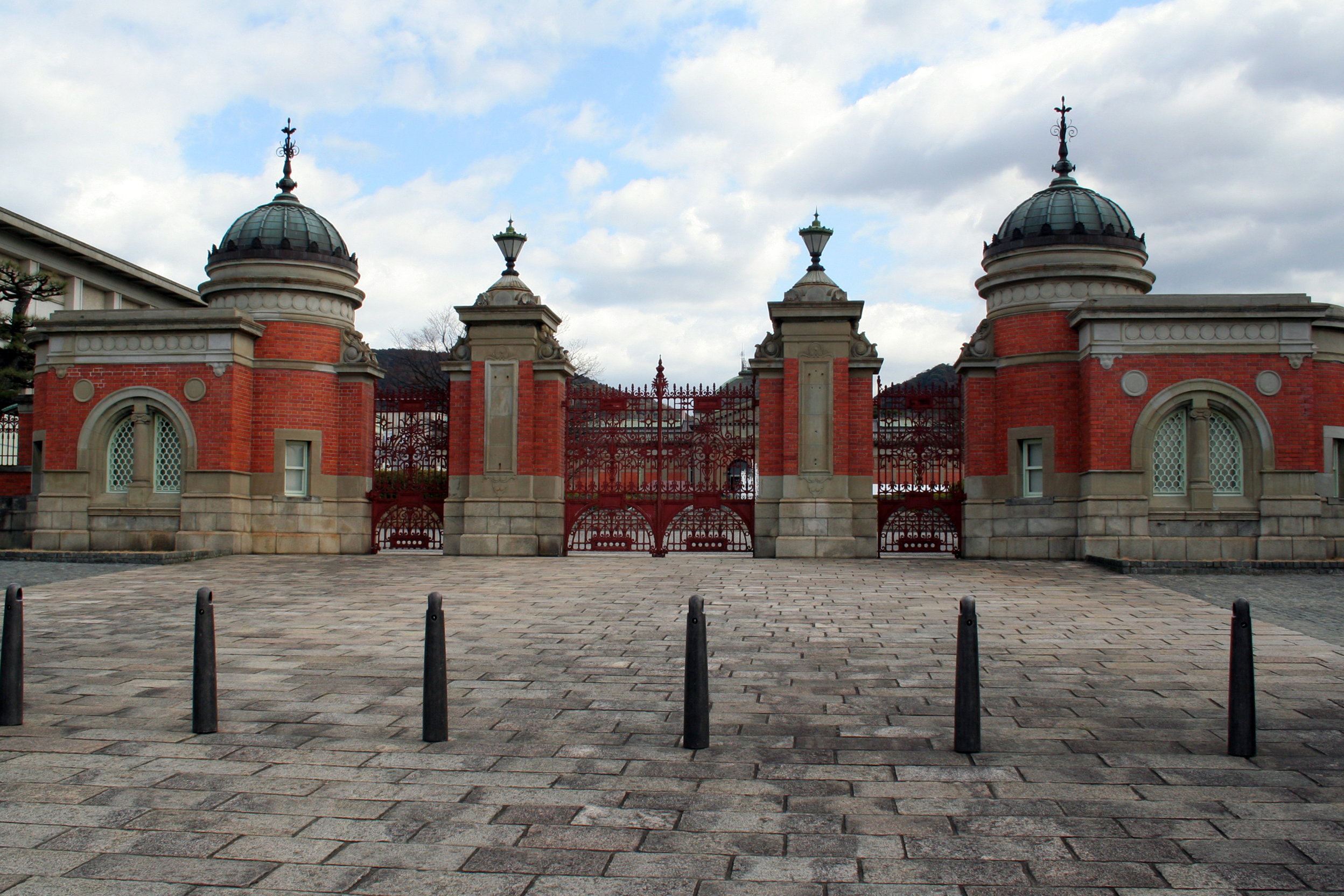
Kyoto National Museum in Kyōto, Tōkuma Katayama, built in 1895

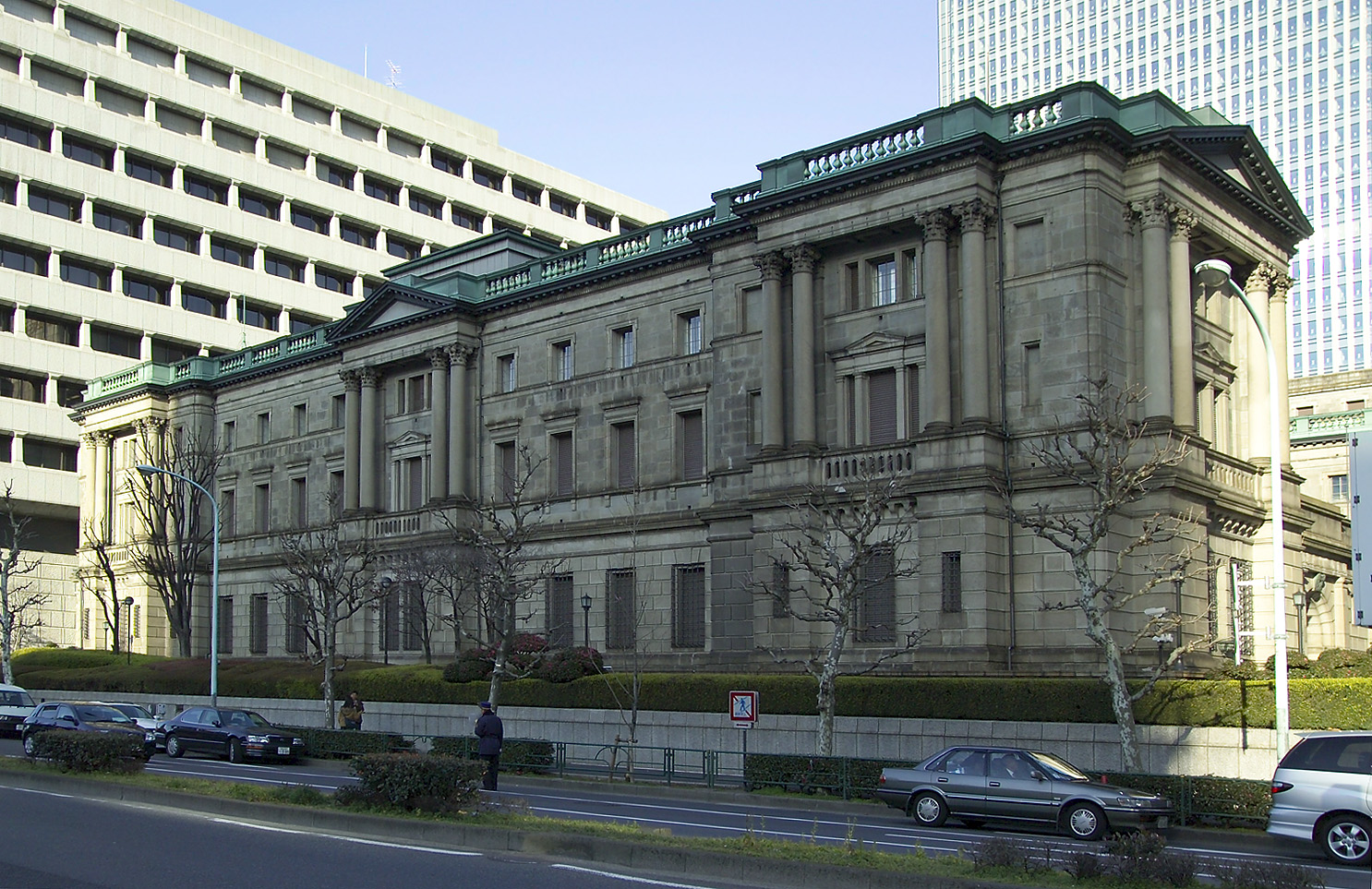
Bank of Japan, Tokyo, Kingo Tatsuno, built in 1896

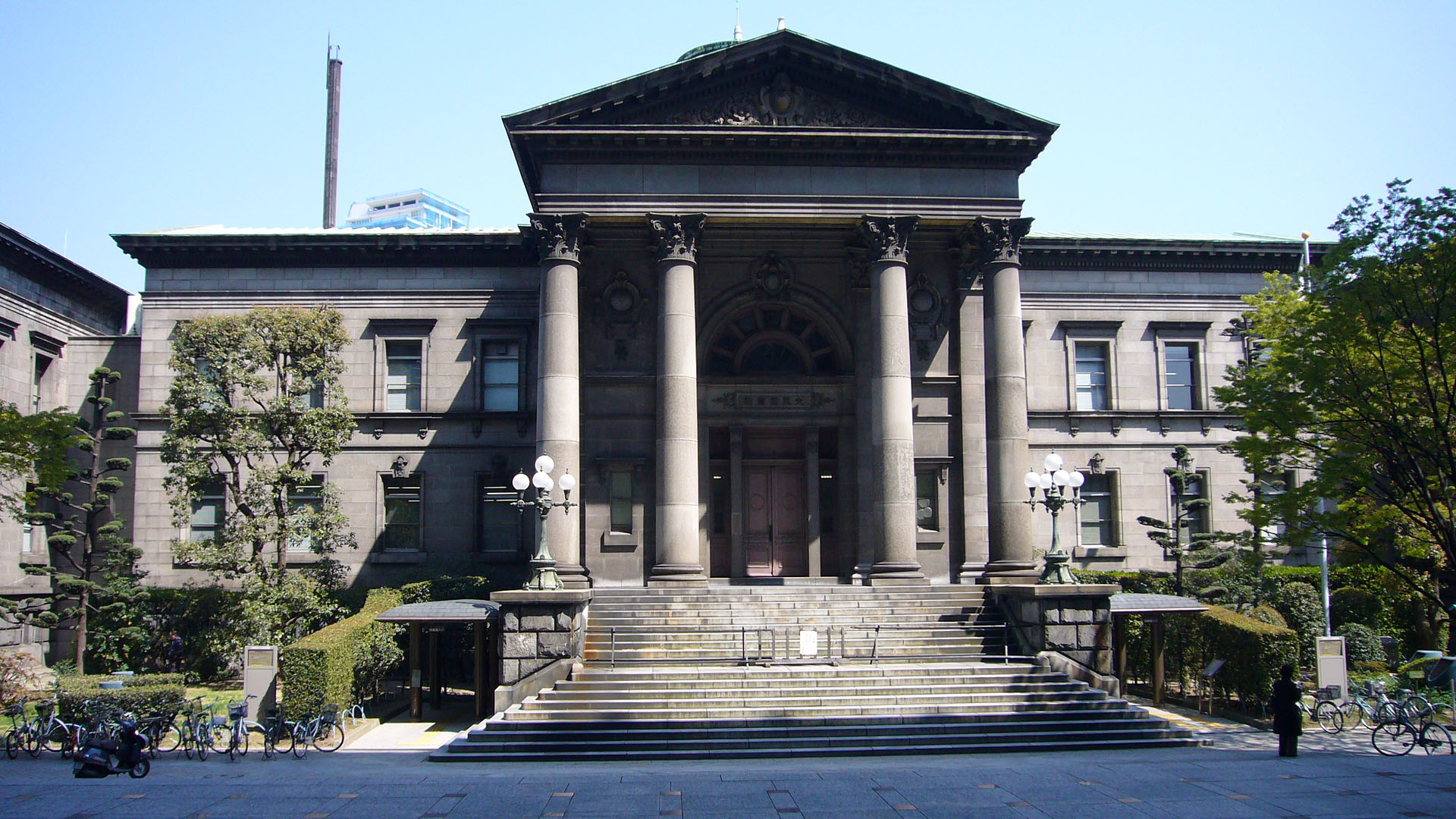
Osaka Prefectural Nakanoshima Library, Osaka, Magoichi Noguchi, built in 1904

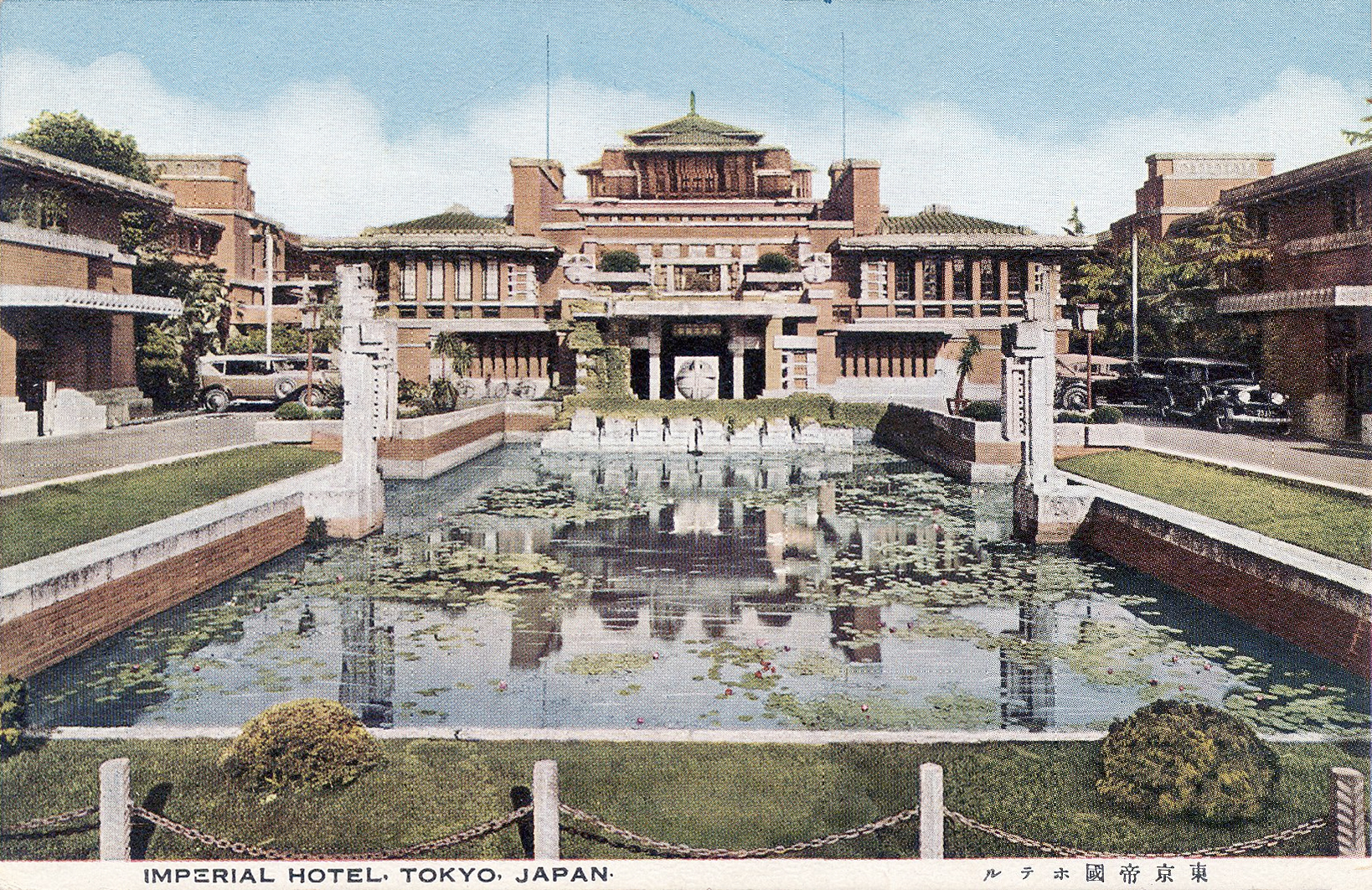
Imperial Hotel, Tōkyō, Frank Lloyd Wright, built between 1913 and 1924

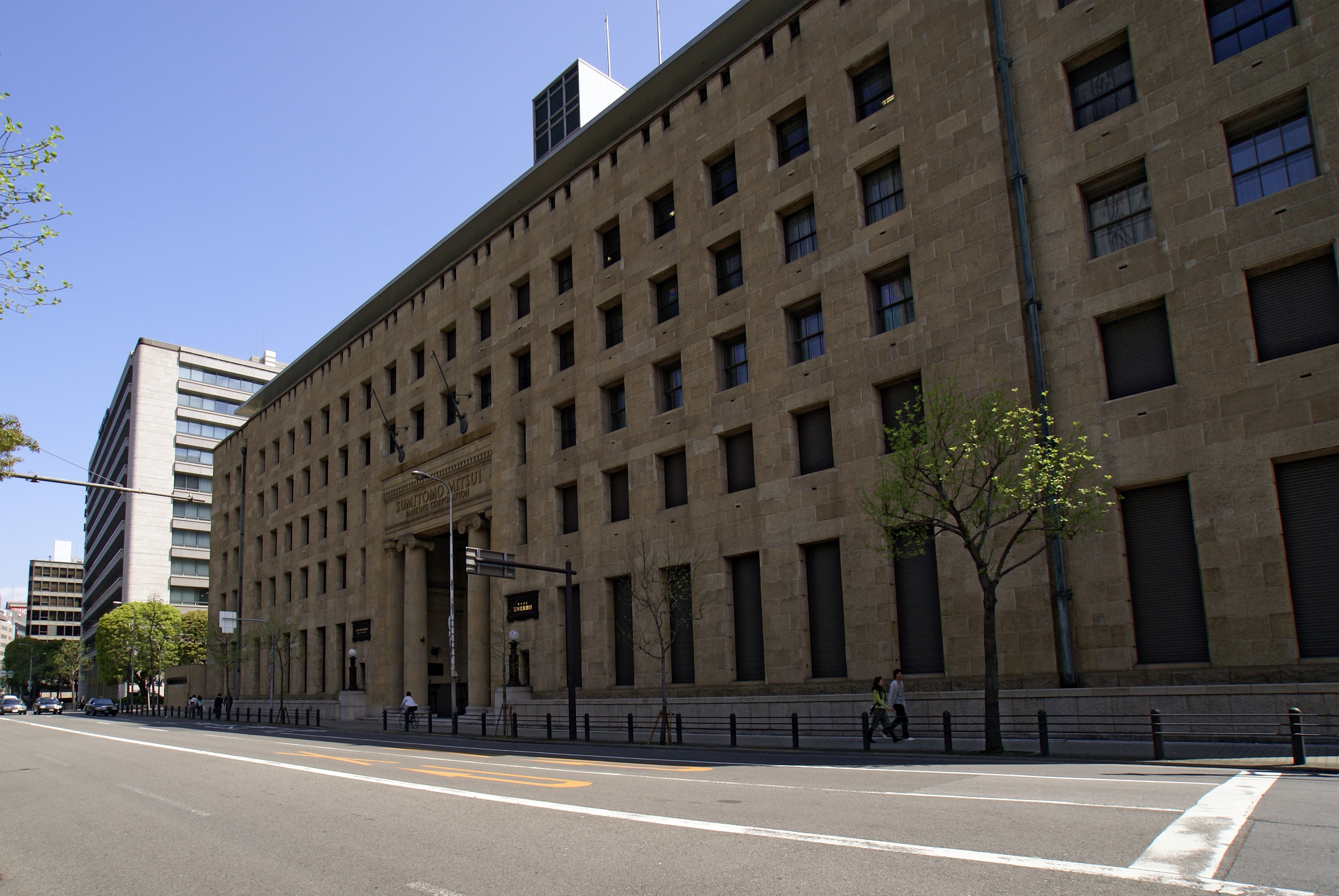
Sumitomo Building, Osaka, Eikichi Hasebe, built in 1924

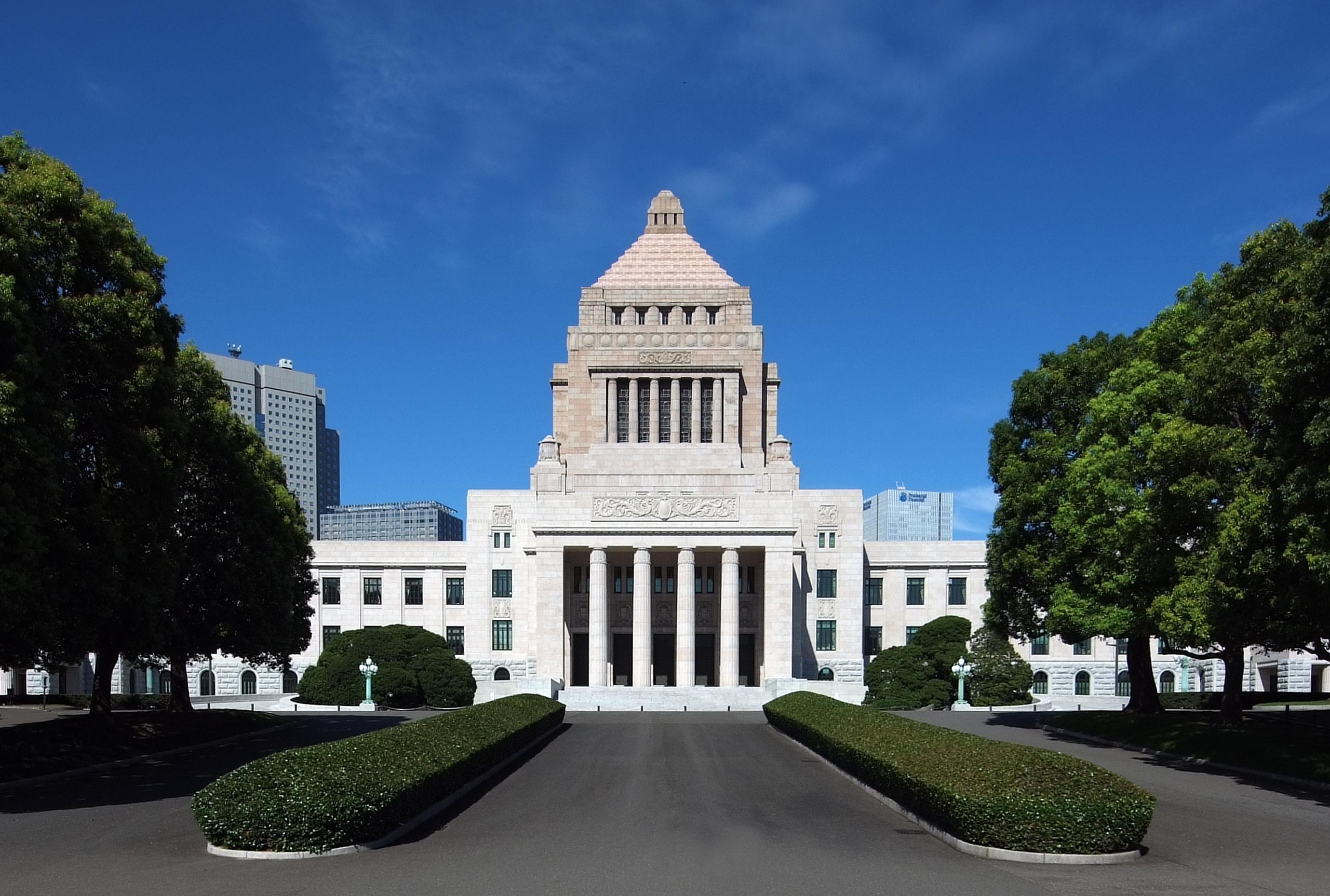
National Diet Building in Tōkyō, Kenkichi Yabashi, Yoshikuni Okuma, built in 1936

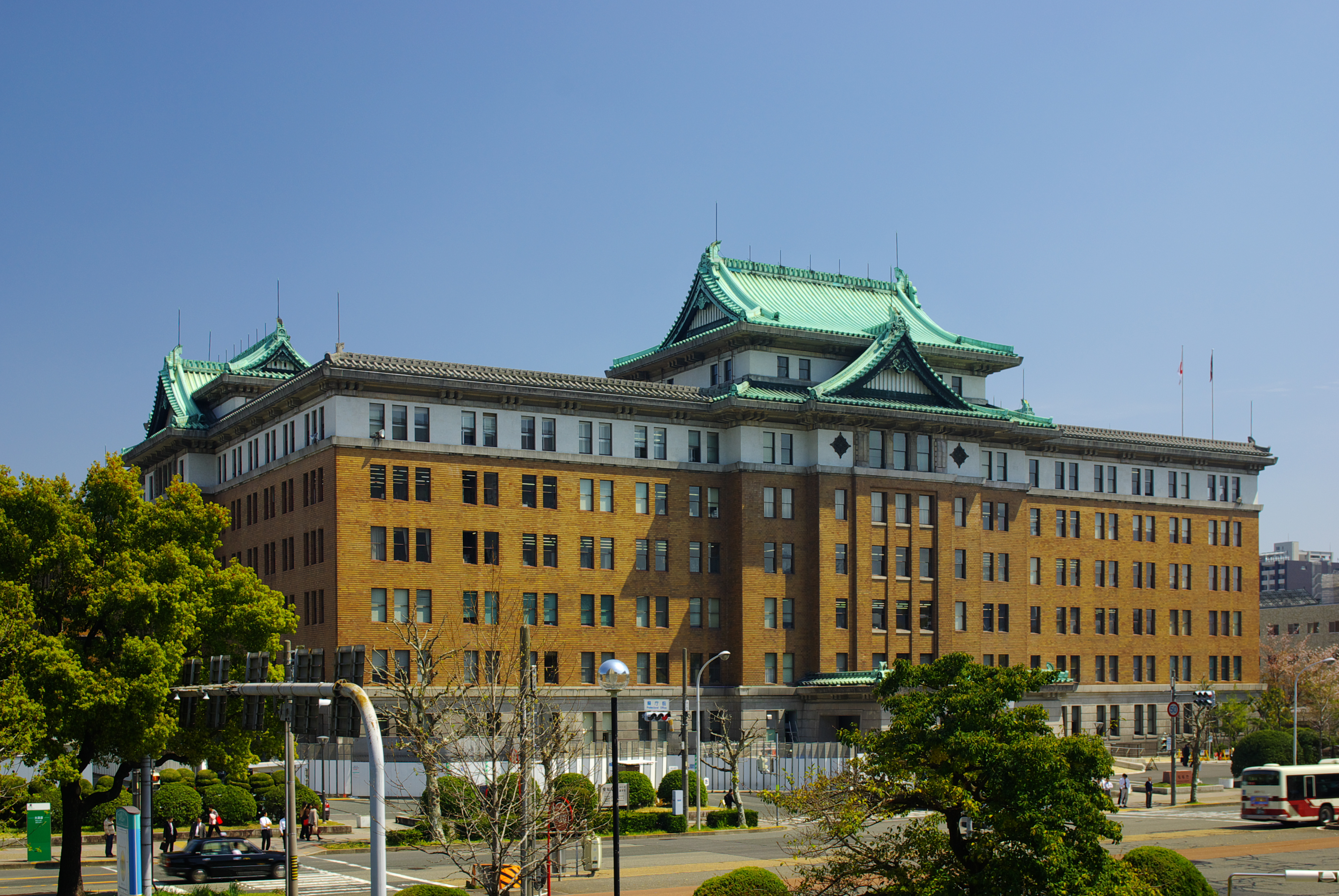
Main building of Aichi Prefectural Office, Yoshitoki Nishimura, Jin Watanabe, built in 1938

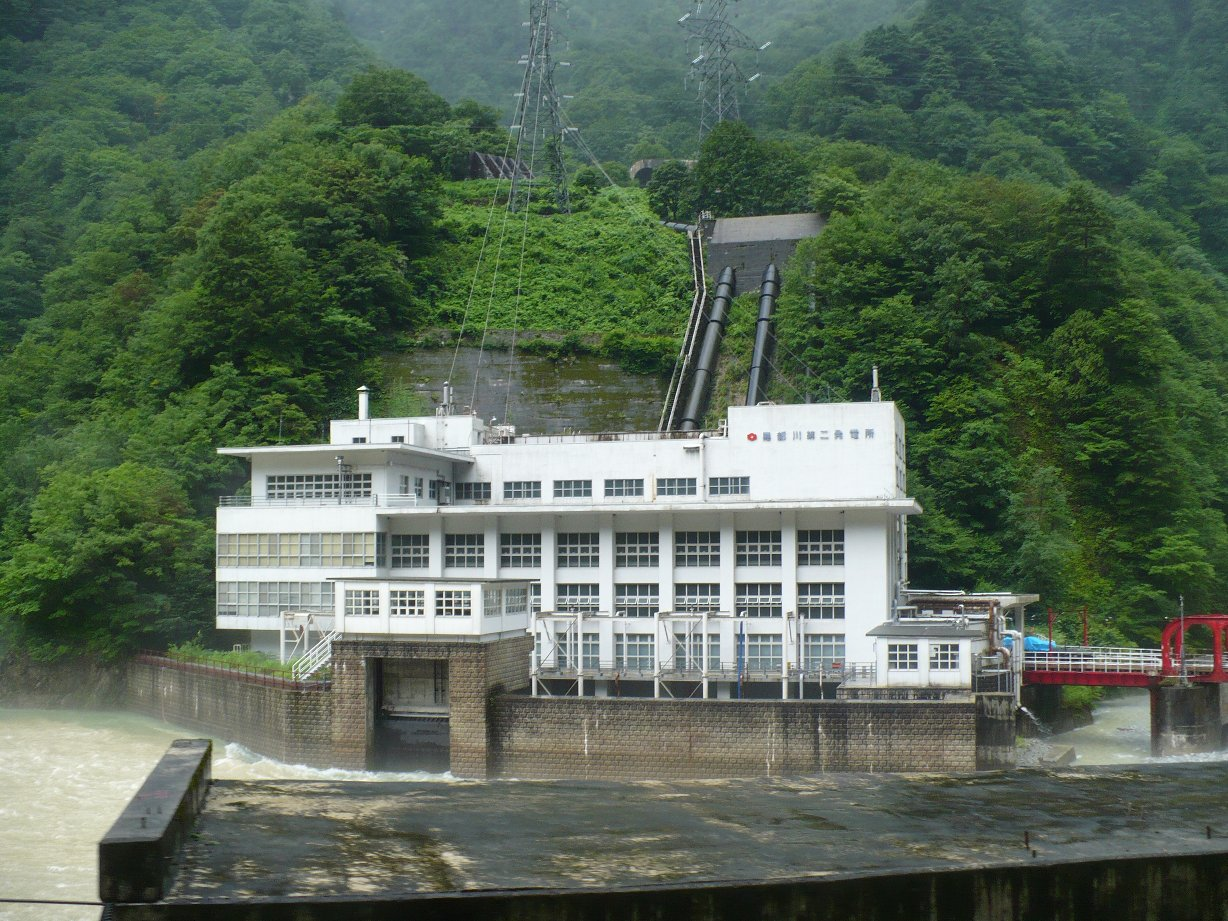
Kurobe Dam No 2 Power Plant, Bunzō Yamaguchi, built in 1938

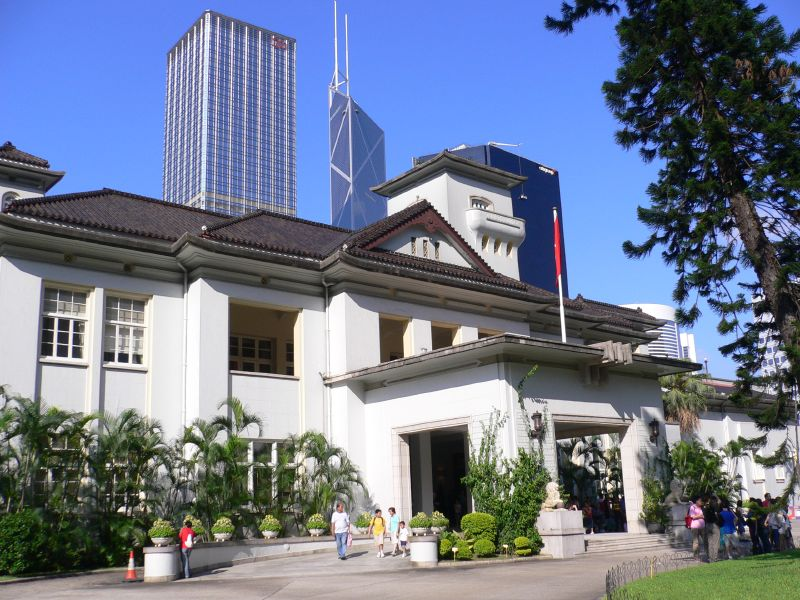
Government House in Hong Kong, Seichi Fujimura, rebuilt in 1941–1944

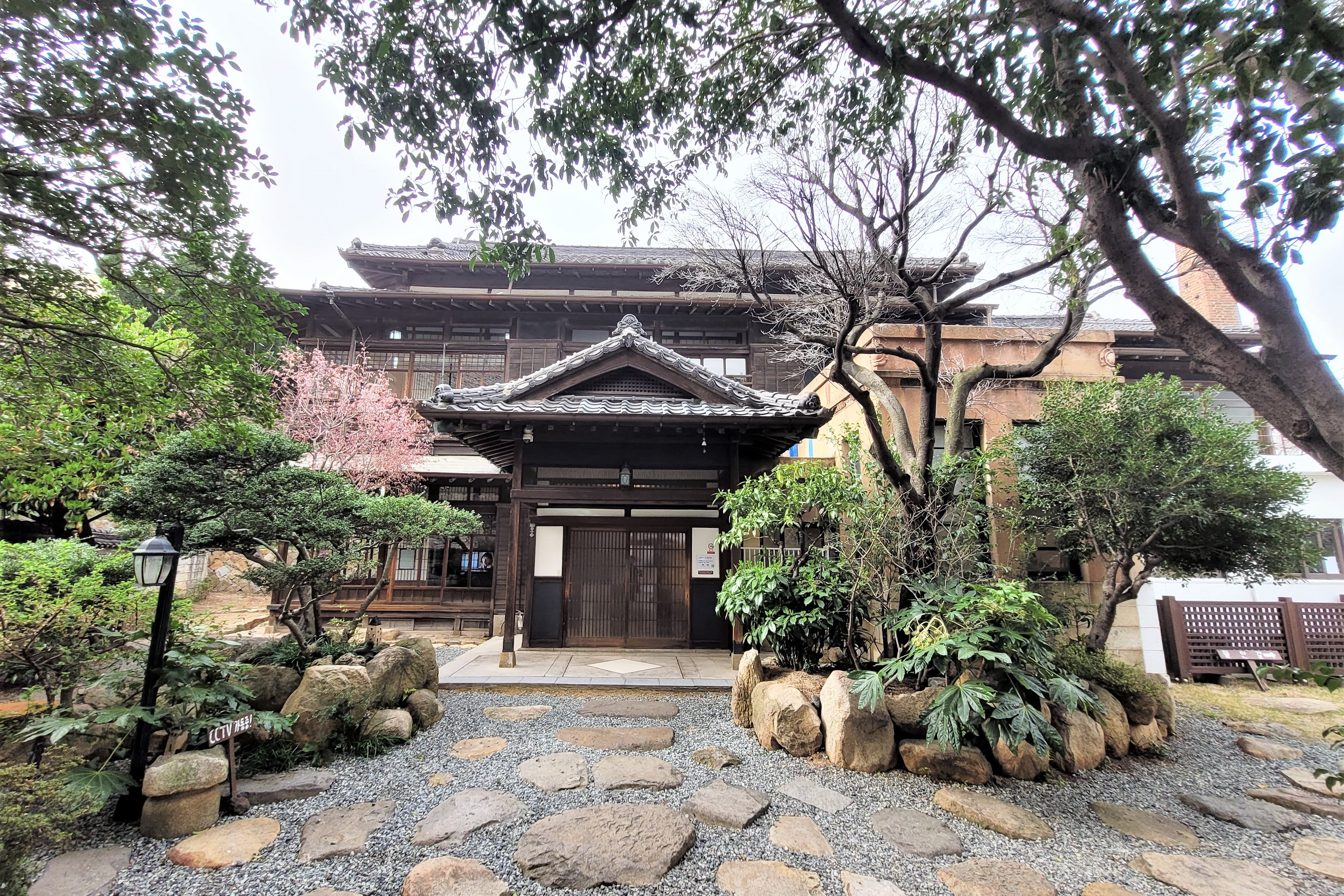
Jeong Ran Gak House in Busan, built in 1943

== Late Showa period ==
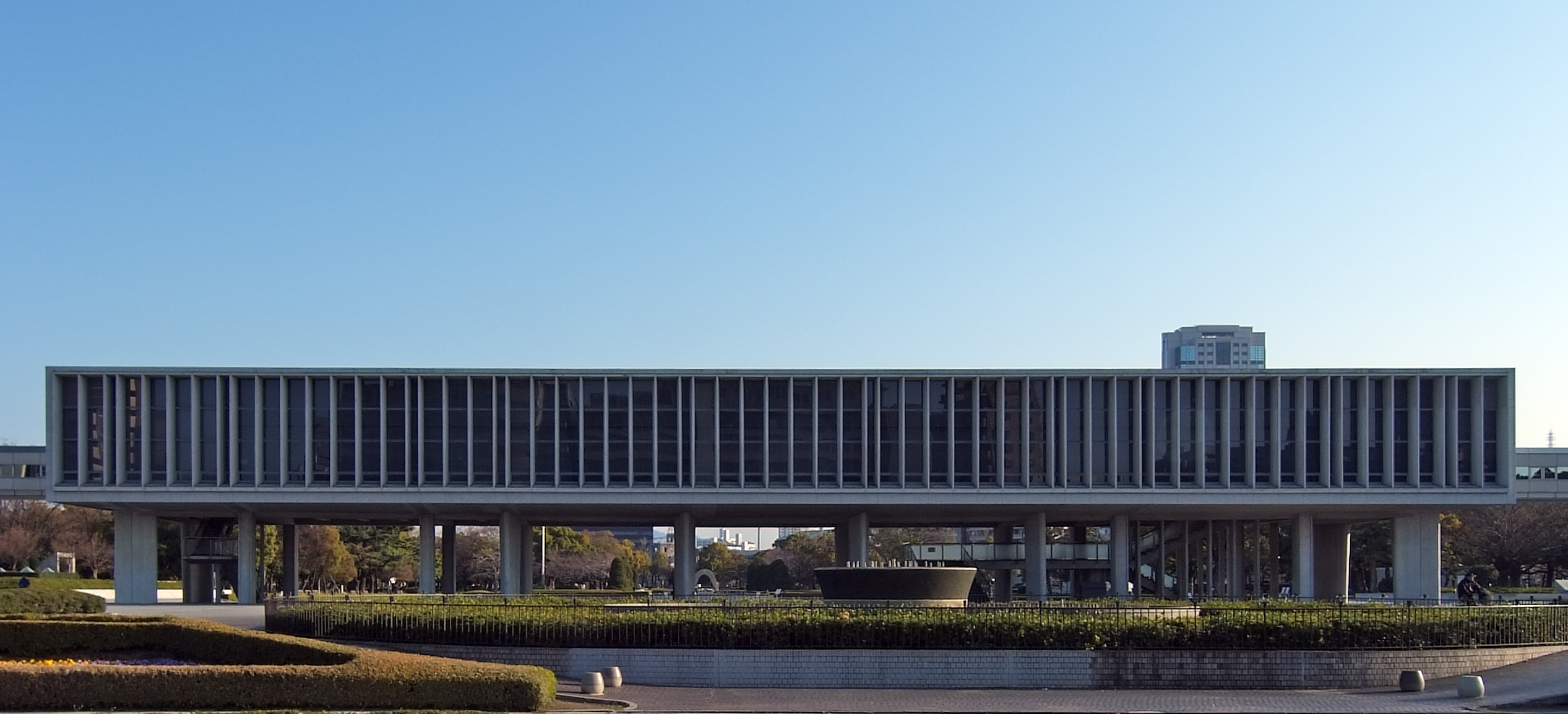
Hiroshima Peace Memorial Museum, built in 1955

After the war and under the influence of the Supreme Commander of the Allied Powers, General Douglas MacArthur, Japanese political and religious life was reformed to produce a demilitarised and democratic country. Although a new constitution was established in 1947, it was not until the beginning of the Korean War that Japan (as an ally of the United States) saw a growth in its economy brought about by the manufacture of industrial goods. In 1946 the Prefabricated Housing Association was formed to try and address the chronic shortage of housing, and architects like Kunio Maekawa submitted designs. However, it was not until the passing of the Public Housing Act in 1951 that housing built by the private sector was supported in law by the government. Also in 1946, the War Damage Rehabilitation Board put forward ideas for the reconstruction of thirteen Japanese cities. Architect Kenzō Tange submitted proposals for Hiroshima and Maebashi.

In 1949, Tange's winning competition entry to design the Hiroshima Peace Memorial Museum gave him international acclaim. The project (completed in 1955) led to a series of commissions including the Kagawa Prefectural Office Building in Takamatsu (1958) and Old Kurashiki City Hall (1960). At this time both Tange and Maekawa were interested in the tradition of Japanese architecture and the influence of local character. This was illustrated at Kagawa with elements of Heian period design fused with the International Style.

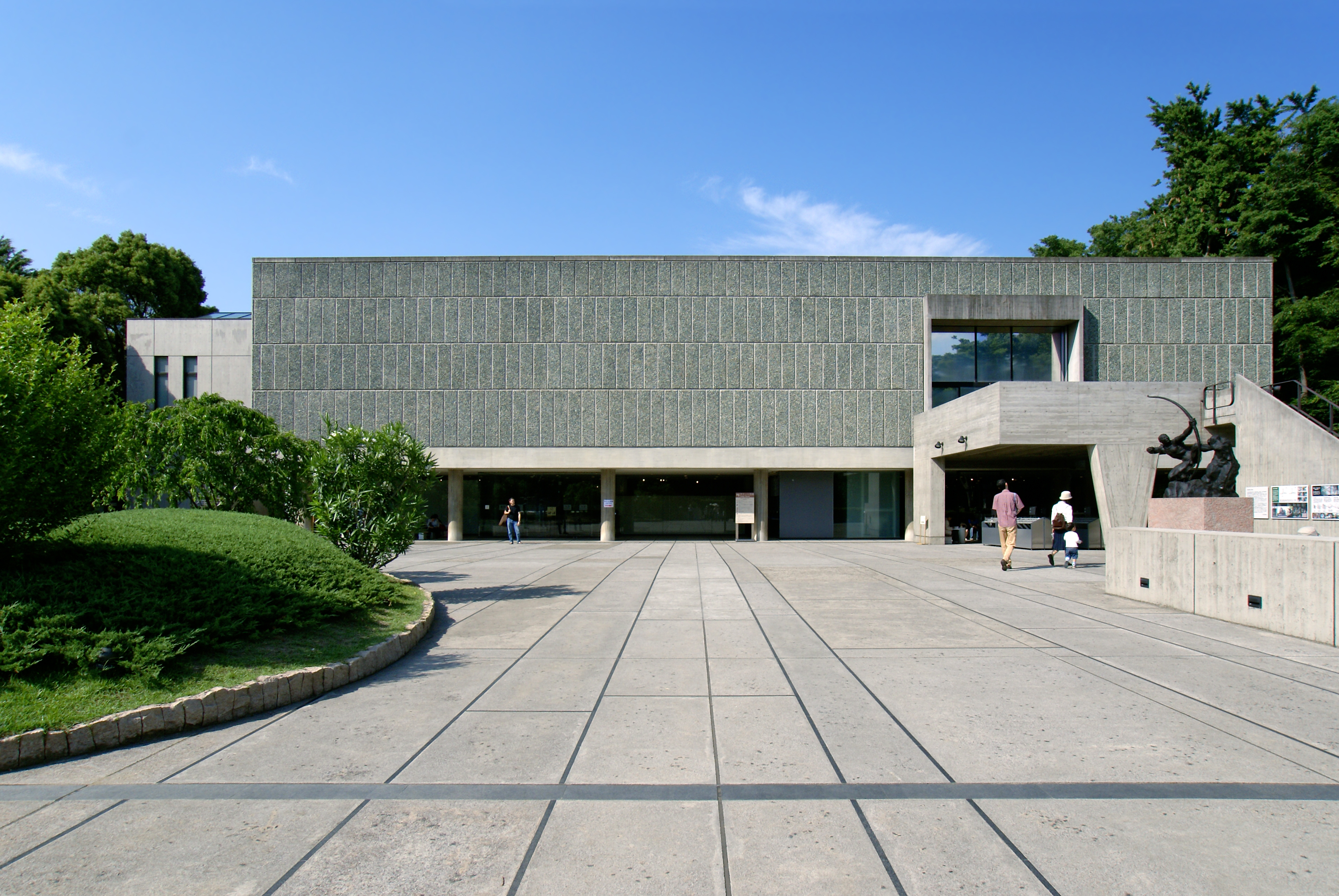
National Museum of Western Art, Tōkyō, built in 1955

In 1955, Le Corbusier was asked by the Japanese government to design the National Museum of Western Art in Tōkyō. He was assisted by his three former students: Maekawa, Sakakura and Takamasa Yoshizaka. The design was based upon Le Corbusier's museum in Ahmedabad, and both of the museums are square and raised on piloti.

Due largely to the influence of Tange, the 1960 World Design Conference was held in Tōkyō. A small group of Japanese designers who came to represent the Metabolist Movement presented their manifesto and a series of projects. The group included the architects Kiyonori Kikutake, Masato Ōtaka, Kisho Kurokawa and Fumihiko Maki. Originally known as the Burnt Ash School, the Metabolists associated themselves with idea of renewal and regeneration, rejecting visual representations of the past and promoting the idea that the individual, the house and the city were all parts of a single organism. Although the individual members of the group went in their own directions after a few years the enduring nature of their publications meant that they had a longer presence overseas. The international symbol of the Metabolists, the capsule, emerged as an idea in the late 1960s and was demonstrated in Kurokawa's Nakagin Capsule Tower in Tōkyō in 1972.

In the 1960s Japan saw both the rise and the expansion of large construction firms, including the Shimizu Corporation and Kajima. Nikken Sekkei emerged as a comprehensive company that often included elements of Metabolist design in its buildings.

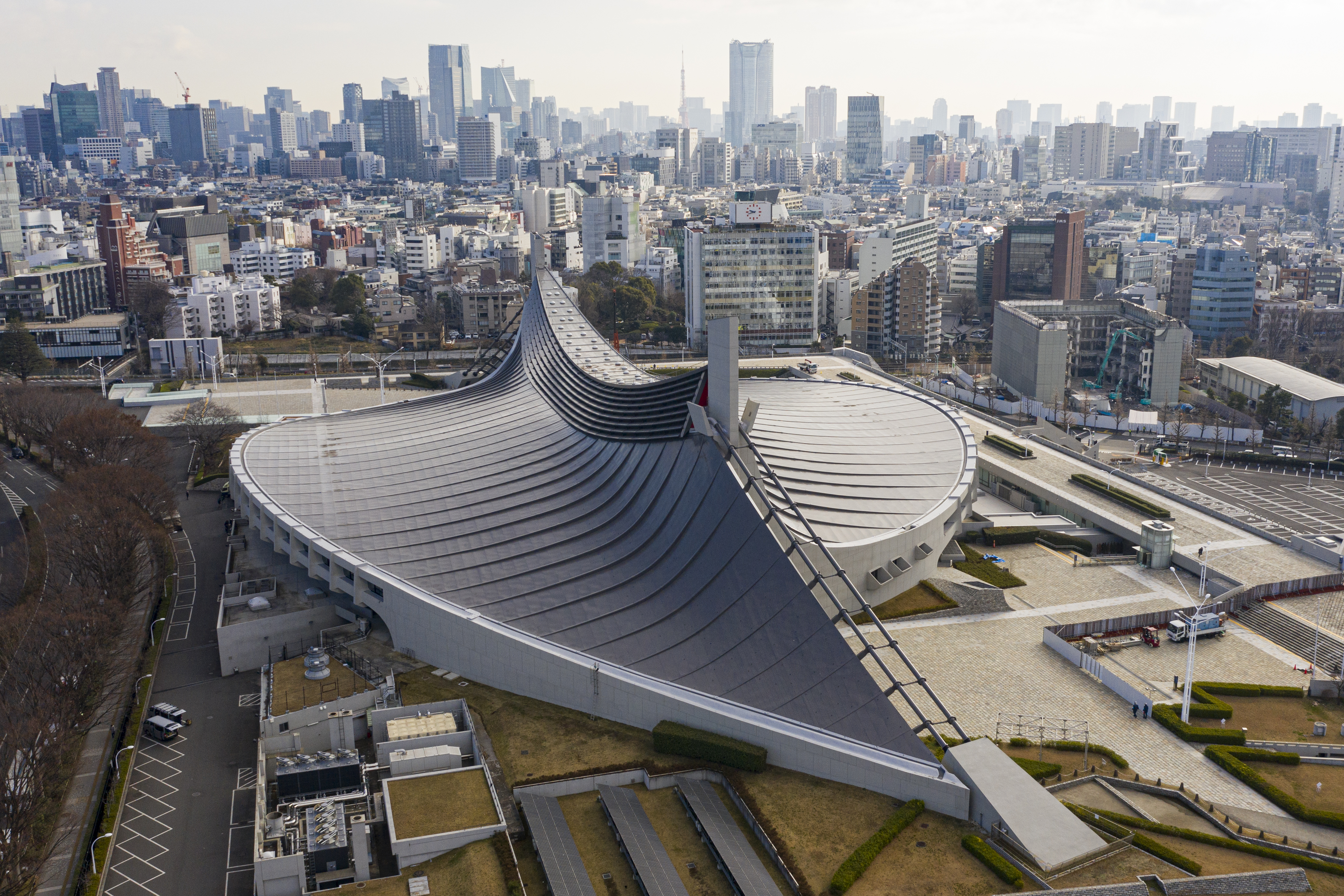
Yoyogi National Gymnasium, built for the 1964 Summer Olympics

The 1964 Summer Olympics in Tokyo saw a large boost to new design. Venues were constructed and the Yoyogi National Gymnasium, built between 1961 and 1964 by Kenzo Tange, became a landmark structure famous for its suspension roof design, recalling traditional elements of Shinto shrines. Other structures include the Nippon Budokan, the Komazawa Gymnasium and many others. The Olympic Games symbolised the re-emergence of Japan after the destruction of World War II, reflecting the new confidence in its architecture.

During the 1960s there were also architects who did not see the world of architecture in terms of Metabolism. For example, Kazuo Shinohara specialised in small residential projects in which he explored traditional architecture with simple elements in terms of space, abstraction and symbolism. In the Umbrella House (1961) he explored the spatial relationship between the doma (earth-paved internal floor) and the raised tatami floor in the living room and sleeping room. This relationship was explored further with the House with an Earthen floor (1963) where a tamped-down earthen floor was included in the kitchen area. His use of a roof to anchor his design for the House in White (1966) has been compared with Frank Lloyd Wright's Prairie Houses. Shinohara explored these abstractions as "Three Styles", which were periods of design that stretched from the early sixties to the mid seventies.

A former employee of Kenzo Tange was Arata Isozaki who was initially interested in the Metabolist Movement and produced innovative theoretical projects for the City in the Air (1961) and Future City (1962). However he soon moved away from this towards a more Mannerist approach similar to the work of James Stirling. This was particularly striking at the Oita Branch for Fukuoka Mutual (1967) with its mathematical grids, concrete construction and exposed services. In the Gunma Prefectural Museum (1971–74) he experimented with cubic elements (some of them twelve metres to a side) overlaid by a secondary grid expressed by the external wall panels and fenestration. This rhythm of panelling may have been influenced by Corbusier's detailing on the Museum of Western Art in Tōkyō.

Japanese cities where they lack European-like piazzas and squares often emphasise the relationship of people with the everyday workings of the street. Fumihiko Maki was one of a number of architects who were interested in the relationship of architecture and the city and this can be seen in works like Ōsaka Prefectural Sports Centre (1972) and Spiral in Tōkyō (1985). Likewise, Takefumi Aida (member of the group known as ArchiteXt) rejected the ideas of the Metabolist Movement and explored urban semiology.

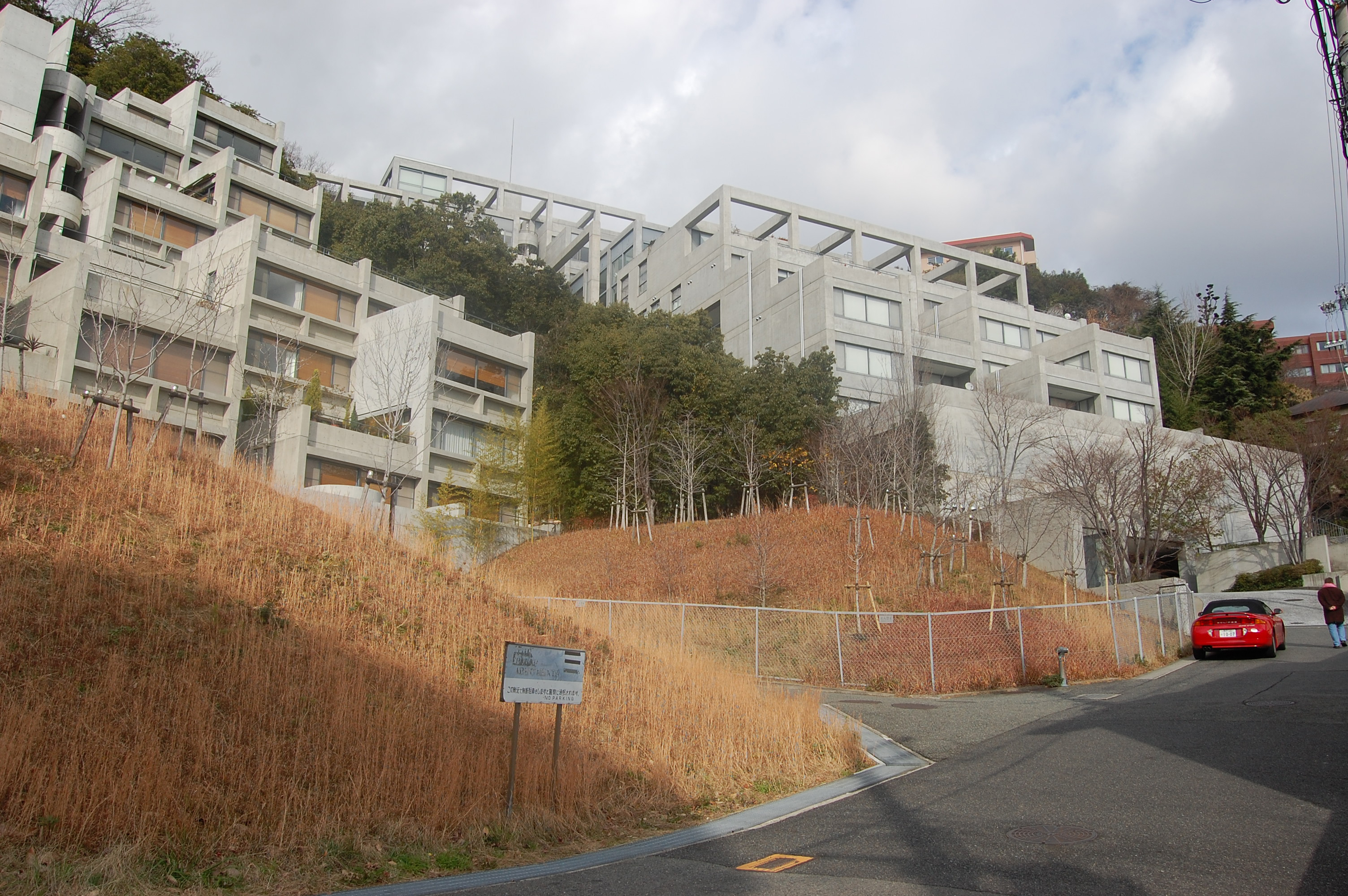
Rokkō Housing 1, Kōbe, built in 1985

In the late seventies and early eighties Tadao Ando's architecture and theoretical writings explored the idea of Critical regionalism – the idea of promoting local or national culture within architecture. Ando's interpretation of this was demonstrated by his idea of reacquainting the Japanese house with nature, a relationship he thought had been lost with Modernist architecture. His first projects were for small urban houses with enclosed courtyards (such as the Azuma House in Ōsaka in 1976). His architecture is characterised by the use of concrete, but it has been important for him to use the interplay of light, through time, with this and other materials in his work. His ideas about the integration of nature converted well into larger projects such as the Rokkō Housing 1 (1983) (on a steep site on Mount Rokkō) and the Church on the Water (1988) in Tomamu, Hokkaidō.

The late eighties saw the first work by architects of the so-called "Shinohara" school. This included Toyō Itō and Itsuko Hasegawa who were both interested in urban life and the contemporary city. Itō concentrated on the dynamism and mobility of the city's "urban nomads" with projects like the Tower of Winds (1986) which integrated natural elements like light and wind with those of technology. Hasegawa concentrated on what she termed "architecture as another nature". Her Shōnandai Cultural Centre in Fujisawa (1991) combined the natural environment with new high-tech materials.

Highly individualist architects of the late eighties included the monumental buildings of Shin Takamatsu and the "cosmic" work of Masaharu Takasaki. Takasaki, who worked with the Austrian architect Günther Domenig in the 1970s shares Domenig's organic architecture. His Zero Cosmology House of 1991 in Kagoshima Prefecture constructed from concrete has a contemplative egg-shaped "zero space" at its centre.

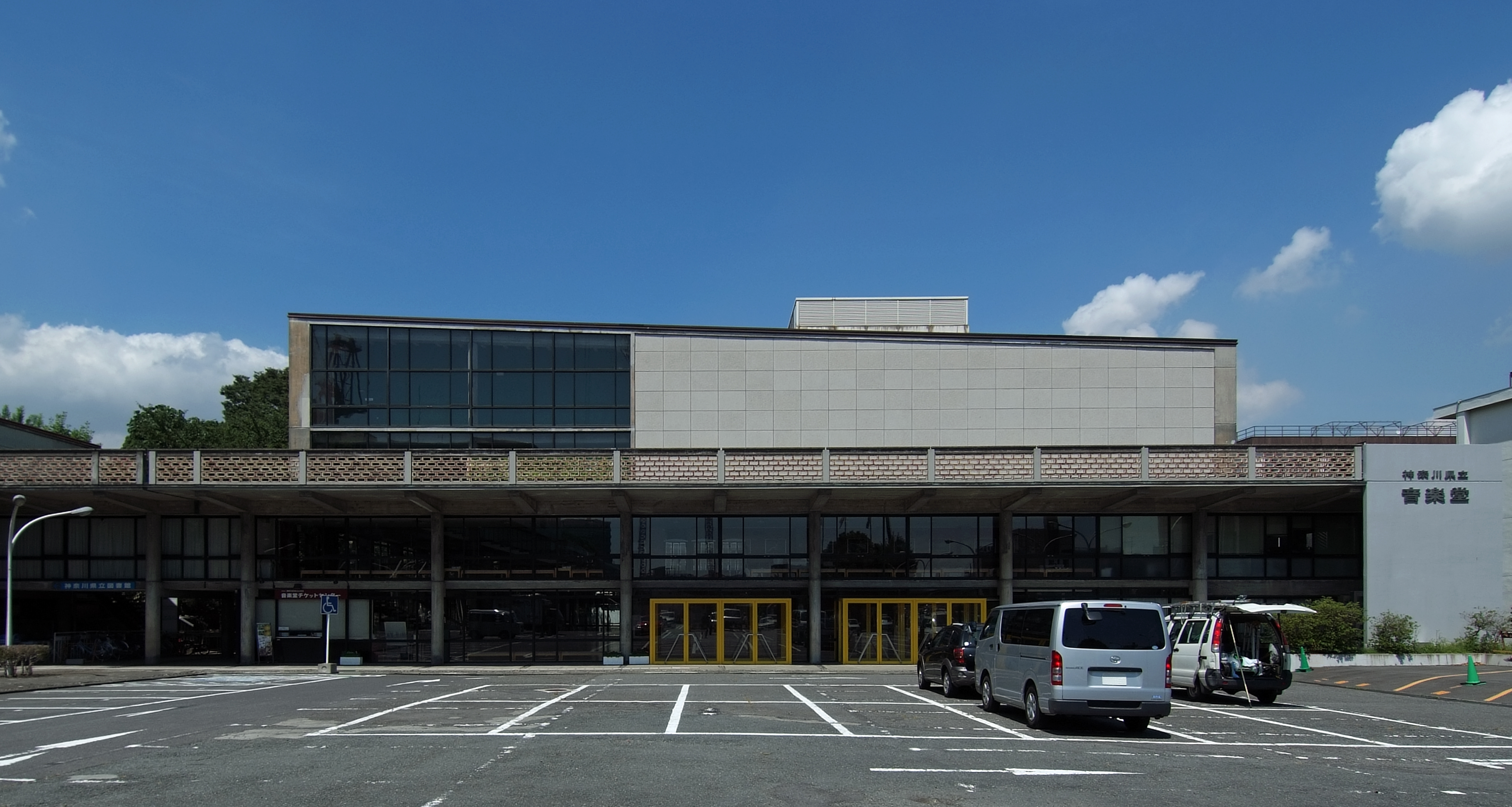
Kanagawa Prefectural Library and Music Hall, Yokohama, built in 1954

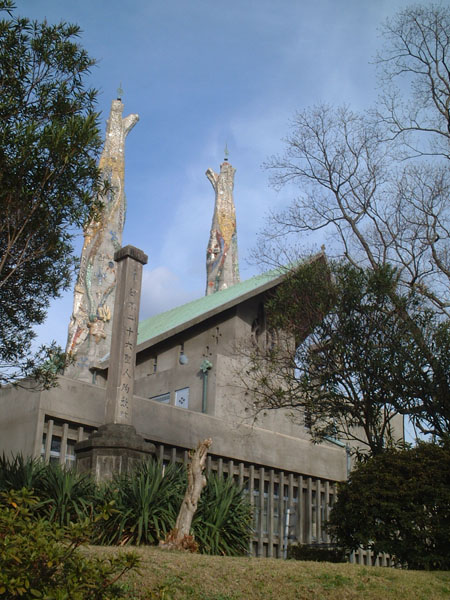
Twenty-Six Martyrs Museum and Monument, Nagasaki, built in 1962

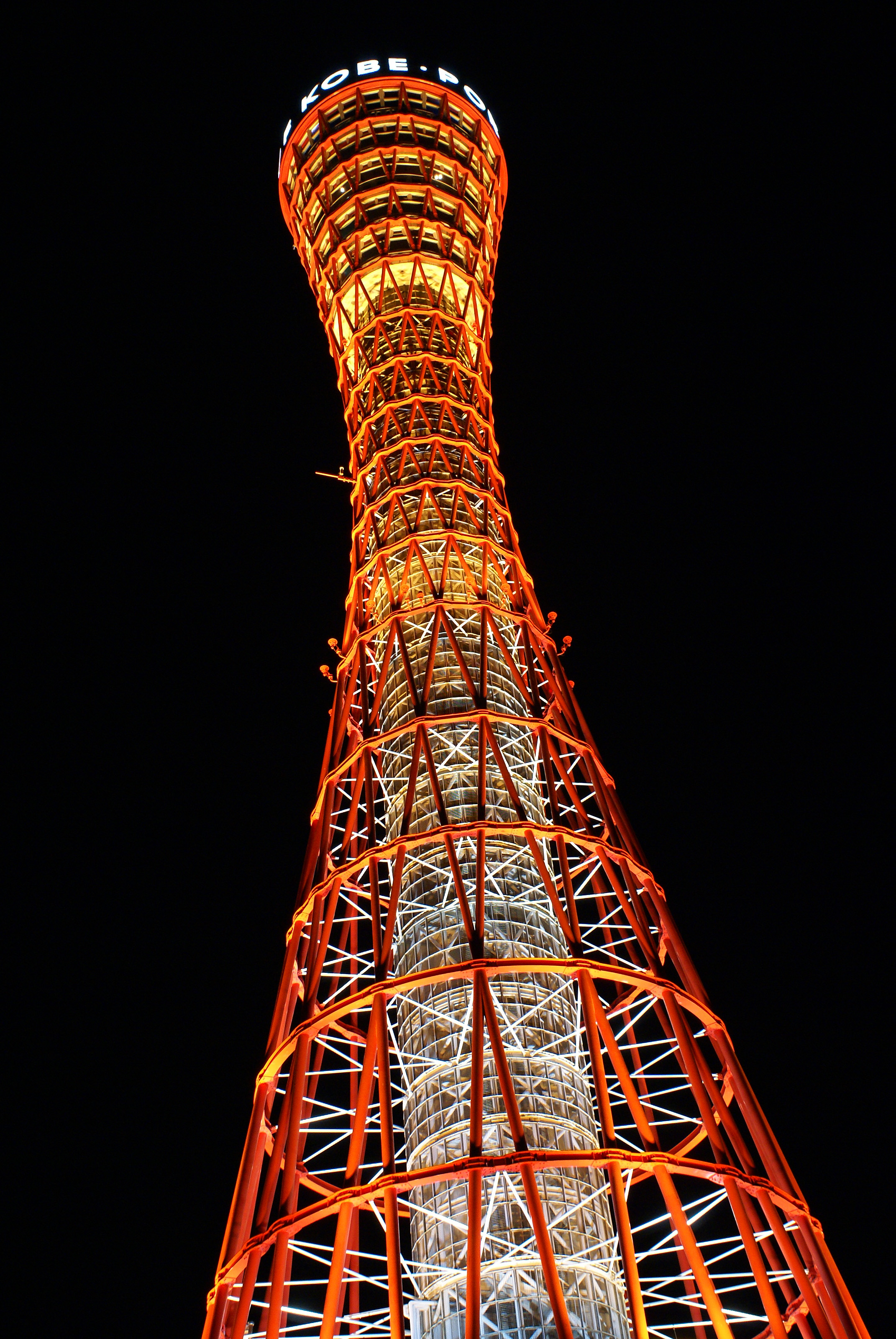
Kobe Port Tower, Kōbe, built in 1963

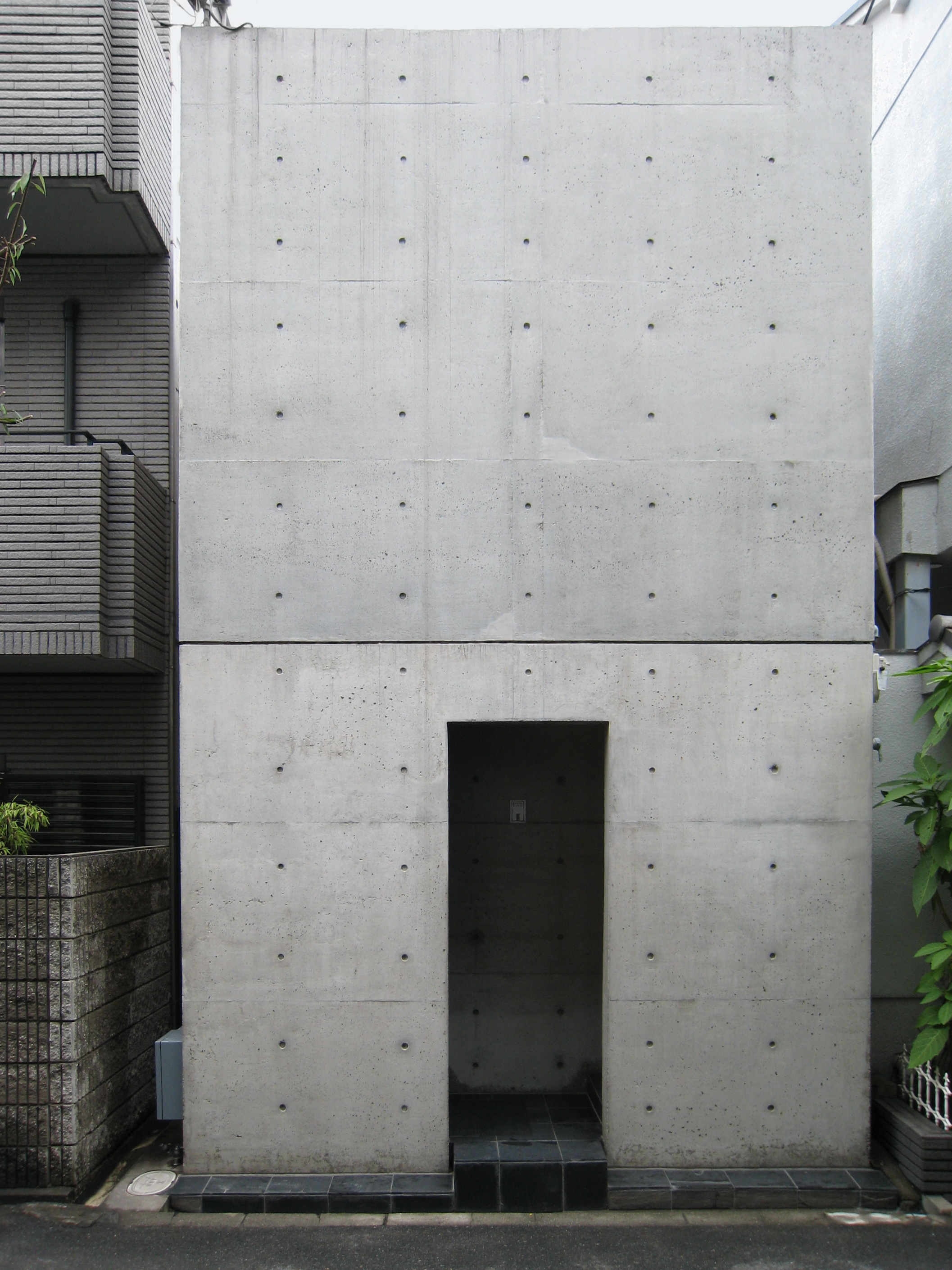
Azuma House, Ōsaka, built in 1976

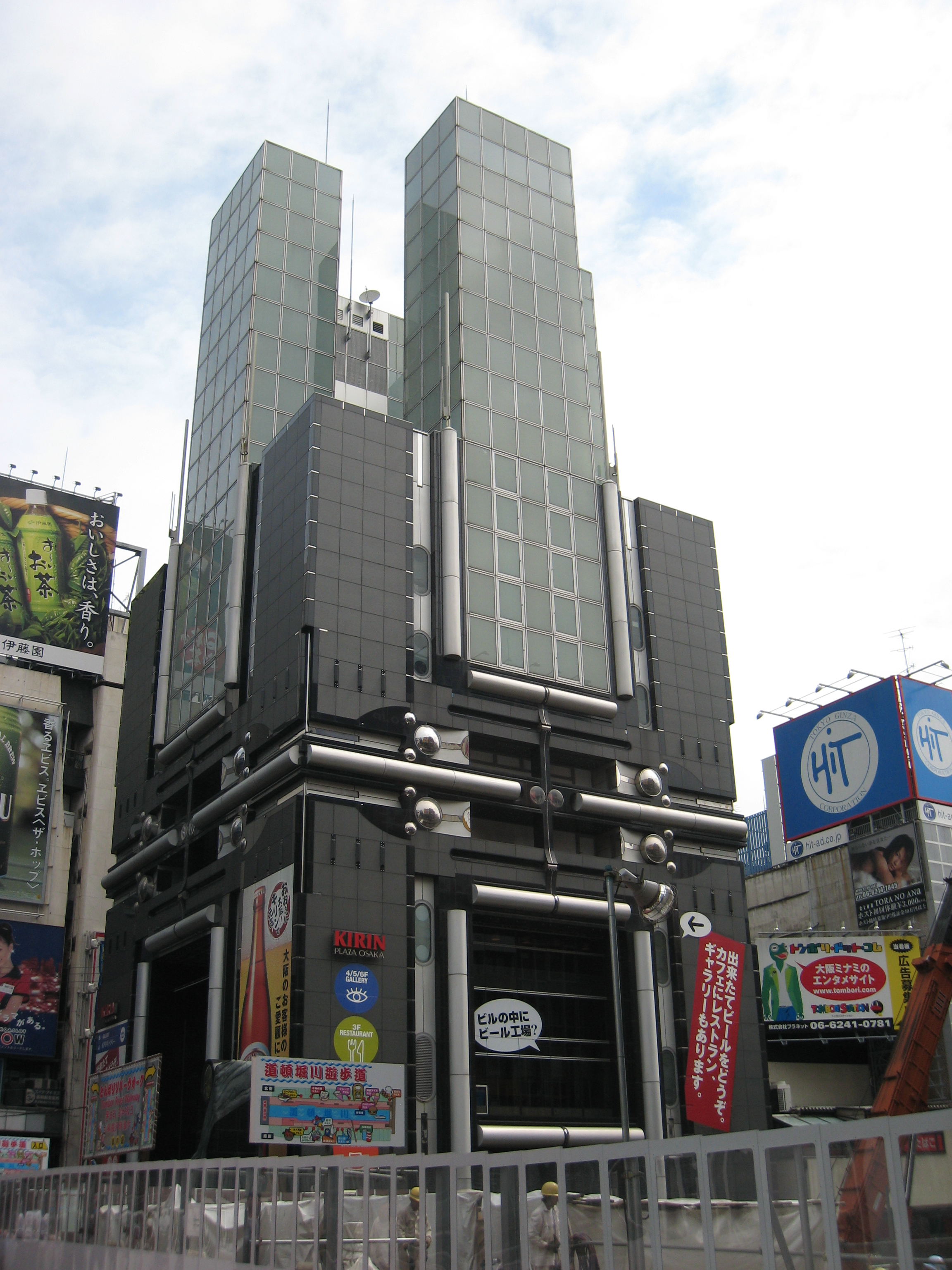
Kirin Plaza, Ōsaka, built in 1987 (now demolished)

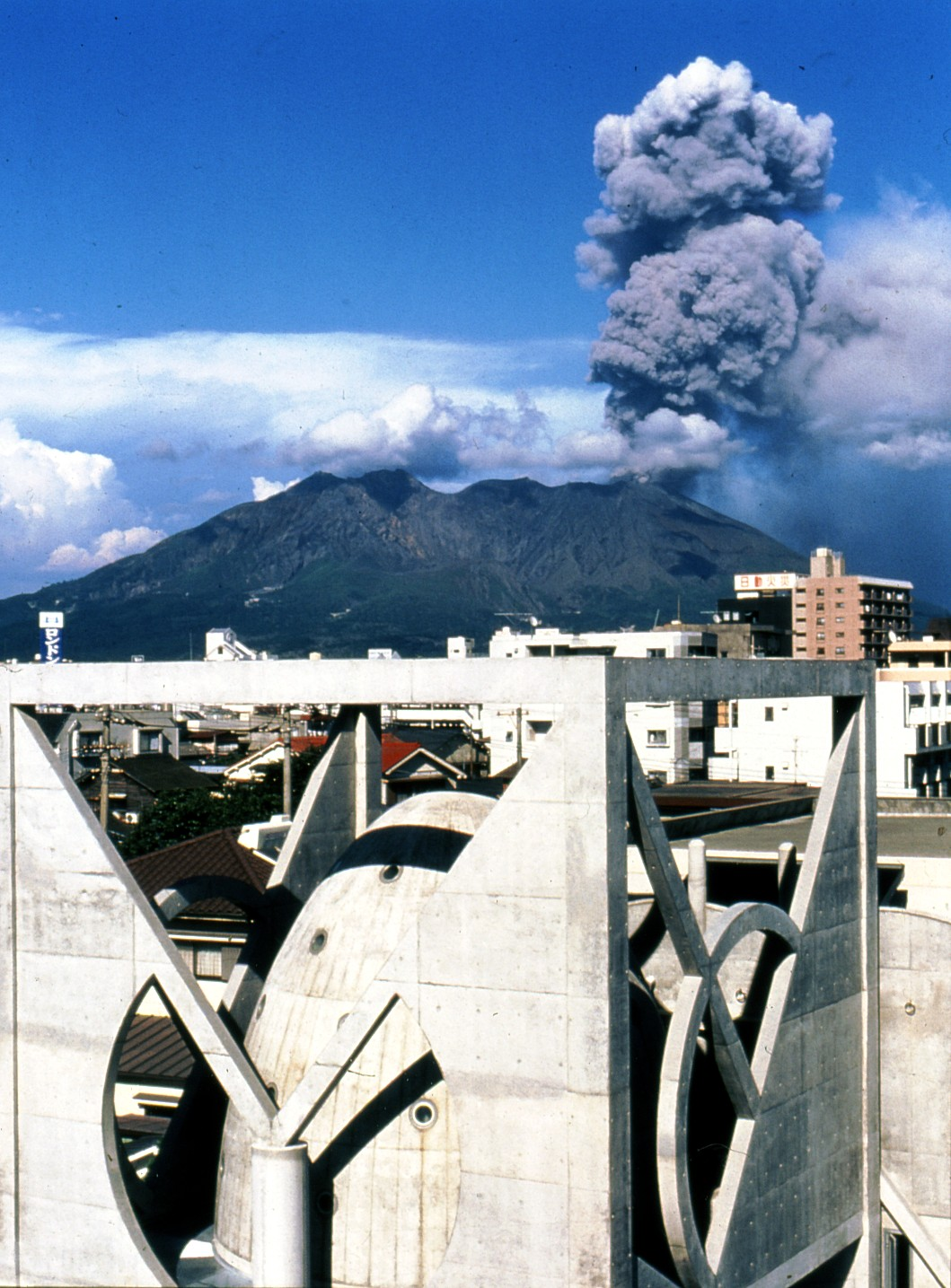
Zero House, Kagoshima, built in 1991

== Heisei period ==
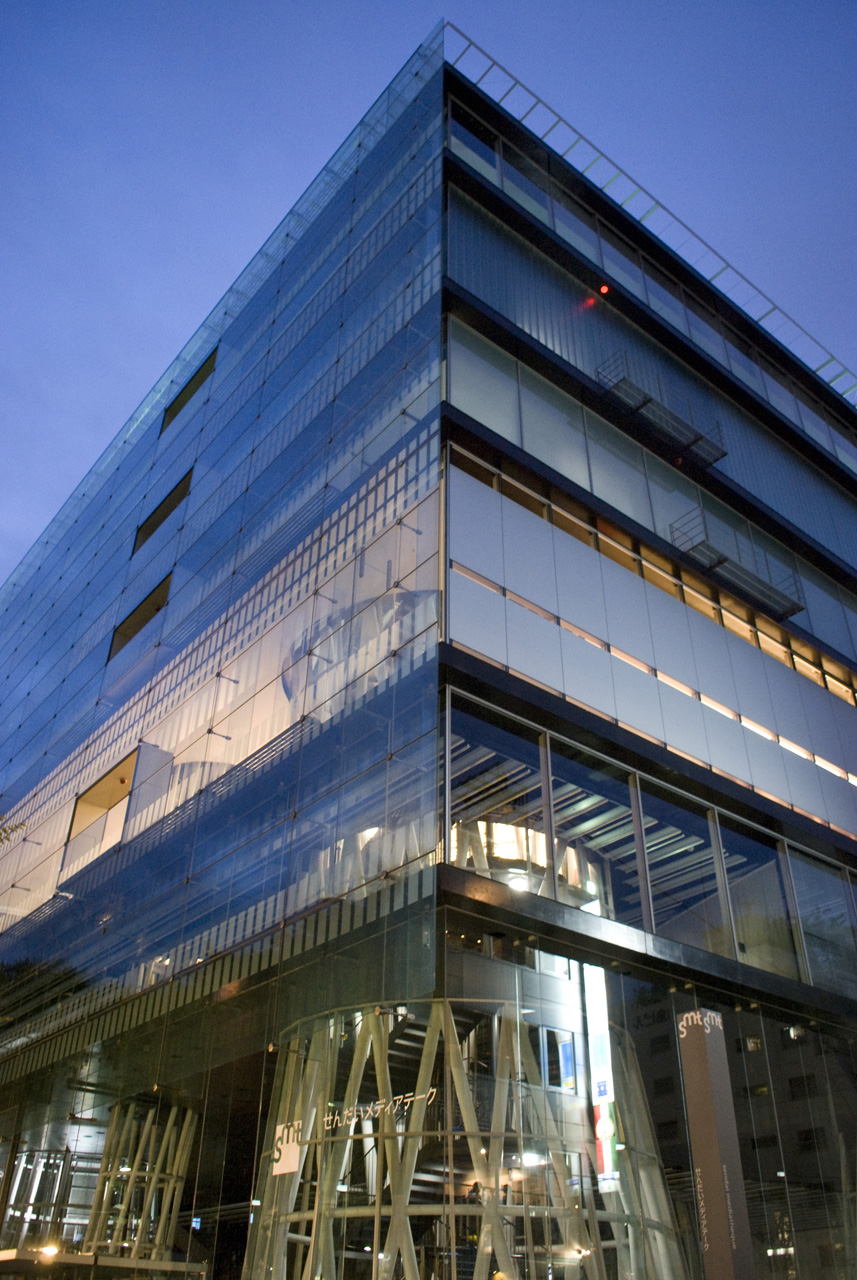
Sendai Mediatheque, Sendai, 2001

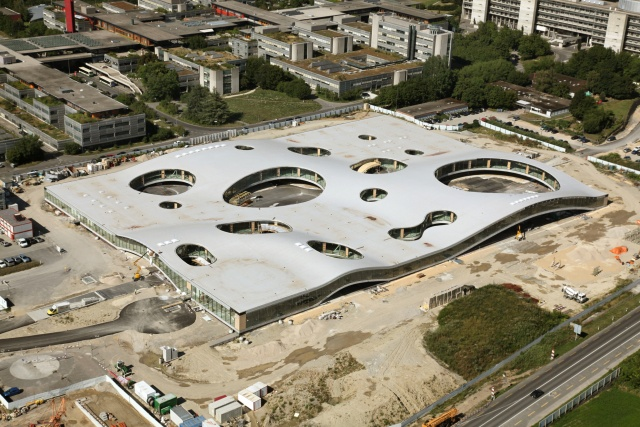
Rolex Learning Centre, Lausanne, 2010

The Heisei period began with the collapse of the so-called "bubble economy" that had previously boosted Japan's economy. Commissions for commercial works of architecture virtually dried up and architects relied upon government and prefectural organisations to provide projects.

Building on elements from the Shōnandai Culture Centre, Itsuko Hasegawa undertook a number cultural and community centres throughout Japan. These included the Sumida Cultural Centre (1995) and the Fukuroi Community Centre (2001) where she involved the public in the process of design whilst exploring her own ideas about the filtration of light through the external walls into the interior. In his 1995 competition win for Sendai Mediatheque, Toyō Itō continued his earlier thoughts about fluid dynamics within the modern city with "seaweed-like" columns supporting a seven-story building wrapped in glass. His work later in the period, for example, the library to Tama Art University in Tōkyō in 2007 demonstrates more expressive forms, rather than the engineered aesthetic of his earlier works.

Although Tadao Ando became well known for his use of concrete, he began the decade designing the Japanese pavilion at the Seville Exposition 1992, with a building that was hailed as "the largest wooden structure in the world". He continued with this medium in projects for the Museum of Wood Culture, Kami, Hyōgo Prefecture (1994) and the Komyo-ji Shrine in Saijo (2001).

The UK practice, Foreign Office Architects won an international competition in 1994 to design the Yokohama International Port Terminal. It is an undulating structure that emerges from the surrounding city and forms a building to walk over as well as into. Klein Dytham Architecture are one of a handful of foreign architects who managed to gain a strong foothold in Japan. Their design for Moku Moku Yu (literally "wood wood steam"), a communal bathhouse in Kobuchizawa, Yamanashi Prefecture in 2004 is a series of interconnected circular pools and changing rooms, flat-roofed and clad in coloured vertical timbers.

After the 1995 Kōbe earthquake, Shigeru Ban developed cardboard tubes that could be used to quickly construct refugee shelters that were dubbed "Paper Houses". Also as part of that relief effort he designed a church using 58 cardboard tubes that were 5m high and had a tensile roof that opened up like an umbrella. The church was erected by Roman Catholic volunteers in five weeks. For the Nomadic Museum, Ban used walls made of shipping containers, stacked four high and joined at the corners with twist connectors that produced a checkerboard effect of solid and void. The ancillary spaces were made with paper tubes and honeycomb panels. The museum was designed to be disassembled and it subsequently moved from New York, to Santa Monica, Tōkyō and Mexico.

Historian and architect Terunobu Fujimori's studies in the 1980s into so-called architectural curios found in the city inspired the work of a younger generation of architects such as the founders of Atelier Bow-Wow. Yoshiharu Tsukamoto and Momoyo Kajima surveyed the city for "no-good" architecture for their book Made in Tokyo in 2001. Their work in turn seeks to embrace its context rather than block it out. Although their office in Tōkyō is on a tight site they have welcomed the city in with huge windows and spacious porches.

Sou Fujimoto's architecture relies upon a manipulation of basic building blocks to produce a geometric primitivism. His buildings are very sensitive to the topographical form of their context and include a series of houses as well as a children's home in Hokkaidō.

Two former employees of Toyō Itō, Kazuyo Sejima and Ryue Nishizawa formed a collaborative partnership in 1995 called SANAA. They are known for creating lightweight, transparent spaces that expose the fluidity and movement of their occupants. Their Dior store in Shibuya, Tōkyō, in 2001 was reminiscent of Itō's Mediatheque, with cool white acrylic sheets on the external facade that filter the light and partially reveal the store's contents. Their dynamic of fluidity is demonstrated by the Rolex Learning Centre at École Polytechnique Fédérale de Lausanne, completed in 2010. This building has an undulating floor plane set under a continuous concrete shell roof that was poured in one go over two days. The plan is like a biological cell punctuated with tables and courtyards alike. In 2009 they designed the Serpentine Gallery Pavilion in London that comprised a reflective, floating aluminium roof supported by slender columns.

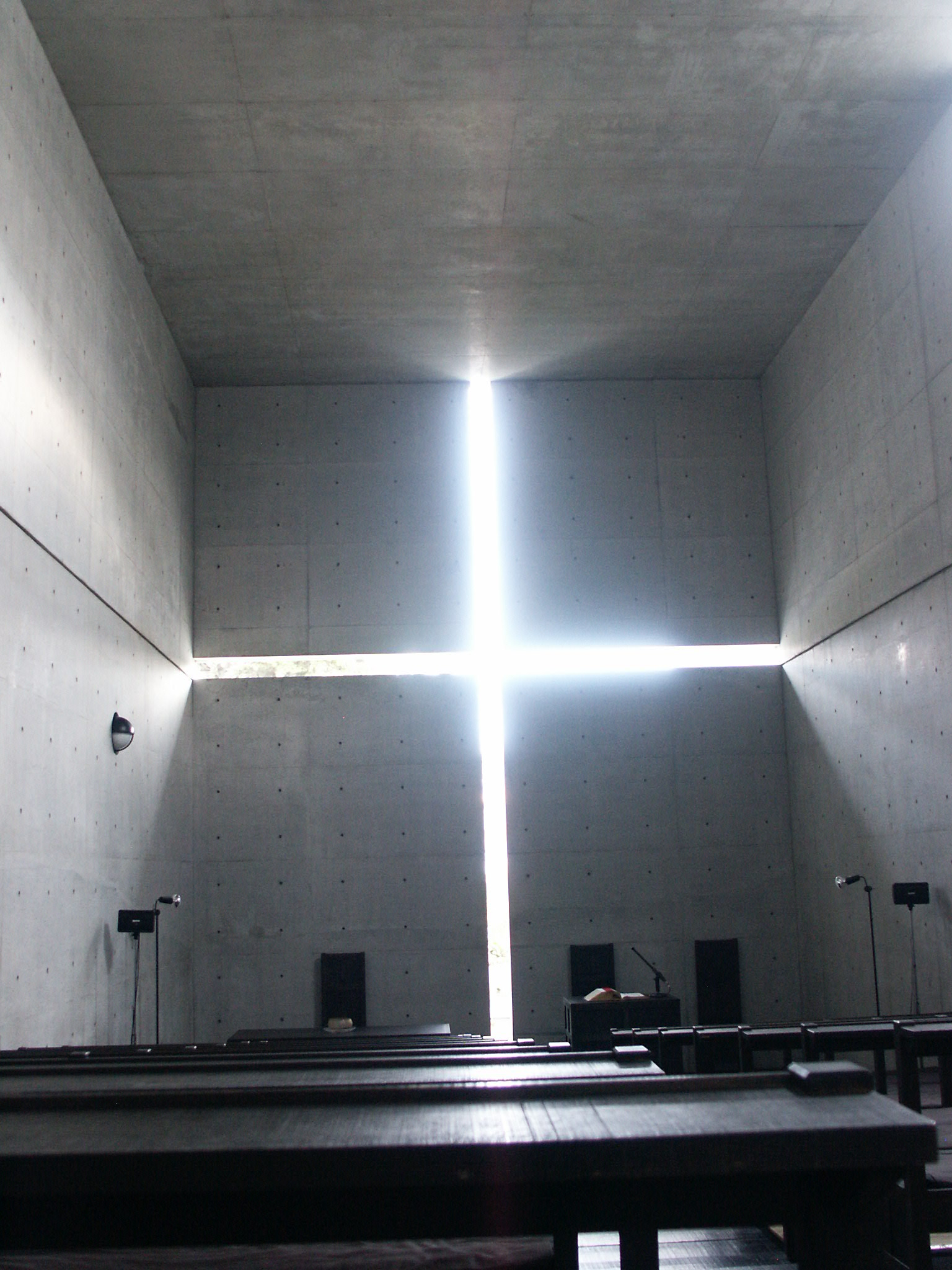
The Church of the Light, Ibaraki, Ōsaka, built in 1989

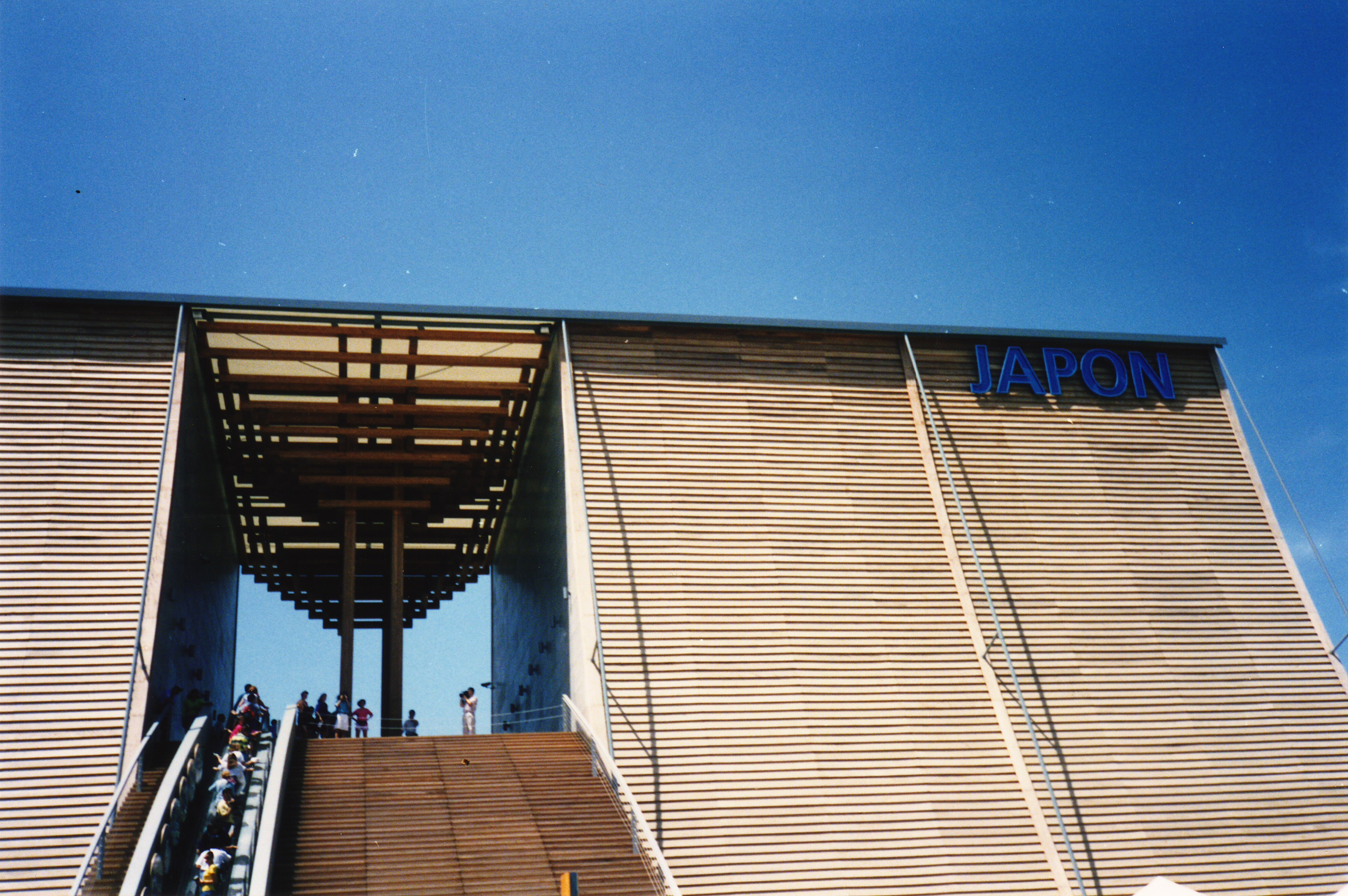
Japanese pavilion at the 1992 Seville Exposition
Built in 1992

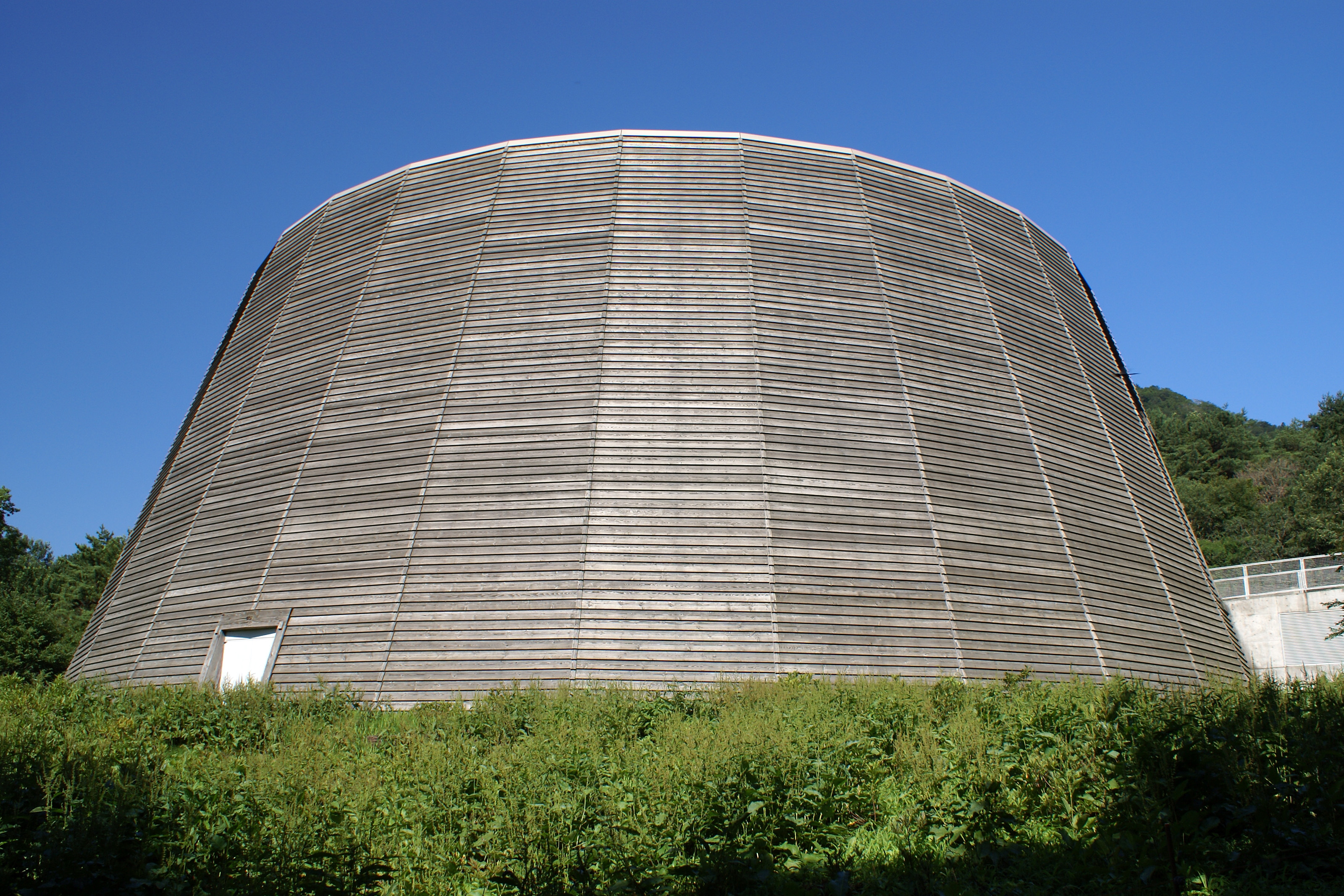
Museum for Wood Culture, Kami, Hyogo Prefecture
Built in 1994

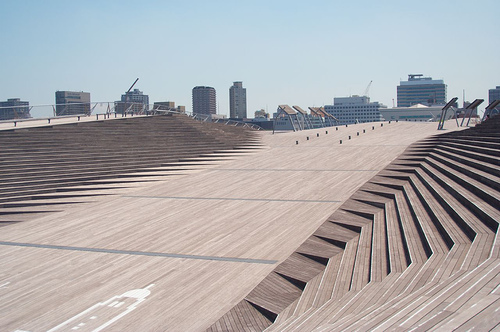
Yokohama International Port Terminal
Built between 1994 and 2002

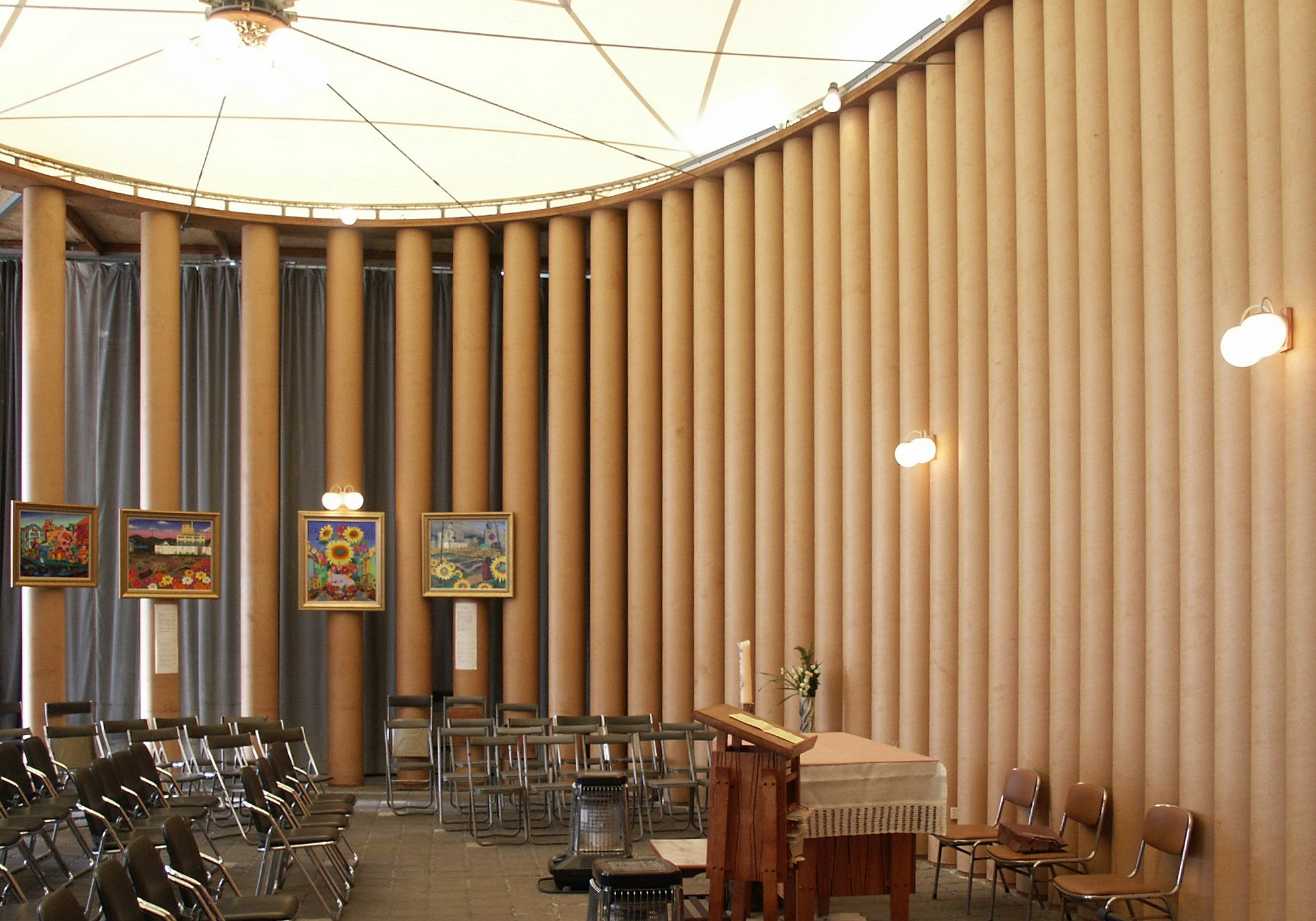
Paper Church, Kōbe
Built in 1995

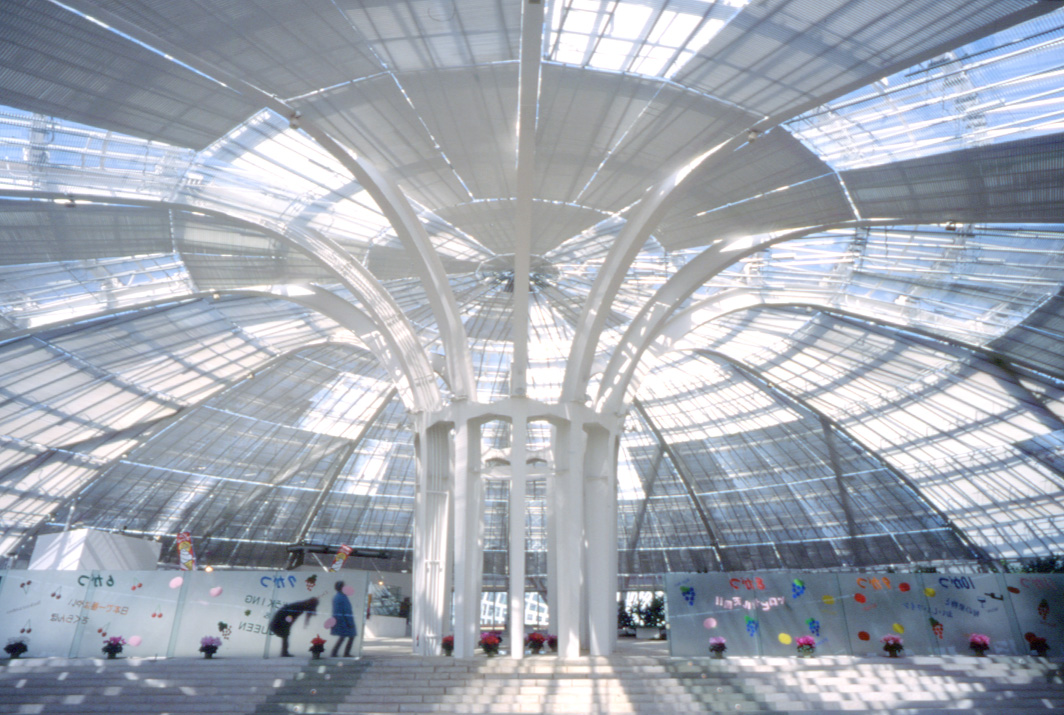
Yamanashi Fruit Museum
Built in 1996

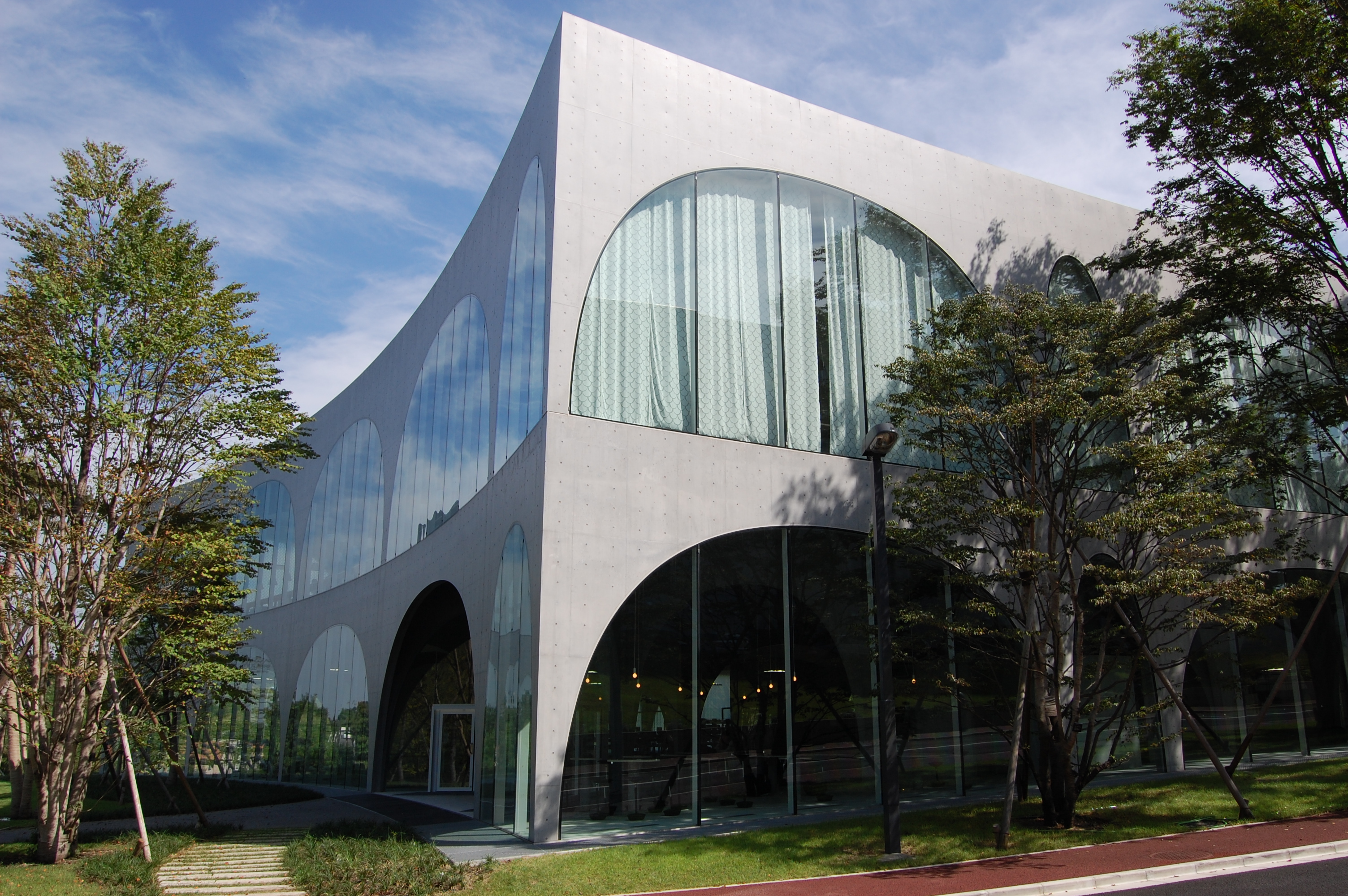
Tama Art University Library, Tōkyō
Built in 2007

== Japanese interior design ==
Japanese interior design has a unique aesthetic derived from Shinto, Taoism, Zen Buddhism, world view of wabi-sabi, specific religious figures and the West. This aesthetic has in turn influenced Western style, particularly Modernism.

=== Traditional Japanese aesthetic ===
What is generally identified as the Japanese aesthetic stems from ideals of Japanese Shinto and Chinese Taoism. Japanese culture is extremely diverse; despite this, in terms of the interior, the aesthetic is one of simplicity and minimalism.

The specific idea that a room's true beauty is in the empty space within the roof and walls came from Laozi, a philosopher and the founder of Taoism, who held to the "aesthetic ideal of emptiness", believing that the mood should be captured in the imagination, and not so heavily dictated by what is physically present. Japanese design is based strongly on craftsmanship, beauty, elaboration, and delicacy. The design of interiors is very simple but made with attention to detail and intricacy. This sense of intricacy and simplicity in Japanese designs is still valued in modern Japan as it was in traditional Japan.

Interiors are very simple, highlighting minimal and natural decoration. Traditional Japanese interiors, as well as modern, incorporate mainly natural materials including fine woods, bamboo, silk, rice straw mats, and paper shōji screens. Natural materials are used to keep simplicity in the space that connects to nature. Natural color schemes are used and neutral palettes including black, white, off-white, gray, and brown.

Impermanence is a strong theme in traditional Japanese dwellings. The size of rooms can be altered by interior sliding walls or screens, the already mentioned shōji. Cupboards built smoothly into the wall hide futon, mattresses pulled out before going to bed, allowing more space to be available during the day. The versatility of these dwellings becomes more apparent with changes of seasons. In summer, for example, exterior walls can be opened to bring the garden and cooling breezes in. The minimal decoration also alters seasonally, with a different scroll hanging or new flower arrangement.

The Japanese aesthetic developed further with the celebration of imperfection and insufficiency, characteristics resulting from the natural ageing process or darkening effect. Shinto, the indigenous religious tradition of Japan, provides a basis for the appreciation of these qualities, holding to a philosophy of appreciation of life and the world. Sei Shōnagon was a trend-setting court lady of the tenth century who wrote in 'The Pillow Book' of her dislike for "a new cloth screen with a colourful and cluttered painting of many cherry blossoms", preferring instead to notice "that one's elegant Chinese mirror has become a little cloudy". Her taste was not out of place in the ancient Japanese court. In the twelfth century a Buddhist monk, Yoshida Kenkō, exerted his influence on Japanese aesthetic sensibility resulting from his philosophy of life. He asked, "Are we to look at cherry blossoms only in full bloom, the moon only when it is cloudless? ...Branches about to blossom or garden strewn with faded flowers are worthier of our admiration." The incomplete is also praised by Kenkō, "uniformity and completeness are undesirable". Underpinning or complementing these aesthetic ideals, is the valuing of contrast; when imperfection or the impoverished is contrasted with perfection or opulence, each is emphasised and thus better appreciated.

=== Traditional materials of the interior ===
Japanese interior design is very efficient in the use of resources. Traditional and modern Japanese interiors have been flexible in use and designed mostly with natural materials. The spaces are used as multifunctional rooms. The rooms can be opened to create more space for a particular occasion or for more privacy, or vice versa closed-off by pulling closed paper screens called shōji.

Japanese Zen interior designs draw inspiration from elements of nature as they have immense respect for nature. Their designs have a strong connection with natural elements such as wood, plants, natural lighting and more.

A large portion of Japanese interior walls are often made of shōji screens that can be pushed open to join two rooms together, and then close them allowing more privacy. The shōji screens are made of paper attached to thin wooden frames that roll away on a track when they are pushed. Another important feature of the shōji screen, besides privacy and seclusion, is that they allow light through. This is an important aspect to Japanese design. Paper translucent walls allow light to be diffused through the space and create light shadows and patterns.

Tatami mats are rice straw floor mats often used to cover the floor in Japan's interiors; in modern Japanese houses there are usually only one or two tatami rooms. Another way to connect rooms in Japan's interiors is through sliding panels made of wood and paper, like the shōji screens, or cloth. These panels are called fusuma and are used as an entire wall. They are traditionally hand painted.

Tatami are the basis of traditional Japanese architecture, regulating a building's size and dimensions. They originated in ancient Japan when straw was laid on bare earth as a softener and warmer. In the Heian period (794–1185), this idea developed into moveable mats that could be laid anywhere in the house to sit or sleep on before becoming a permanent floor covering in the fifteenth century. Tatami are suitable for the Japanese climate because they let air circulate around the floor.

Bamboo is prominently used and even expected in the Japanese house, used both for decorative and functional purposes. Bamboo blinds, sudare, replace shoji in summer to prevent excess heat inside and also offer greater ventilation. Country dwellings and farmhouses often use it for ceilings and rafters. The natural properties of bamboo, its raw beauty with the knots and smooth surface, correspond to Japanese aesthetic ideals of imperfection, contrast and the natural.

The use of paper, or washi, in Japanese buildings is a main component in the beauty and atmosphere of the Japanese interior, the way variation of shadow combines to create a "mystery of shadows". A range of papers are used for various purposes in the home.

Wood is generally used for the framework of the home, but its properties are valuable in the Japanese aesthetic, namely its warmth and irregularity.

A recessed space called tokonoma is often present in traditional as well as modern Japanese living rooms. This is the focus of the room and displays Japanese art, usually a painting or calligraphy.

=== Western influence ===
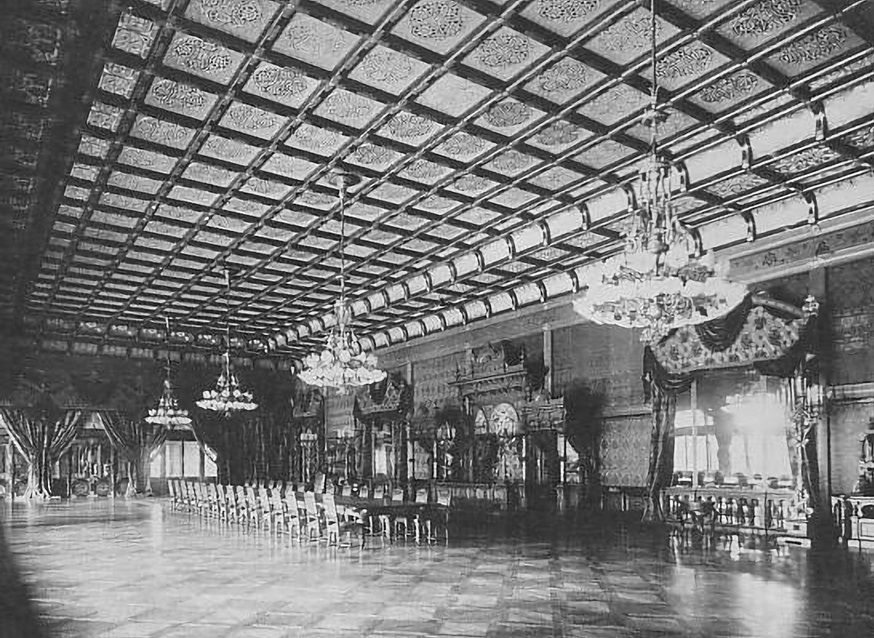
The Hōmei-Den of the Meiji era Tokyo Imperial Palace

After the Meiji Restoration of 1868, Japan's relations to Euro-American powers became more prominent and involved. This spilled into a broader interacting with the modern world, which in terms of interior design, resulted in the introduction of western style interiors, while the vernacular style came to be more associated with tradition and the past. The typical interiors found in Japanese homes and western homes in the late nineteenth and early twentieth centuries were vastly different with almost opposing attitudes to furniture, versatility of space and materials.

Many public spaces had begun to incorporate chairs and desks by the late nineteenth century, department stores adopted western-style displays; a new "urban visual and consumer culture" was emerging. In the domestic sphere, the manner and dress of inhabitants were determined by the interior style, Japanese or Western. One of the examples is the Hōmei-Den of the Meiji era Tokyo Imperial Palace, which fused Japanese styles such as the coffered ceiling with western parquet floor and chandeliers.

There was a push by bureaucrats for Japan to develop into a more "modern" (Western) culture. The modernising of the home was considered the best way to change the daily life of the people. Much of the reason for modernisation was a desire to "present a 'civilised' face to the world, thus helping to secure Japan's position as a modern nation in the world order". Even with governmental encouragement to transform the home, the majority of Japanese people still lived in fairly traditional style dwellings well into the 1920s, partly due to economic situation in the early 1910s that meant western style was out of reach for the majority of people. It was also difficult to incorporate furniture into traditional dwellings due to their small size and intended flexible use of space, a flexibility made difficult to maintain when bulky furniture was involved; it was impractical, but aesthetically incongruent too.

=== Influence on the West ===
Some of the earliest influence on the West came in the form of Japanese art, which gained popularity in Europe in particular, in the latter part of the nineteenth century. In terms of architecture and interior design though, the influence on the West is much more centered on the United States of America.

Before the twentieth century, very little of the West's knowledge of the Japanese building was gained in Japan. Instead it was gained through exhibitions the Japanese partook in such as the 1876 Centennial International Exhibition in Philadelphia. The early influence of such exhibitions was more in the creation of an enthusiasm for things Japanese instead of something more authentic. The result was exuberant Japanese decoration, the simplicity of Japanese design lost in the clutter of Victorian ostentation.

During the twentieth century though, a number of now renowned architects visited Japan including Frank Lloyd Wright, Ralph Adams Cram, Richard Neutra and Antonin Raymond. These architects, among others, played significant roles in bringing the Japanese influence to Western modernism. Influence from the Far East was not new in America at this time. During the eighteenth and a large part of the nineteenth centuries, a taste for Chinese art and architecture existed and often resulted in a "superficial copying". The Japanese influence was different however. The modernist context, and the time leading up to it, meant that architects were more concerned with "the problem of building, rather than in the art of ornamenting". The simplicity of Japanese dwellings contrasted the oft-esteemed excessive decoration of the West. The influence of Japanese design was thus not so much that it was directly copied but rather, "the west discovered the quality of space in traditional Japanese architecture through a filter of western architectural values". The culture that created traditional Japanese architecture is so far removed from Western values philosophies of life that it could not be directly applied in a design context.

== See also ==
- Shinto architecture
- Japanese Buddhist architecture
- Japanese-Western Eclectic Architecture
- Japanese garden
- Architecture of Tokyo
- List of Japanese architects
- Architectural forgery in Japan
- Housing in Japan
- Giboshi

== Bibliography ==
- Bognar, Botond (1995). The Japan Guide. Princeton Architectural Press. ISBN 1-878271-33-4.
- Bussagli, Mario (1989). History of World Architecture – Oriental Architecture/2. Faber and Faber. ISBN 0-571-15378-X.
- Bowring, R. and Kornicki, P. (1993), The Cambridge Encyclopedia of Japan, pp. 201–208, Cambridge University Press, ISBN 0-521-40352-9.
- Coaldrake, William H. (1996) Architecture and Authority in Japan's hero (Nissan Institute/Routledge Japanese Studies Series), Routledge, ISBN 978-0-415-10601-6
- Daniell, Thomas (2008) After the Crash: Architecture in Post-Bubble Japan, Princeton Architectural Press, ISBN 978-1-56898-776-7
- Diefendorf, Jeffry M; Hein, Carola; Yorifusa, Ishida, eds. (2003). Rebuilding Urban Japan After 1945. Hampshire, United Kingdom: Palgrave MacMillan. ISBN 0-333-65962-7.
- Fiévé, Nicolas (1996).L'architecture et la ville du Japon ancien. Espace architectural de la ville de Kyôto et des résidences shôgunales aux XIVe et XVe siècles, Bibliothèque de l'Institut des Hautes Études Japonaises, Collège de France, Paris, Maisonneuve & Larose, 358 pages + 102 illustrations. ISBN 2-7068-1131-5.
- Fiévé, Nicolas (dir.) (2008).Atlas historique de Kyôto. Analyse spatiale des systèmes de mémoire d'une ville, de son architecture et de ses paysages urbains. Foreword Kôichirô Matsuura, Preface Jacques Gernet, Paris, Éditions de l'UNESCO / Éditions de l'Amateur, 528 pages, 207 maps et 210 ill. ISBN 978-2-85917-486-6.
- Fiévé, Nicolas and Waley, Paul. (2003). Japanese Capitals in Historical Perspective: Place, Power and Memory in Kyoto, Edo and Tokyo. London: Routledge. 417 pages + 75 ill. ISBN 978-0-7007-1409-4
- Frampton, Kenneth (1990). Modern Architecture a Critical History. Thames and Hudson.
- Gotō, Osamu (2003). Nihon Kenchikushi. Kyoritsu Shuppan.
- Gregory, Rob, August 2007, "Reading Matter", Architectural Review
- Gregory, Rob, August 2007, "Rock Solid", Architectural Review
- Itoh, Teiji (1973). Kura – Design and Tradition of the Japanese Storehouse. Kodansha International. ISBN 0-914842-53-6.
- Mitchelhill, Jennifer (2013). Castles of the Samurai:Power & Beauty. USA: Kodansha. ISBN 978-1568365121.
- Nishi, Kazuo; Hozumi, Kazuo (1996) [1983]. What is Japanese architecture? (illustrated ed.). Kodansha International. ISBN 4-7700-1992-0.
- Payne, James, March 2010, "Lausanne", Architecture Today
- Reynolds, Jonathan M. (2001). Maekawa Kunio and the Emergence of Japanese Modernist Architecture. University of California Press. ISBN 0-520-21495-1.
- Sickman & Soper, Laurence & Alexander (1956). The Art and Architecture of China. Penguin Books.
- Slessor, Catherine, October 2001, "Comment", Architectural Review
- Slessor, Catherine, October 2001, "Common Ground", Architectural Review
- Stewart, David B (2002). The Making of a Modern Japanese Architecture, From the Founders to Shinohara and Isozaki. Kodansha International.
- Sumner, Yuki; Pollock, Naomi (2010). New Architecture in Japan. London: Merrell. ISBN 978-1-85894-450-0.
- Takasaki, Masaharu (1998). An Architecture of Cosmology. Princeton Architectural Press.
- Tanigawa, Masami (2008). Yamamura House – Yodoko Guest House. Banana Books.
- Thompson, Jessica Cargill (2000). 40 architects under 40. Taschen. ISBN 3-8228-6212-6.
- Legault, Réjean; Goldhagen, Sarah, eds. (2000). Anxious Modernisms. Cambridge, Massachusetts: The MIT Press. ISBN 0-262-07208-4.
- Webb, Michael, October 2001, "Layered Media", Architectural Review
- Webb, Michael, May 2006, "Container Art", Architectural Review
- Spring 2005, "Do_co,mo.mo Japan: the 100 selection", The Japan Architect, No. 57
- Fletcher, Banister; Cruickshank, Dan, Sir Banister Fletcher's a History of Architecture, Architectural Press, 20th edition, 1996 (first published 1896). ISBN 0-7506-2267-9. Cf. Part Four, Chapter 25
- Koji Yagi (text), Ryo Hata (photos): A Japanese Touch For Your Home. Kodansha International, Tokyo, New York, London 1999 (Pbck.), ISBN 4-7700-1662-X
