= Osari Nakaakira =

- 長利 仲聴
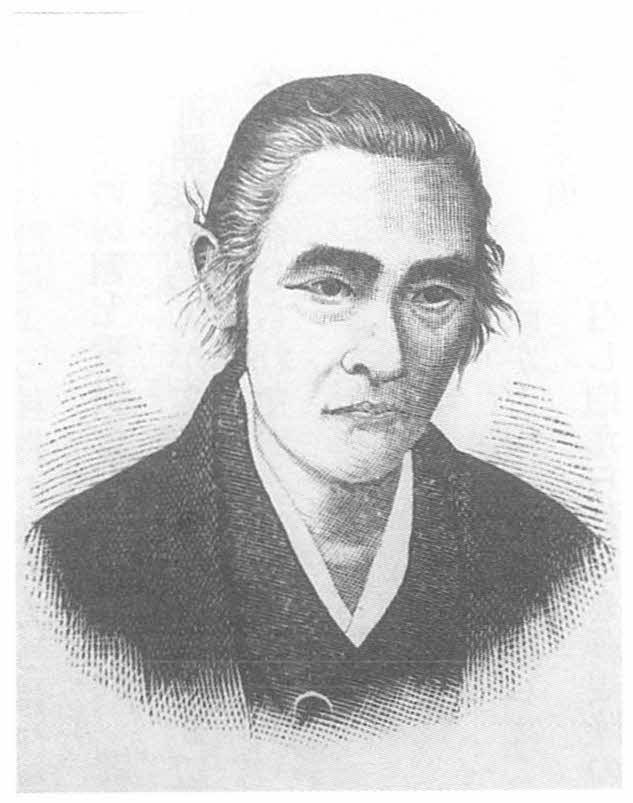

Personal details
- Born: October 28, 1823 Tsugaru Domain, Mutsu Province, Japan
- Died: April 22, 1903 (aged 79) Hirosaki, Aomori Prefecture, Japan

Osari Nakaakira (長利 仲聴; 1823–1903) was a Japanese samurai, kannushi, student of kokugaku, and retainer of the Tsugaru clan. In 1851, he was given the courtesy title of Satsuma-no-kami (薩摩守). He was the grandfather of Kon Wajirō.

== Biography ==
Osari Nakaakira's family had been Shinto priests for many generations. When he was young, he studied for the priesthood under Abe Nakaaki (阿部 仲昌), priest of the Iwakiyama Shrine, and Saitō Norioki (齋藤 規冲) an instructor from the Keikokan (稽古館), Tsugaru Domain's han school. Osari eventually served as high priest of Kumano-Okuteru Shrine (熊野奥照神社) and later also Iwakiyama Shrine.

Osari was renowned as one of Tsugaru's greatest poets, and taught poetry to many students including Hirao Rosen and Shimozawa Yasumi.

In the summer of 1869, Tsugaru Tsuguakira arranged for a shōkon funeral for Tsugaru soldiers who died in the battles of Noheji and Hakodate. Osari directed the funeral ceremonies. Tens of thousands of people attended the ceremony, which included a British-style gun salute and drill by the nascent Imperial Japanese Army.

Later that year, Osari was brought on by the Keikokan as an instructor of classical studies and became a leader of the domain's efforts to eliminate the confounding of Shintō and Buddhism. He was also involved in founding the predecessor of the Aomori Gokoku Shrine for Japanese war dead. Later he traveled to Kyoto to study under Hirata Kanetane. Osari himself taught hundreds of students.

In 1898, Osari held an event in memory of the Four Great Men of Kokugaku. Here Osari credited kokugaku scholars with opening the "Imperial Way" (皇道, kōdō) which allowed patriotism and the Yamato spirit to flourish:

Achieving total victory in the Sino-Japanese War and illuminating all countries with Imperial authority was attributable to [...] [their] awakening others to the significance of being the people of the Empire (皇国, kōkoku)

In 1902, on Osari's 79th birthday, 52 local poets presented him with a book of poetry titled Chitose no tomo (千歳の友). Osari died in 1903.
