= Tsugaru Tsuguyasu =

Japanese daimyō

Tsugaru Tsuguyasu 津軽承保
- Born: December 23, 1821
- Died: October 18, 1851 (aged 29)
- Other names: Tsugaru Masatari
- Occupation: Daimyō of Kuroishi Domain (1839–1851)
- Predecessor: Tsugaru Yukitsugu
- Successor: Tsugaru Tsugumichi
- Father: Tsugaru Chikatari

Tsugaru Tsuguyasu (津軽 承保; December 23, 1821 – October 18, 1851) was the 3rd daimyō of Kuroishi Domain in northern Mutsu Province, Honshū, Japan (modern-day Aomori Prefecture). His courtesy title was Izumo-no-kami, and his Court rank was Junior Fifth Rank, Lower Grade.

== Biography ==
Tsugaru Tsuguyasu was the 2nd son of Tsugaru Chikatari, the 1st daimyō of Kuroishi Domain and was originally named Tsugaru Masatari . He became daimyō in 1839, when his adoptive elder brother Tsugaru Yukitsugu was reassigned to take over the administration of Hirosaki Domain, changing his name to Tsugaru Tsuguyasu at that time.

Tsuguyasu inherited a domain stabilized by the reforms his brother had begun to implement, and had a stable reign through the difficult the political and agricultural crises of the Tenpō era. He died in 1851 at a relatively young age. His grave is at the clan temple of Shinryō-in (a subsidiary of Kan'ei-ji) in Taitō-ku, Tokyo.

== See also ==
- Tsugaru clan

Preceded by Tsugaru Yukitsugu	3rd Daimyō of Kuroishi; 1839–1851	Succeeded by Tsugaru Tsugumichi
