= Tsugaru Nobuyuki =

Japanese Daimyo

Tsugaru Nobuyuki 津軽信順
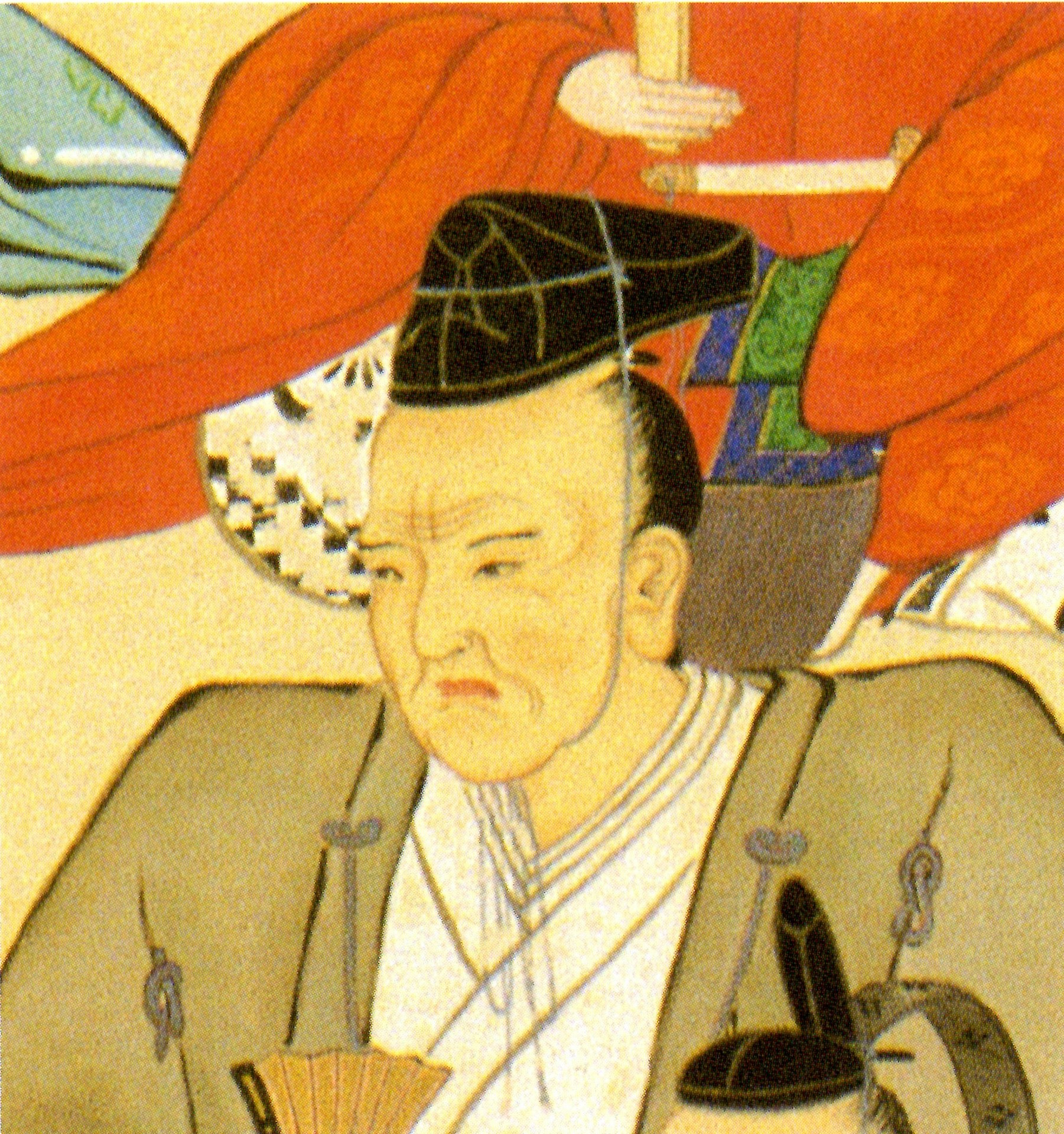
- Tsugaru Nobuyuki
- Born: April 18, 1800
- Died: December 5, 1862 (aged 62); Edo, Japan
- Occupation: Daimyō of Hirosaki Domain (1825–1839)
- Predecessor: Tsugaru Yasuchika
- Successor: Tsugaru Yukitsugu
- Spouse(s): daughter of Konoe Motosaki sixth daughter of Tokugawa Narimasa ninth daughter of Tokugawa Narimasa
- Father: Tsugaru Yasuchika

Tsugaru Nobuyuki (津軽 信順; April 18, 1800 – December 5, 1862) was the 10th daimyō of Hirosaki Domain in northern Mutsu Province, Honshū, Japan (modern-day Aomori Prefecture). His courtesy title was Dewa-no-kami, to which was later added title Jujū, and his court rank was Junior Fourth Rank, Lower Grade.

== Biography ==
Tsugaru Nobuyuki was the younger son of Tsugaru Yasuchika, the 9th daimyō of Hirosaki Domain. Yasuchika was originally a hatamoto ruling a 4000 koku fief at Kuroishi before he was adopted into the main Tsugaru clan line to become daimyō of Hirosaki. At that time, he turned Kuroishi over to his eldest son, and later elevated the holding to Kuroishi Domain. Yasuchika initially attempted to continue implementation many of the reforms initiated from the time of Tsugaru Nobuakira to restore prosperity to the disaster-prone domain, but faced stubborn opposition due to vested interests and extensive corruption issues with his retainers. Nobuyuki was appointed heir to Hirosaki, and was received by shōgun Tokugawa Ienari in formal audience in 1811. He made his first visit to Hirosaki in 1812.

Yasuchika enjoyed good relations with the Tokugawa shogunate and in 1811 was successful in arranging an extremely favorable marriage for Nobuyuki to the daughter of Konoe Motosaki, of the Kyoto court nobility. The bride died two years later, and Yasuchika then arranged a new marriage for Nobuyuki with the sixth daughter of Tokugawa Narimasa, head of the Tayasu-branch of the Tokugawa clan and sister of the Shogun. She also died in 1820, and a third marriage was then arranged between Nobuyuki and the ninth daughter of Tokugawa Narimasa in 1822. The financial outlay to the Court and to the Shogunate in exchange for these marriages was tremendous, amounting to many hundreds of thousands of ryō. Increased taxation led to peasant uprisings. In 1821 samurai of the Tsugaru clan's arch-rivals, the Nanbu clan of Morioka Domain attempted to assassinate Yasuchika during the Sōma Daisaku Incident, and in 1825 Yasuchika retired, and turned the domain over to Nobuyuki.

Yasuchika continued to rule behind the scenes from the clan's Edo residence, and lacking a personal power base or the respect of his senior retainers, Nobuyuki was reduced to an ineffectual figurehead, and was derided as the "Idiot Lord" (馬鹿殿様, Baka-tonosama) of Tsugaru. Rumors were spread of his laziness, lack of mental acuity, drunkenness, inappropriate behavior and lasciviousness during sankin-kōtai journeys to Edo. The shogunate was also outraged by reports that, despite the domain's desperate financial situation, Nobuyuki was spending profligately on entertainments such as parades, firework displays, festivals and moon-viewing parties, and that he had taken a commoner (the daughter of an Edo oil merchant) as his concubine.

Nobuyuki was forced into retirement in 1839, and the domain was turned over to an outsider, the 7th son of Matsudaira Nobuakira, lord of Yoshida Domain in Mikawa Province and a rōjū, who was adopted into the Tsugaru clan as Tsugaru Yukitsugu. Nobuyuki lived on to 1862, and died at the age of 63. His grave is at the clan temple of Shinryō-in (a subsidiary of Kan'ei-ji) in Taitō-ku, Tokyo.

== See also ==
- Tsugaru clan

Preceded by Tsugaru Yasuchika	10th Daimyō of Hirosaki; 1825–1839	Succeeded by Tsugaru Yukitsugu
