= Tsugaru Yukitsugu =

Japanese Daimyo

Tsugaru Yukitsugu 津軽順承
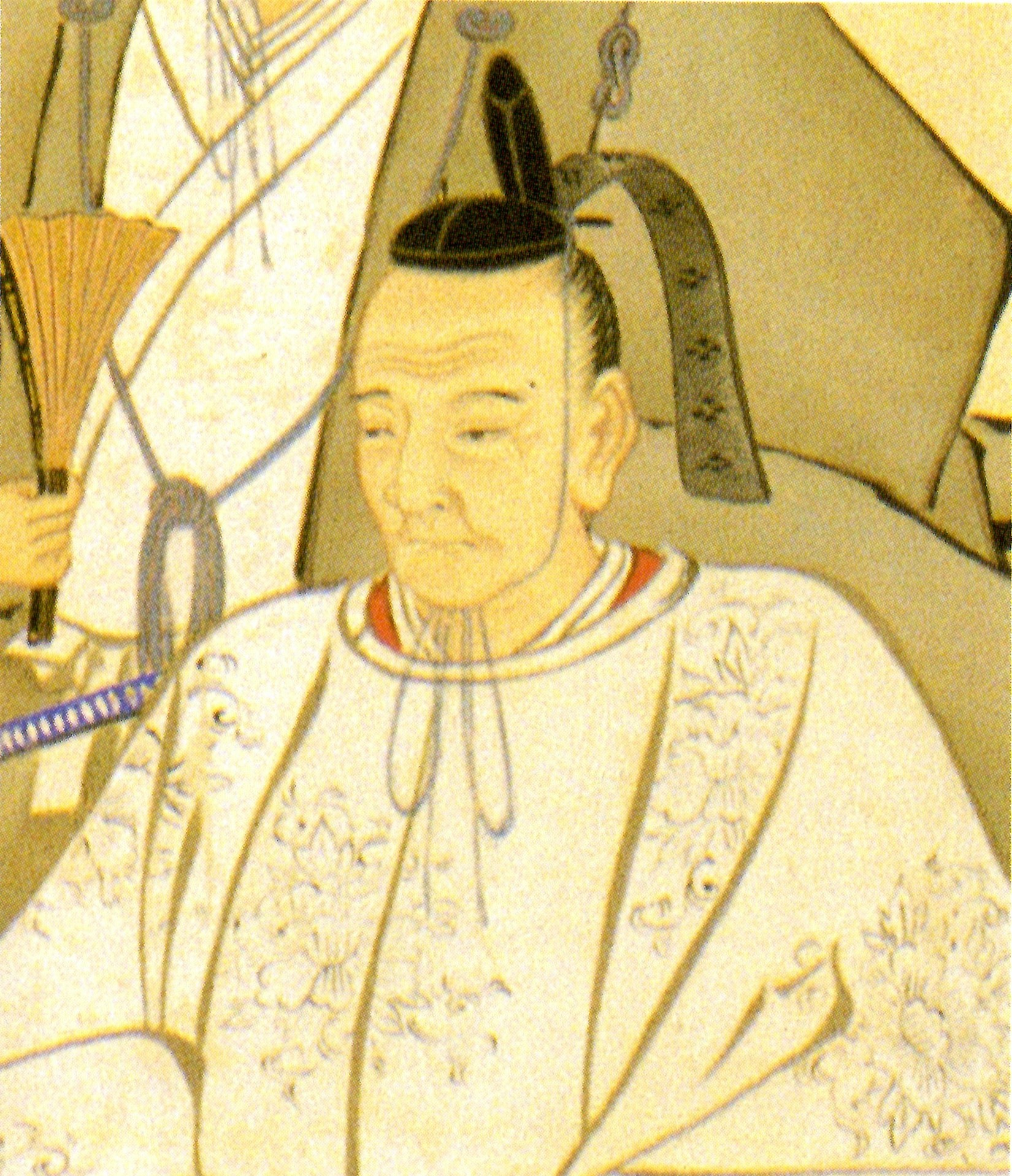
- Portrait of Tsugaru Yukitsugu
- Born: February 6, 1800
- Died: March 2, 1865 (aged 65); Edo, Japan
- Other names: Tsugaru Yukinori
- Occupations: Daimyō of Kuroishi Domain (1825–1839); Daimyō of Hirosaki Domain (1839–1859)
- Predecessor: Tsugaru Chikatari; Tsugaru Nobuyuki
- Successor: Tsugaru Tsuguakira
- Spouse(s): daughter of Arima Hisayasu, daimyō of Goi Domain
- Father: Matsudaira Nobuakira

Tsugaru Yukitsugu (津軽 順承; February 6, 1800 – March 2, 1865) was the 2nd daimyō of Kuroishi Domain, and later the 11th daimyō of Hirosaki Domain in northern Mutsu Province, Honshū, Japan (modern-day Aomori Prefecture). His courtesy title was Ōsumi-no-kami, and his Court rank was Junior Fourth Rank, Lower Grade.

== Biography ==
Tsugaru Yukitsugu was born as Matsudaira Yukinori, the 5th son of Matsudaira Nobuakira, the daimyō of Yoshida Domain in Mikawa Province. He was adopted on June 5, 1821, as the heir to Tsugaru Chikatari, the daimyō of Kuroishi Domain. On his adoptive father’s retirement, as Tsugaru Yukinori, he became the 2nd daimyō of Kuroishi Domain from 1825 to 1839. He was known as an intelligent ruler, and worked for the restoration of the domain's finances during the political and agricultural crisis of the Tenpō era. After the Tokugawa shogunate forced Tsugaru Nobuyuki of Hirosaki Domain into retirement over allegations of gross misrule, Yukinori was ordered to change his name to Tsugaru Yukitsugu and to take his place as the 11th daimyō of Hirosaki. He turned the rule of Kuroishi Domain over to his brother, Tsugaru Tsuguyasu.

Yukitsugu brought in the noted Confucian scholar Satō Issai as an advisor and attempted to continue implementation many of the reforms initiated by Tsugaru Nobuakira to restore prosperity to the disaster-prone domain, expanding on Nobuakira’s code of ethics from five articles to thirty in an attempt to rein in his unruly retainers. In addition to expanding the domain's agricultural land through opening of new paddy fields, Yukitsugu also established a foundry for the casting of cannons, and attempted to modernize the domain's military and medical levels through the introduction of rangaku studies. In 1855, the domain was ordered to assist in the defences of Ezo, and established a military outpost of what the now the city of Wakkanai.

In 1859 Yukitsugu turned the reign over to his adopted son, Tsugaru Tsuguakira, and retired to pursue studies in literature and waka poetry. He died at the clan's Edo residence in 1865. His grave is at the clan temple of Shinryō-in (a subsidiary of Kan'ei-ji) in Taitō-ku, Tokyo.

== See also ==
- Tsugaru clan

| Preceded by Tsugaru Chikatari | 2nd Daimyō of Kuroishi (as Tsugaru Yukinori); 1825–1839 | Succeeded by Tsugaru Tsuguyasu |
| Preceded by Tsugaru Nobuyuki | 11th Daimyō of Hirosaki; 1839–1859 | Succeeded by Tsugaru Tsuguakira |
