= Tsugaru Nobuyasu =

Tsugaru Nobuyasu 津軽信寧
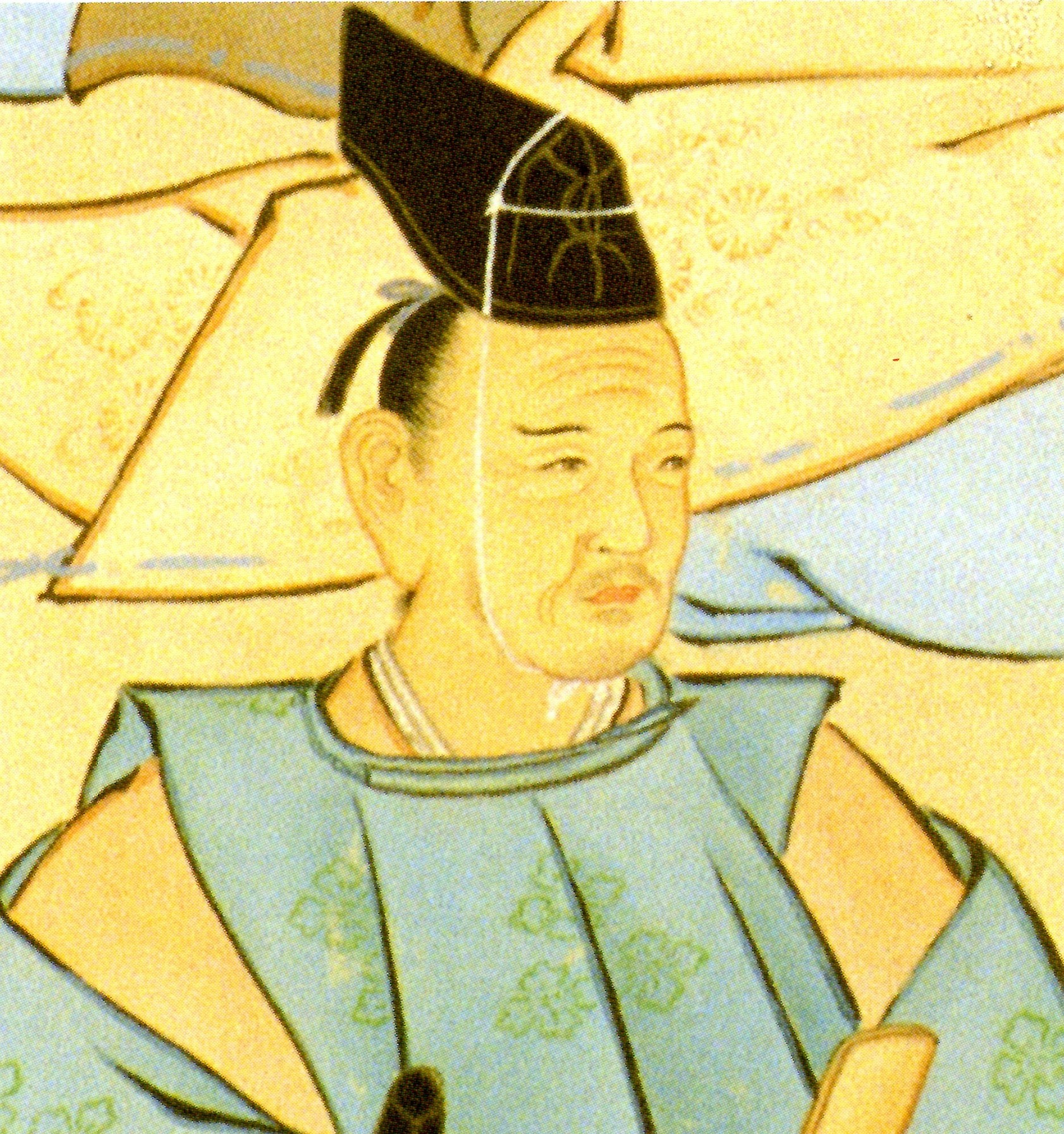
- Tsugaru Nobuyasu
- Born: April 5, 1739
- Died: February 22, 1784 (aged 44)
- Occupation: Daimyō of Hirosaki Domain (1744–1784)
- Predecessor: Tsugaru Nobuaki
- Successor: Tsugaru Nobuakira
- Spouse(s): daughter of Matsudaira Akinori, daimyō of Shirakawa Domain
- Father: Tsugaru Nobuaki

Tsugaru Nobuyasu (津軽 信寧; April 5, 1739 – February 22, 1784) was the 7th daimyō of Hirosaki Domain in northern Mutsu Province, Honshū, Japan (modern-day Aomori Prefecture). His courtesy title was Etchū-no-kami, and his Court rank was Junior Fifth Rank, Lower Grade.

== Biography ==
Tsugaru Nobuyasu was the eldest son of Tsugaru Nobuaki, the 6th daimyō of Hirosaki Domain. His father died when he was four years old, and all power remained in the hands his great-grandfather, Tsugaru Nobuhisa until 1746, and in the hands of the senior clan retainers until he came of age. He was received in formal audience by shōgun Tokugawa Ieshige in 1753.

Nobuyasu inherited a domain stricken by extensive famine caused by repeated natural disasters, with earthquakes and volcanic eruptions by Mount Iwaki, inclement weather, and repeated crop failures. The domain was 350,000 gold ryō in debt, and many of Nobuyasu's senior retainers were corrupt and contributed to the domain's problems. It was discovered that three senior retainers had conspired with merchants in Edo to sell of all of the domain's rice reserves for their personal profit, leaving the domain helpless in face of the Great Tenmei Famine of 1781, during which time thousands of people within the domain starved to death. Beset by problems on all sides, Nobuyasu died suddenly in 1784, leaving the domain and its problems to his only son, Nobuakira.

Nobuyasu had one son and three daughters. His grave is at the clan temple of Shinryō-in (a subsidiary of Kan'ei-ji) in Taitō-ku, Tokyo, as well as the Tsugaru clan temple of Chōshō-ji in Hirosaki.

== See also ==
- Tsugaru clan

Preceded by Tsugaru Nobuaki	7th Daimyō of Hirosaki; 1744–1784	Succeeded by Tsugaru Nobuakira
