= Hirao Rosen =

- 平尾 魯僊
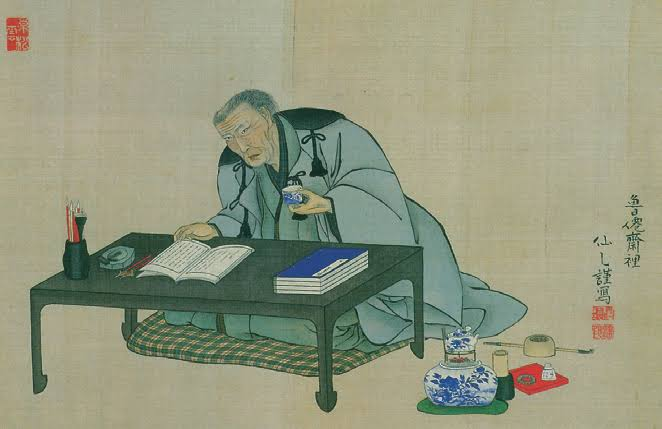

Personal details
- Born: October 21, 1808 Hirosaki, Tsugaru Domain, Mutsu Province, Japan
- Died: February 21, 1880 (aged 71) Hirosaki, Aomori Prefecture, Japan

Hirao Hatsusaburō Sukemune (Japanese: 平尾 初三郎 亮致; 1808–1880), better known as Hirao Rosen (平尾 魯僊), was a Japanese polymath, painter, ethnographer, folklorist, and student of the nationalist kokugaku school. He has been called "the da Vinci of Aomori" (青森のダ・ヴィンチ).

== Biography ==
Hirao Rosen was born to Hirao Tōjirō (平尾 藤二郎), the middle-class proprietor of the Obama-ya (小浜屋) fish wholesaler in Hirosaki castle town. At an early age he was recognized as a child prodigy, having a natural talent for painting coupled with an eidetic memory. He studied the art of painting with Kudō Gohō (工藤 五鳳) and Imamura Keiju (今村 渓寿) of the Kanō school among others, and researched the techniques of the Chinese-style artist Sō Shihō (宋 紫峯). He later studied poetry with the Shintō priest Osari Nakaakira.

In his youth, Hirao was ridiculed as a "sennin" (僊人) for his eccentricities. He gave himself the name "Rosen" by adding ro (魯; lit. 'foolish') to the sen of sennin.

In 1855, Hirao sailed to Matsumae and traveled overland across the Oshima Peninsula to Hakodate in order to survey the situation in the Matsumae Domain and Ezo. Hakodate had recently been opened to foreign commerce under the terms of the coercive unequal treaties, and Hirao encountered many Westerners during his stay in the town. He made a number of sketches in Hakodate, including one of the Japanese army encampment at Chiyogadai (千代台). Hirao published accounts of his visit to Ezo under the titles Hakodate kikō (函館紀行; Hakodate Travelogue) and Yō'i meiwa (洋夷茗話; A Talk Over Tea About Western Barbarians).

Hirao was a disciple of Hirata Atsutane, and in his writings he severely criticized Confucian theories on the non-existence of the soul. His primary works on local folklore were Gappo kidan (合浦奇談; Strange Tales of Gappo) (completed 1855) and Tani no hibiki (谷の響; Echoes of the Valley) (completed 1860).

In Hirao's magnum opus, the 8-volume Yūfu shinron (幽府新論; A New Theory on the Dark Realm) with 14 supplementary volumes, he elaborated on Atsutane's theory of a physical overlap between the world of the living and the world of the dead (幽り世, kakuriyo). The complete manuscript of Yūfu shinron was eventually sent to Atsutane's successor Hirata Kanetane. Kanetane's son Hirata Nobutane gave the manuscript an endorsement, but it was ultimately never published.

Hirao entirely rejected Western culture, and he became increasingly depressed and apathetic as society Westernized around him throughout the early Meiji era. He eventually built a schoolhouse in his backyard and gave lessons to neighborhood boys and girls. At one point, Hirao's granddaughter was moved to tears by his recounting of how, in the 14th century, the treachery of Ashikaga Takauji brought down the Kenmu Restoration. Hirao reportedly said, quoting the words of Kitabatake Chikafusa in the opening lines of the Jinnō Shōtōki:

[...] [This history] is not merely a matter of the past. It is something noble, upheld even now through painstaking effort. Japan is the land of the kami (神国). The heavenly ancestor it was who first laid its foundations, and the Sun Goddess left her descendants to reign over it for ever. This is true only of our country, and nothing similar may be found in foreign lands. That is why it is called the land of the kami.

Hirao died in 1880.

== Quotes ==
たまちはう
たかみむすびの
かみわざは
たえにくすびに
ぎよたらわして
ゆうにいわれず

— Hirao Rosen, written after examining objects with a microscope
Translation:

The works of
the noble spirit
Takamimusubi
are so awesome and mysterious
they can never be described
with words

— Translation

== See also ==
- Tanaka Ōhide
