= Tsugaru Nobuaki =

Tsugaru Nobuaki 津軽信著
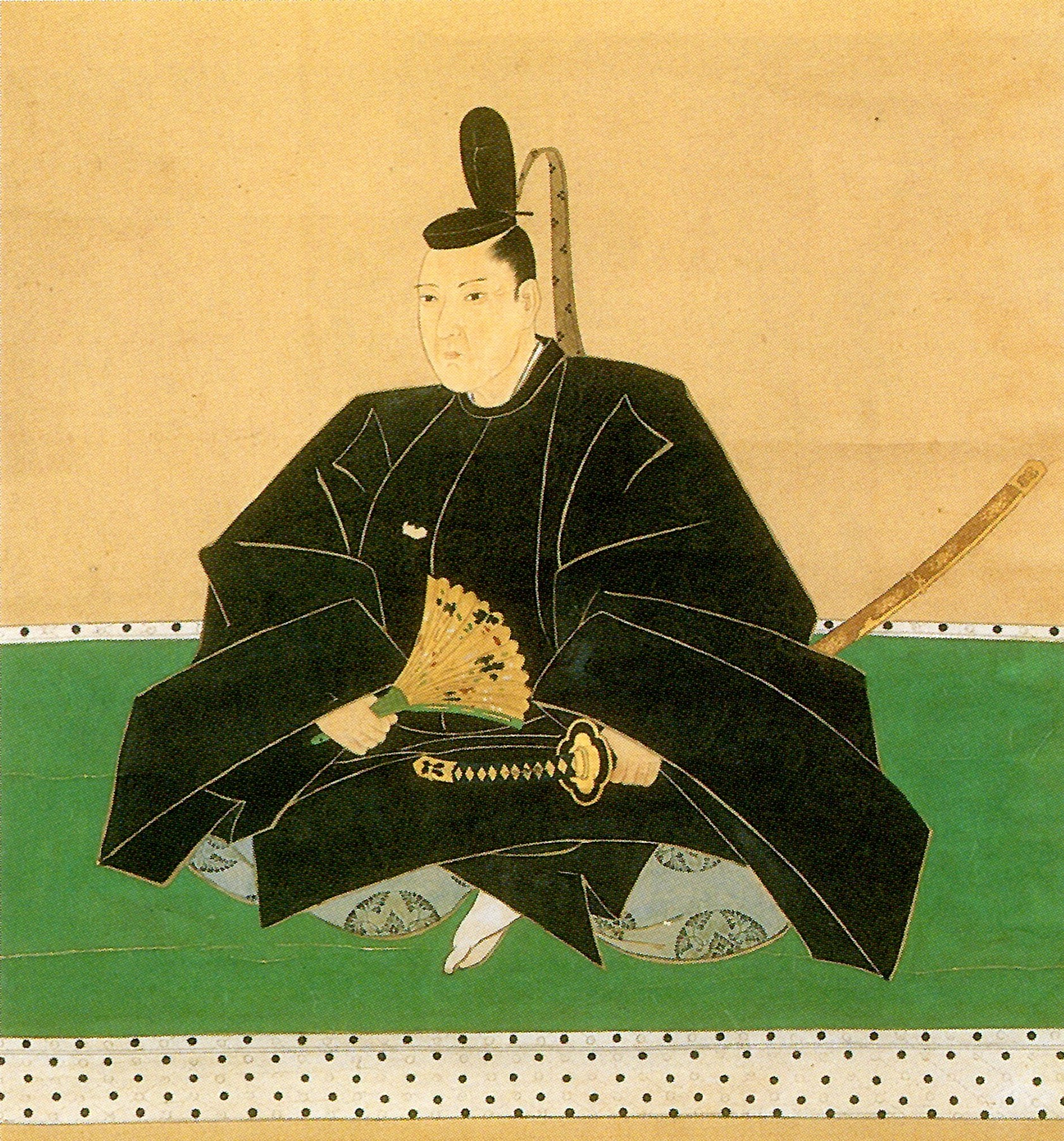
- Tsugaru Nobuaki
- Born: April 16, 1719
- Died: July 5, 1744 (aged 25); Hirosaki, Japan
- Occupation: Daimyō of Hirosaki Domain (1731–1744)
- Predecessor: Tsugaru Nobuhisa
- Successor: Tsugaru Nobuyasu
- Spouse(s): daughter of Arima Nobufusa, daimyō of Kurume Domain
- Parents: Tsugaru Nobuoki (father); daughter of Konoe Iehiro (mother)

Tsugaru Nobuaki (津軽 信著; April 16, 1719 – March 10, 1746) was the 6th daimyō of Hirosaki Domain in northern Mutsu Province, Honshū, Japan (modern-day Aomori Prefecture). His courtesy title was Dewa-no-kami, and his Court rank was Junior Fifth Rank, Lower Grade.

== Biography ==
Tsugaru Nobuaki was born as the eldest son of Tsugaru Nobuoki, the eldest son and heir of Tsugaru Nobuhisa, 5th daimyō of Hirosaki Domain. His father died in 1730, and when Nobuhisa retired in 1731, he appointed his grandson Nobuaki as his successor. He was presented in formal audience to shōgun Tokugawa Yoshimune the same year. Nobuaki was still in his minority, so all power remained in the hands of Nobuhisa.

During the early part of his tenure, Tsugaru Domain was initially prosperous; however, the profligate spending of Nobuhisa combined with one natural disaster after another soon brought the domain into financial crisis. The domain suffered from flooding followed by drought, earthquakes, volcanic eruptions (by Mount Iwaki and other volcanoes in Hokkaidō), tsunami, inclement weather, and repeated crop failures, which led to widespread famine and disease. The Tokugawa shogunate itself was in financial crisis, resulting in the implementation of the Kyōhō Reforms by shōgun Tokugawa Yoshimune, and not in a position to extend aid. Nobuaki continuing developing new paddy fields and irrigation works, and encouraged research of rangaku to help resolve the domain's problems and ever-increasing debt. However, almost as a final straw, the castle town of Hirosaki burned down in a great fire on May 11, 1746, and Nobuaki died two weeks later of sickness, at age 26.

Nobuhisa continued to exert influence behind-the-scenes all through Nobuaki's tenure from the clan's residence in Edo, and when Nobuaki died in 1744, Nobuhisa arranged to have Nobuaki's elder son, Nobuyasu (age 6), appointed daimyō. Nobuhisa continued as regent over Nabuyasu until his death on March 10, 1746.

Nobuaki's grave is at the temple of Shinryō-in (a subsidiary of Kan'ei-ji) in Taitō-ku, Tokyo, as well as the Tsugaru clan temple of Chōshō-ji in Hirosaki.

== See also ==
- Tsugaru clan

Preceded by Tsugaru Nobuhisa	6th Daimyō of Hirosaki; 1731–1744	Succeeded by Tsugaru Nobuyasu
