= Tsugaru Chikatari =

Japanese daimyō (1788–1849)

Tsugaru Chikatari 津軽親足
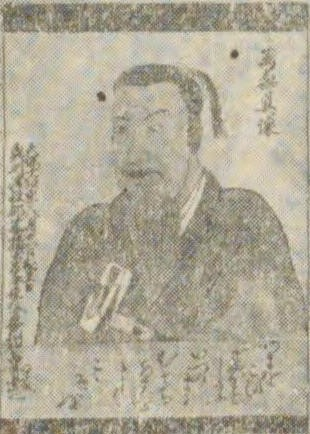
- Tsugaru Chikatari
- Born: 28 September 1788; Edo, Japan
- Died: 16 September 1849 (aged 60); Edo, Japan
- Occupation: Daimyō of Kuroishi Domain (1809–1825)
- Predecessor: none
- Successor: Tsugaru Yukitsugu
- Spouse(s): daughter of Matsudaira Tsuketsugu, daimyō of Miyazu Domain
- Father: Kuroda Naoyuki

Tsugaru Chikatari (津軽 親足; 28 September 1788 – 16 September 1849) was the 1st daimyō of Kuroishi Domain in northern Mutsu Province, Honshū, Japan (modern-day Aomori Prefecture). His courtesy title was Kai-no-kami, and his Court rank was Junior Fifth Rank, Lower Grade.

== Biography ==
Tsugaru Chikatari was the fourth son of Kuroda Naoyuki, daimyō of Kururi Domain in Kazusa Province, (part of present-day Chiba Prefecture) and was born in that domain's Edo residence. In 1805, he was adopted as the posthumous heir of Tsugaru Tsunetoshi (1789–1805), the 7th Lord of Kuroishi, a 4000 koku hatamoto dependency of Hirosaki Domain. However, in April 1809, the Tokugawa shogunate raised the status of Kuroishi to a full han as part of its agreement with Tsugaru Yasuchika over dispatch of troops to guard the Ezo frontier, and Chikatari saw his revenues increase by an additional 6000 koku, and allowing him to join the ranks of the daimyō.

In 1825, he retired, turning administration of the domain to his adopted son, Tsugaru Yukitsugu. He died in 1849 at the clan's residence in Edo. His grave is at the clan temple of Shinryō-in (a subsidiary of Kan'ei-ji) in Taitō-ku, Tokyo.

== See also ==
- Tsugaru clan

Preceded by none	1st Daimyō of Kuroishi; 1809-1825	Succeeded by Tsugaru Yukitsugu
