= Kuroishi =

Kuroishi (黒石) may refer to:

- Kuroishi, Aomori, a city in Aomori Prefecture
- Kuroishi Domain, a feudal domain that existed between 1809 and 1871
- The Kuroishi Jin'ya, the jin'ya (administrative headquarters) of the Kuroishi domain
- Kuroishi, Ōtoyo, a sub-municipal area in Ōtoyo, Kōchi
- Kuroishi, Shimanto, a sub-municipal area in Shimanto, Kōchi
