= Tsugumichi =

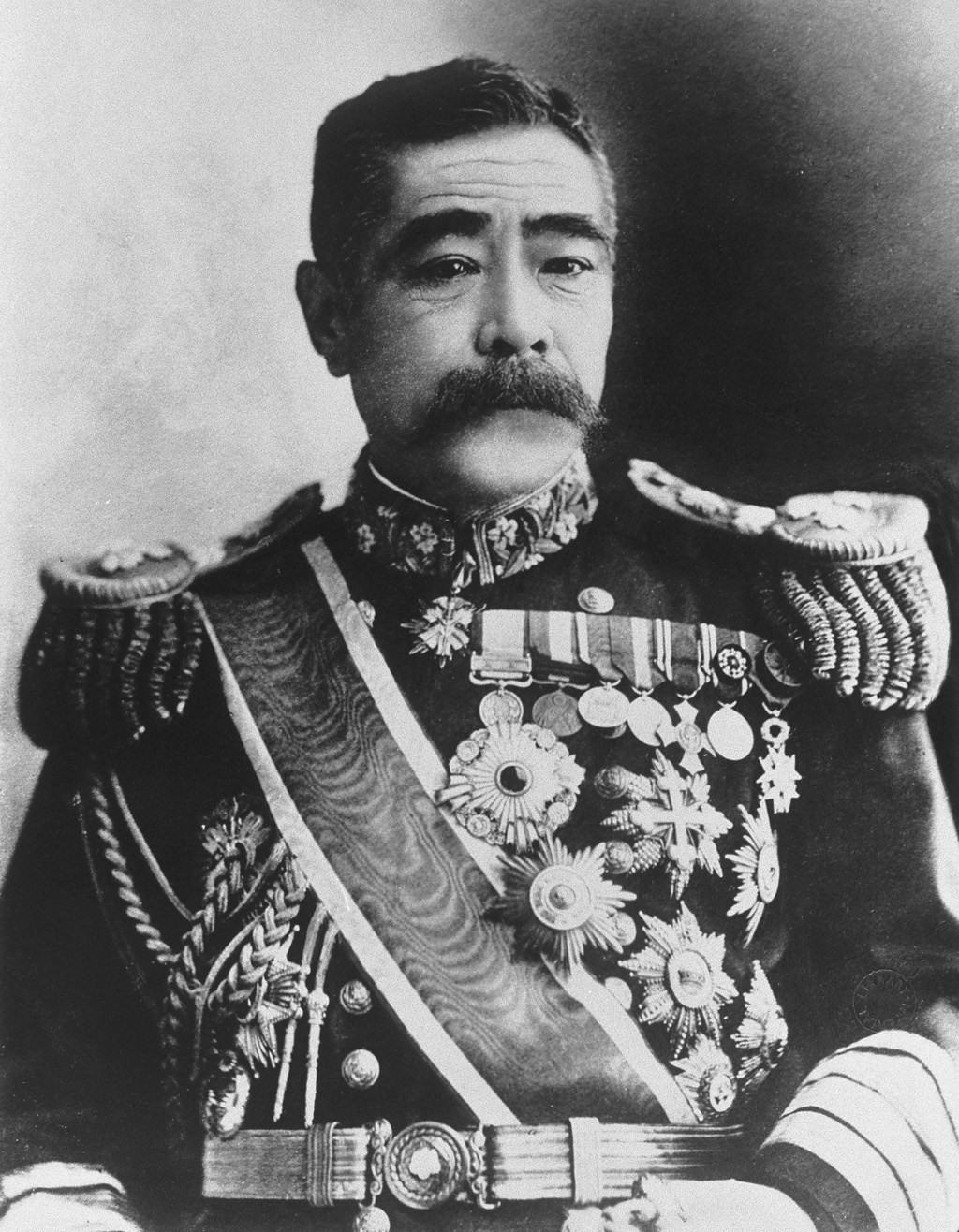
- Tsugumichi Saigo (1843–1902), Japanese politician and admiral in the Meiji period
- Pronunciation: tsɯgɯmitɕi (IPA)
- Gender: Male

Origin
- Origin: Japanese
- Meaning: Different meanings depending on the kanji used

Other names
- Alternative spelling: Tugumiti (Kunrei-shiki) Tugumiti (Nihon-shiki) Tsugumichi (Hepburn)

Tsugumichi is a masculine Japanese given name.

== Written forms ==
Tsugumichi can be written using different combinations of kanji characters. Here are some examples:

- 次道, "next, way"
- 次路, "next, route"
- 次通, "next, pass through"
- 嗣道, "succession, way"
- 嗣路, "succession, route"
- 嗣通, "succession, pass through"
- 継道, "continue, way"
- 継路, "continue, route"
- 継通, "continue, pass through"
- 従道, "comply, way"
- 承叙, "receive, relate"

The name can also be written in hiragana つぐみち or katakana ツグミチ.

== Notable people with the name ==
- Tsugumichi Suzuki (鈴木 従道, born 1945), Japanese long-distance runner.
- Tsugumichi Tsugaru (津軽 承叙, 1840–1903), Japanese daimyō.
- Tsugumichi Saigo (西郷 従道, 1843–1902), Japanese politician and admiral in the Meiji period.
