= Tsugaru Tsugumichi =

Japanese politician

Viscount Tsugaru Tsugumichi
- 津軽 承叙
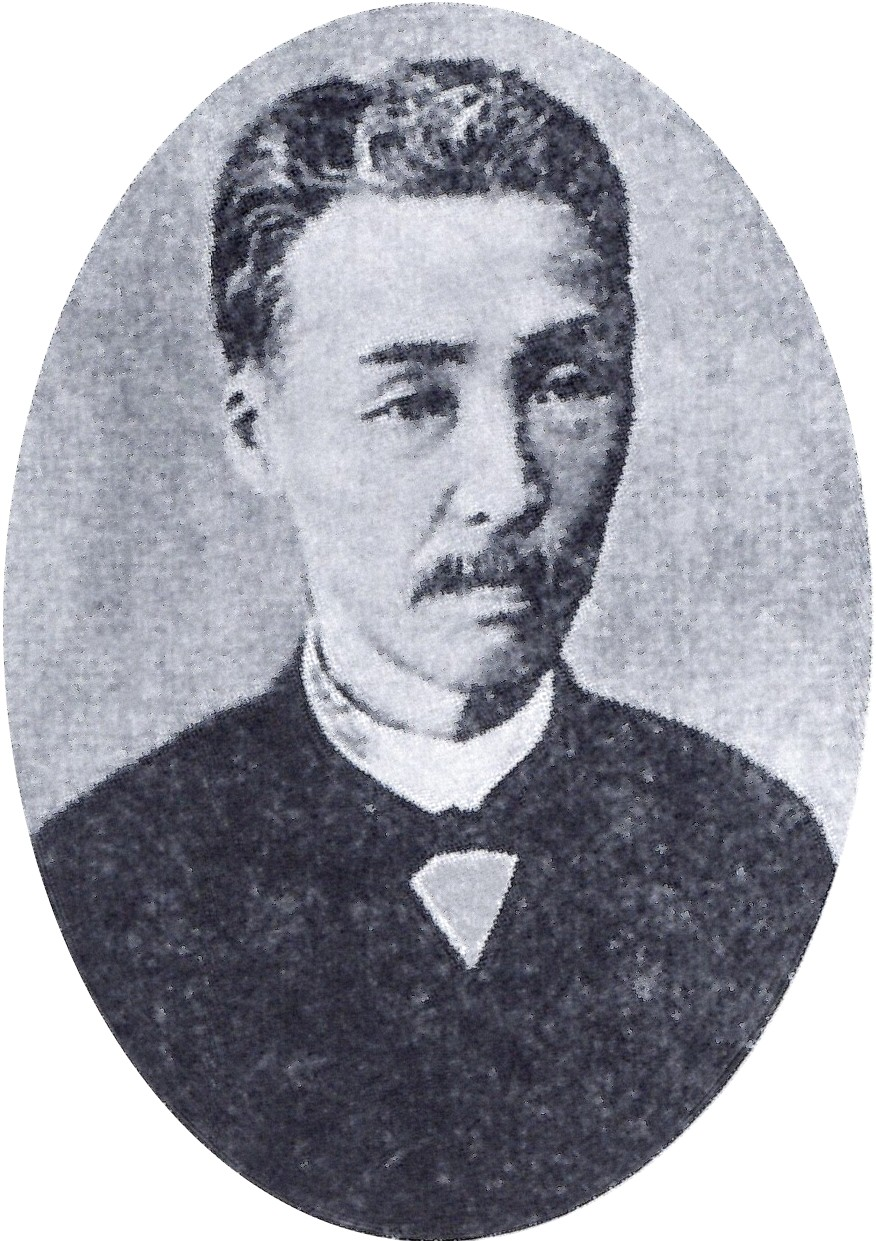
- Tsugaru Tsugumichi after the Meiji restoration

Member of the House of Peers
- In office February 1890 – 10 July 1897 Elected by the Viscounts

Governor of Kuroishi Domain
- In office 18 September 1869 – August 1871
- Monarch: Meiji
- Preceded by: Himself (as Daimyō of Kuroishi)
- Succeeded by: Position abolished

Daimyō of Kuroishi Domain
- In office 1851–1868
- Shōgun: Tokugawa Ieyoshi; Tokugawa Iesada; Tokugawa Iemochi; Tokugawa Yoshinobu
- Preceded by: Tsugaru Tsuguyasu
- Succeeded by: Himself (as Governor of Kuroishi)

Personal details
- Born: 24 September 1840
- Died: 7 December 1903 (aged 63)
- Resting place: Yanaka Cemetery
- Spouse: 4th daughter of Ikeda Narinori
- Parent: Tsugaru Yukitomo (father)

Tsugaru Tsugumichi (津軽 承叙; 24 September 1840 – 7 December 1903) was the fourth and final daimyō of Kuroishi Domain in northern Mutsu Province, Honshū, Japan (modern-day Aomori Prefecture). His courtesy title was Shikibu-no-shō, and his Court rank under the Tokugawa shogunate was Junior Fifth Rank, Lower Grade.

== Biography ==
Tsugaru Tsugumichi was the son of Tsugaru Yukitomo, from a branch line of the Tsugaru clan, and was adopted by the 3rd daimyō of Kuroishi, Tsugaru Tsuguyasu, as official heir due to the lack of a male descendant on Tsuguyasu's death in 1851. He changed his name at the time from Tsugaru Tomozumi to Tsugaru Tsugumichi.

Tsugumichi became daimyō during the turbulent Bakumatsu period, during which time the Tsugaru clan first sided with the pro-imperial forces of Satchō Alliance, and attacked nearby Shōnai Domain. However, the Tsugaru soon switched course, and briefly joined the Ōuetsu Reppan Dōmei. However, for reasons yet unclear, the Tsugaru backed out of the alliance and re-joined the imperial cause after a few months, participating in several battles in the Imperial cause during the Boshin War, notably that of the Battle of Noheji, and Battle of Hakodate.

After the Meiji Restoration, with the abolition of the han system, Tsugumichi was appointed Imperial Governor of Kuroishi from 1869 to 1871, at which time the territory was absorbed into the new Aomori Prefecture. He relocated to Tokyo, and with the establishment of the kazoku peerage system in 1882, he was awarded with the title of shishaku (viscount). He became a member of the House of Peers in 1890. In his later years, he was noted for his waka poems. On his death, he was posthumously granted Third court rank. His grave is at the Yanaka Cemetery in Taitō-ku, Tokyo.

== See also ==
- Tsugaru clan
