= Tsugaru Nobuakira =

Tsugaru Nobuakira 津軽信明
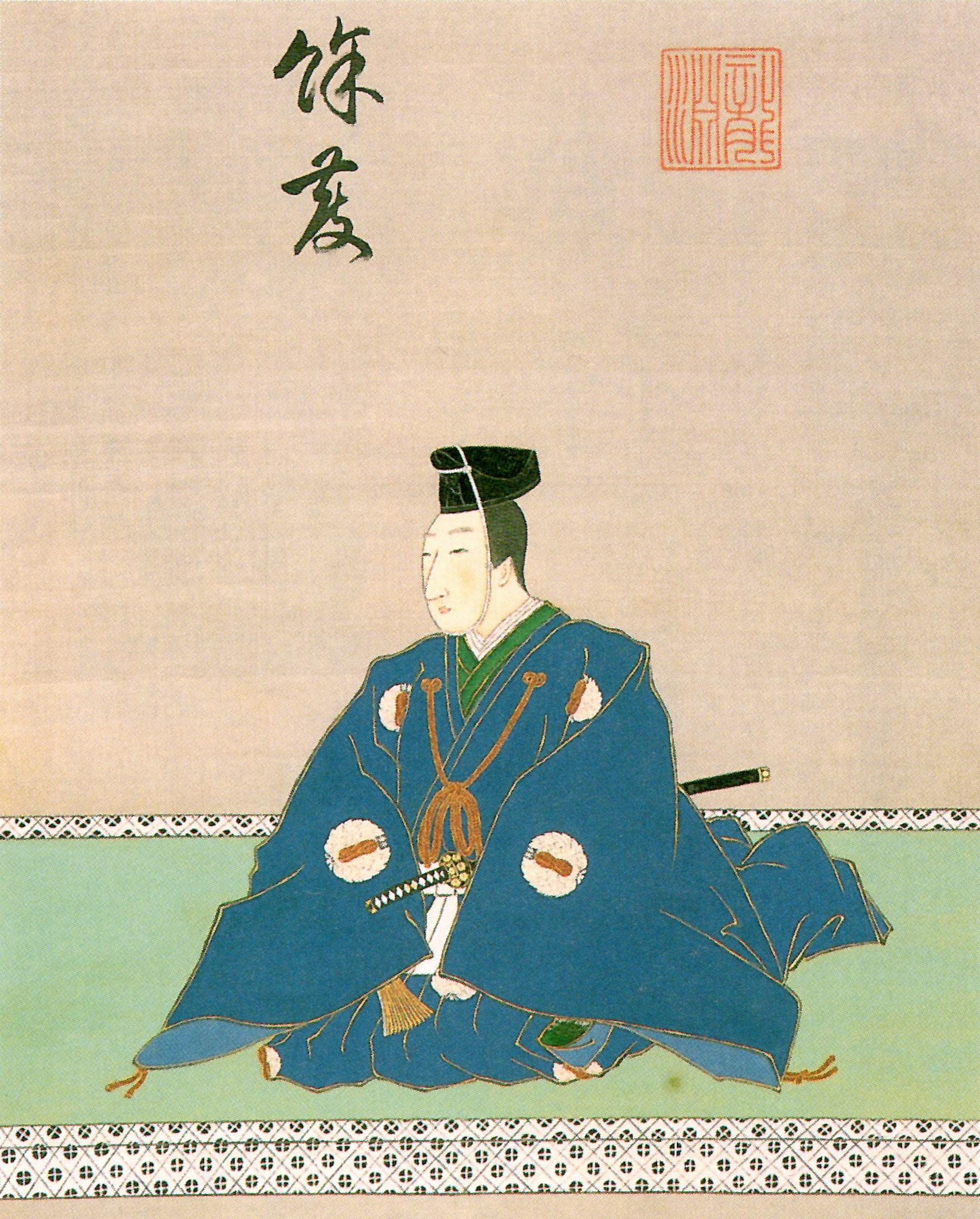
- Tsugaru Nobuakira
- Born: August 11, 1762
- Died: July 22, 1791 (aged 28)
- Occupation: Daimyō of Hirosaki Domain (1784–1791)
- Predecessor: Tsugaru Nobuyasu
- Successor: Tsugaru Yasuchika
- Spouse: daughter of Matsudaira Tomonori of Maebashi Domain
- Father: Tsugaru Nobuyasu

Tsugaru Nobuakira (津軽 信明; August 11, 1762 – July 22, 1791) was the 8th daimyō of Hirosaki Domain in northern Mutsu Province, Honshū, Japan (modern-day Aomori Prefecture). His courtesy title was Tosa-no-kami, and his Court rank was Junior Fifth Rank, Lower Grade.

== Biography ==
Tsugaru Nobuyasu was the eldest son of Tsugaru Nobuyasu, 7th daimyō of Hirosaki Domain. In 1776, he was received in formal audience by shōgun Tokugawa Ieharu and succeeded his father in 1784. Noted for his intelligence and learning at an early age, he corresponded with a number of other daimyō noted for their good government, including Hosokawa Shigekata of Kumamoto Domain, Uesugi Harunori of Yonezawa Domain and Matsudaira Sadanobu of Shirakawa Domain. Nobuakira inherited a domain stricken by extensive famine caused by repeated natural disasters and mismanagement. Domain records indicate that 130,000 peasants perished during the Great Tenmei Famine alone, while corrupt senior officials during his father's reign had been selling of all of the domain's rice reserves for their personal profit to merchants in Edo. Nobuyasu soon took steps to restore the domain's finances, promote new industries and the development of new crops, and to reign in the worst excesses of his senior retainers. One of his reforms was to implement a new land survey, the first in over 200 years in the domain, to reassess taxable income and to permit farmers to exchange exhausted lands for new farmland. However, these reforms sparked considerable opposition within the domain's vested interests, and Nobuakira’s sudden and unexpected death at the age of 28 may have been by poisoning. As Nobuakira died without an heir, the next daimyō of Hirosaki Domain, Tsugaru Yasuchika was the son of Tsugaru Akitaka, from the clan's subsidiary holding in Kuroishi.

His grave is at the clan temple of Shinryō-in (a subsidiary of Kan'ei-ji) in Taitō-ku, Tokyo.

== See also ==
- Tsugaru clan

Preceded by Tsugaru Nobuyasu	8th Daimyō of Hirosaki; 1784–1791	Succeeded by Tsugaru Yasuchika
