= Tsugaru Tsuguakira =

Count Tsugaru Tsuguakira
- 津軽承昭
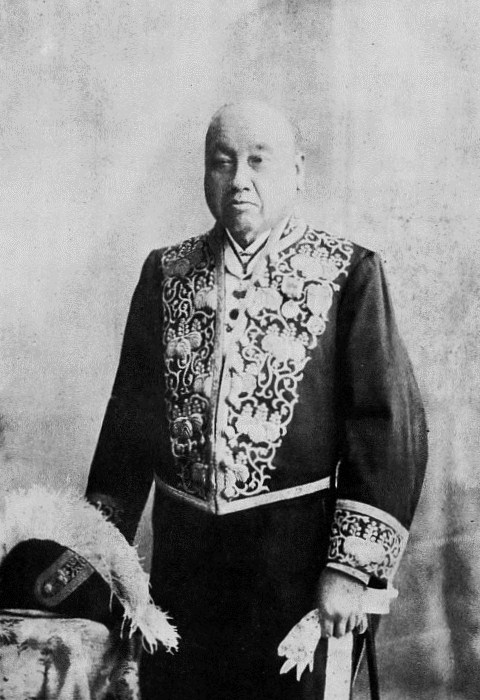
- Tsugaru Tsuguakira (in 1913)

12th Daimyō of Hirosaki Domain
- In office 1859–1868
- Monarchs: Shōgun: Tokugawa Iemochi; Tokugawa Yoshinobu
- Preceded by: Tsugaru Yukitsugu
- Succeeded by: Position abolished

Imperial Governor of Hirosaki
- In office 1869–1871
- Monarch: Emperor Meiji

Personal details
- Born: September 7, 1840; Edo, Japan
- Died: July 19, 1916 (aged 75); Tokyo, Japan
- Spouse: daughter of Tsugaru Yukitsugu
- Domestic partner: daughter of Konoe Tadahiro
- Parent: Hosokawa Narimori (father)

Count Tsugaru Tsuguakira (津軽 承昭, September 7, 1840 – July 19, 1916) was the 12th and final daimyō of Hirosaki Domain in northern Mutsu Province, Honshū, Japan (modern-day Aomori Prefecture). His courtesy title was Tosa-no-kami, which was later upgraded to Etchū-no-kami and Jiju, and his Court rank under the Tokugawa shogunate was Junior Fourth Rank, Lower Grade.

== Biography ==
Tsugaru Tsuguakira was the 4th son of Hosokawa Narimori, the 8th daimyō of Uto Domain, a sub-domain of Kumamoto Domain in Kyushu. He married the 4th daughter of Tsugaru Yukitsugu, 11th daimyō of Hirosaki Domain, and was adopted as his heir in 1857.

Tsuguakira became daimyō on February 7, 1859 on the retirement of Yukitsugu, and continued his predecessor's policies of modernizing and westernizing the domain's military forces. He became daimyō during the turbulent Bakumatsu period, during which time the Tsugaru clan first sided with the pro-imperial forces of Satchō Alliance and attacked nearby Shōnai Domain. The domain then briefly defected to the pro-Tokugawa Ōuetsu Reppan Dōmei, but, for reasons yet unclear, soon backed out of the alliance and re-joined the imperial cause after a few months, participating in several battles during the Boshin War, notably that of the Battle of Noheji, and Battle of Hakodate on the pro-Meiji side.

After the Meiji Restoration, with the abolition of the han system, he was appointed Imperial Governor of Hirosaki from 1869 to 1871, at which time the territory was absorbed into the new Aomori Prefecture.

He relocated to Tokyo. With the establishment of the kazoku peerage system in 1882, Tsuguakira was awarded with the title of hakushaku (count). After his retirement from public life, he served as a director of the Number 15 National Bank (第十五国立銀行, Dai jūgo kokuritsu ginkō), and was noted for his waka poetry. He died in Tokyo in 1916, and his grave is at the Yanaka Cemetery in Taitō-ku, Tokyo.

Tsugaru Tsuguakira had no son, and adopted the younger son of the court noble Konoe Tadafusa, who took the name of Tsugaru Hidemaru (津軽英麿) (1872–1919) to be his heir.

== See also ==
- Tsugaru clan

== Notes ==
- The content of much of this article was derived from that of the corresponding article on Japanese Wikipedia.
