= Tsugaru Nobuhisa =

5th daimyō of Hirosaki, Honshū, Japan

Tsugaru Nobuhisa 津軽 信寿
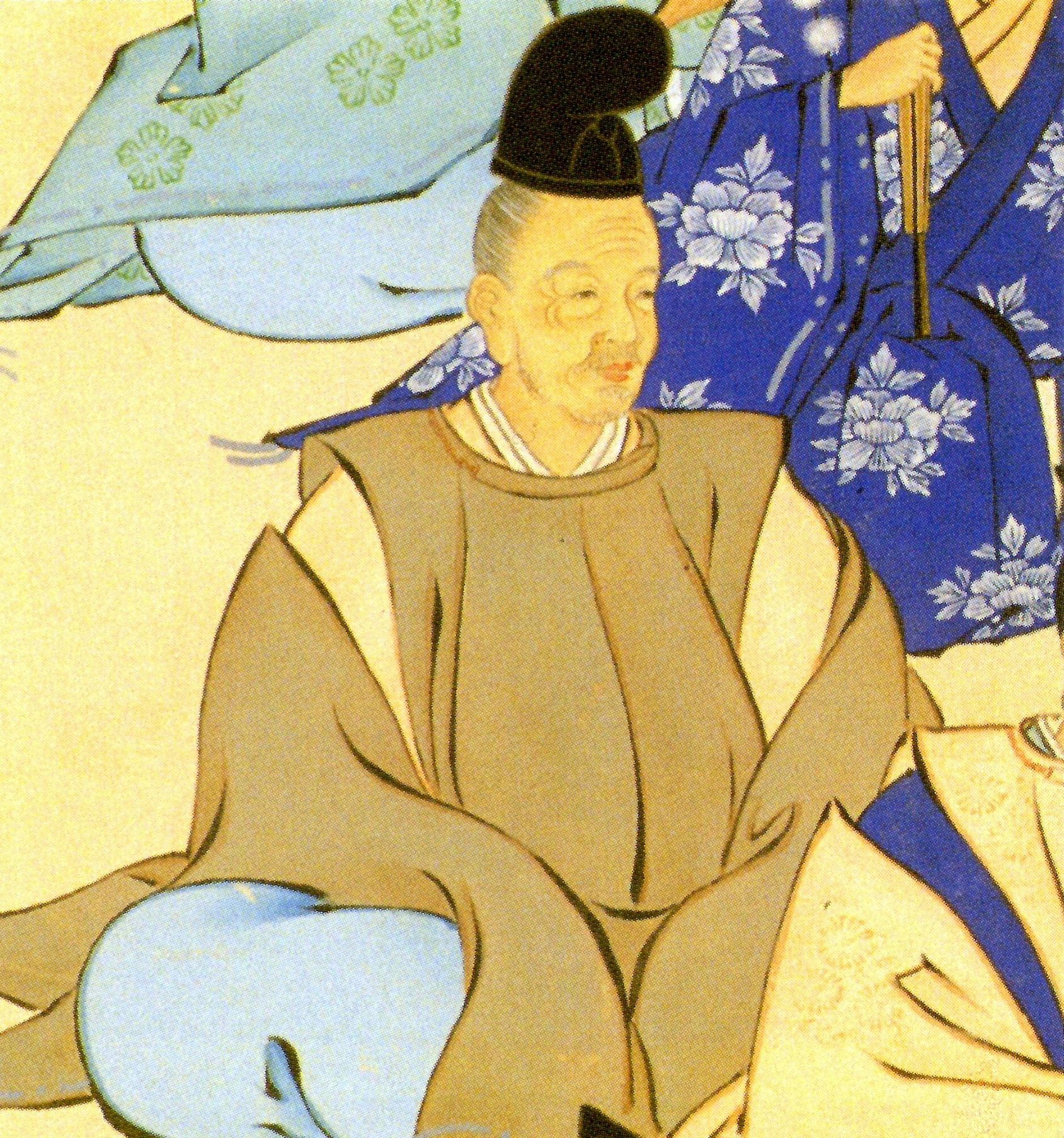
- Tsugaru Nobuhisa
- Born: June 22, 1669
- Died: March 10, 1746 (aged 76); Edo, Japan
- Occupation: Daimyō of Hirosaki Domain (1656–1710)
- Predecessor: Tsugaru Nobumasa
- Successor: Tsugaru Nobuaki
- Spouse(s): daughter of Matsudaira Tadanao, daimyō of Shirakawa Domain
- Father: Tsugaru Nobumasa

Tsugaru Nobuhisa (津軽 信寿; June 22, 1669 – March 10, 1746) was the 5th daimyō of Hirosaki Domain in northern Mutsu Province, Honshū, Japan (modern-day Aomori Prefecture). His courtesy title was Tosa-no-kami, and his Court rank was Junior Fifth Rank, Lower Grade.

== Biography ==
Tsugaru Nobuhisa was the second son of Tsugaru Nobumasa, 4th daimyō of Hirosaki Domain. His childhood name was Takechiyo, and his original adult name was Tsugaru Nobushige. He resided in Edo during the first half of his life, and visited Hirosaki the first time only on his father's death. On his accession to the lordship at the age of 43, he proclaimed seven days of mourning, followed by elaborate ceremonies enshrining his father at the Shinto shrine of Takateru Jinja in Hirosaki. Nobuhisa was a noted swordsman, having studied under the Ono-ha Ittō-ryu school while residing in Edo. He also studied Japanese calligraphy and Japanese painting under masters of the Kanō school, and sponsored the lacquer artist Ogawa Haritsu to develop the craft as an industry for Tsugaru Domain. After becoming daimyō of Hirosaki, in addition to continuing development of new paddy fields and irrigation works as started by his father and grandfather, he also commissioned art works and a history of the Tsugaru clan. He also successfully prosecuted a boundary dispute with the Tsugaru clan’s arch-rivals, the Nanbu clan of Morioka Domain, with the Tokugawa shogunate ruling completely in the Tsugaru clan's favor. This issue would resurface again in 107 years with the attempt in 1821 by Nanbu samurai to assassinate the Tsugaru daimyō in the "Sōma Daisaku Incident.

Against this background, Hirosaki Domain had serious financial issues. Inclement weather and repeated eruptions of Mount Iwaki resulted in repeated crop failures. The Domain cut the stipends for its retainers and raised taxes repeatedly to unsustainable levels, imposed stringent sumptuary laws, and finally was forced to send many of its lower level retainers away. On the other hand, Nobuhisa surrounded himself with sycophants at his Edo residence and continued to live a life of profligate luxury. Word of this reached the ears of shōgun Tokugawa Yoshimune, and influenced the sections of the Kyōhō Reforms emphasizing the need for frugality.

On May 16, 1731, Nobuhisa retired in favor of his grandson Nobuaki, then aged 13, and continued to rule behind-the-scenes. However, Nobuaki died in 1744, and Nobuhisa arranged to have his great-grandson Nobuyasu (age 6) appointed daimyō. Nobuhisa continued to rule behind-the-scenes until his death on March 10, 1746. Nobuhisa had 5 sons and 6 daughters. His grave is at the clan temple of Shinryō-in (a subsidiary of Kan'ei-ji) in Taitō-ku, Tokyo.

== See also ==
- Tsugaru clan

Preceded by Tsugaru Nobumasa	5th Daimyō of Hirosaki; 1710–1731	Succeeded by Tsugaru Nobuaki
