= Wajiro Kon =

Japanese architect, designer and educator

Wajiro Kon in Paris, 1930

Wajiro Kon (今和次郎, Kon Wajirō; 10 July 1888 – 27 October 1973) was a Japanese architect, designer, and educator. He is known as the father of "modernology" (kogengaku), a branch of sociology which studied the changes in cityscape and people which emerged as a consequence of Tokyo becoming a modern metropolis in the early Showa Era. His maternal grandfather was the kokugakusha Osari Nakaakira.

Born in Hirosaki, Kon studied graphic design at Tokyo University of the Arts, where he collaborated with artists and ethnographers. He then became a professor at Waseda University in the Department of Architecture. In the 1920s he studied rural Japan with the ethnographer Kunio Yanagita. After the 1923 Great Kantō earthquake he turned his attention to urban life, recording post-disaster conditions in Tokyo. In 1927, borrowing from the Esperanto term modernologio, he wrote the manifesto "What is Modernology?", where he presented his scientific method for analyzing the material culture of urban citizens throughout Japan and its colonies, with a particular focus on the lifestyles and habits of "cultured peoples" (bunkajin).
