= Kuroishi Domain =

Feudal domain of the Tokugawa shogunate

Kuroishi Domain 黒石藩
- Domain of Japan
- 1809–1871
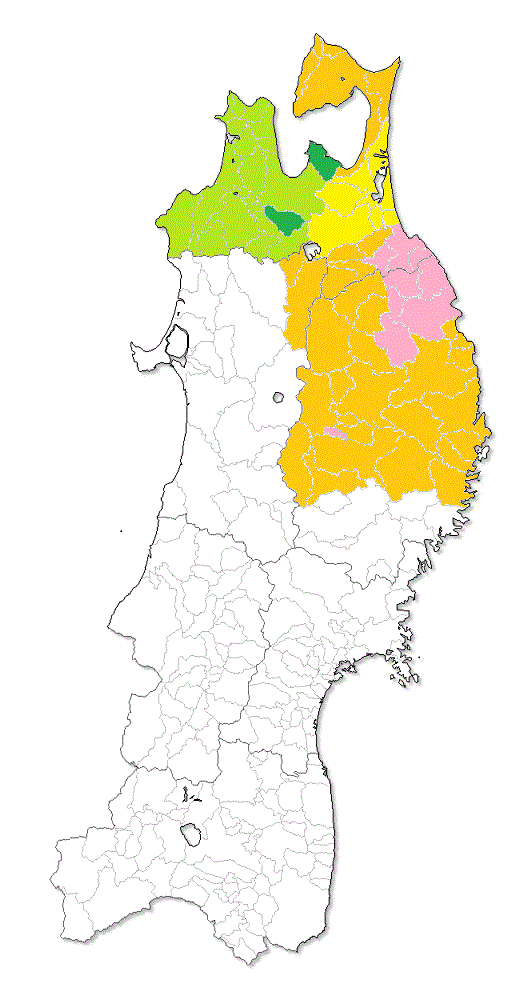
- Map of Nanbu and Tsugaru clan holdings in the late Edo period. Hirosaki Domain in green, Kuroishi Domain in dark green; lands of the rival Nanbu Domain are in yellow and orange
- Capital: Kuroishi jin'ya
- Area
  - Coordinates: 40°36′25″N 140°27′52″E
  - Type: Daimyō
- Historical era: Edo period
  - Split from Hirosaki Domain: 1809
  - Disestablished: 1871
| Preceded by | Succeeded by |
| Sendai Domain | Kuroishi Prefecture |
- Today part of: Aomori Prefecture

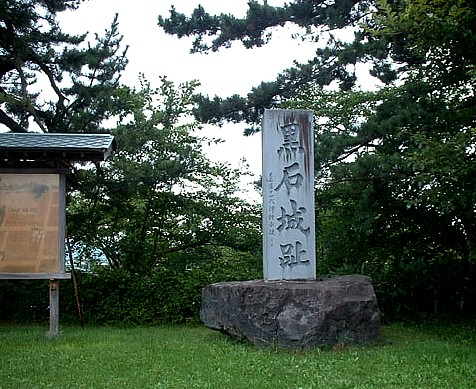
Site of Kuroishi Jin'ya, Kuroishi, Aomori

Kuroishi Domain (黒石藩, Kuroishi-han) was a tozama feudal domain under the Tokugawa shogunate of Edo period Japan. It is located in northwestern Mutsu Province, Honshū. Its territory included 2000 koku in the area around present-day city of Kuroishi, 1000 koku in present-day Hiranani, and 2000 koku in what is now part of Ōta, Gunma. The domain was centered at Kuroishi Jin'ya, located in the center of what is now the city of Kuroishi in Aomori Prefecture.

== History ==
Kuroishi Domain began as a 5,000 koku hatamoto holding, created in 1656 for Tsugaru Nobufusa (1620–1662), the younger son of Tsugaru Nobuhira, 2nd daimyō of Hirosaki Domain. Nobuhira had an elder son (Tsugaru Nobuyoshi) by his first wife, the daughter of Ishida Mitsunari, who had been reduced to concubine status when Nobuhira married the niece of Tokugawa Ieyasu to secure his position vis-à-vis the new Tokugawa bakufu following the death of Toyotomi Hideyoshi. However, his position as the son of a concubine resulted in a split in the ranks of the senior retainers of Tsugaru Domain, with a large faction supporting the younger Tsugaru Nobufusa due to his blood connection to the Tokugawa clan, and due to the fact that he was born as son of Nobuhira's official wife. This resulted in an O-Ie Sōdō known as the Funahashi Sōdō of 1634, which was only suppressed with assistance by the Tokugawa shogunate and resulted in the exile of a number of Nobufusa's supporters in 1636. Problems arose again in 1647 in what was called the Tempyō Sōdō, with remaining supporters of Nobufusa demanding that Nobuyoshi retire in favor of Nobufusa, alleging misgovernment through excessive drinking and womanizing. The situation was partly resolved by the creation of a semi-autonomous subsidiary holding for Nobufusa based at Kuroishi. The size of the holding was later reduced to 4000 koku after Nobufusa's death.

However, in 1809, the Tokugawa shogunate raised the revenues of Kuroishi by 6000 koku during the rule of Tsugaru Chikatari as part of an agreement with Hirosaki daimyō Tsugaru Yasuchika over making Hirosaki Domain partially responsible for guarding the northern frontier lands of Ezo (including Karafuto and the Chishima Islands). The total revenues of 10,000 koku enabled Tsugaru Chikatari and his successors to enter the ranks of the daimyō.

The 2nd daimyō of Kuroishi Domain, Tsugaru Yukitsugu became daimyō of Hirosaki Domain after the forced retirement of Tsugaru Nobuyuki, turning the Kuroishi Domain over to his younger brother Tsugaru Tsuguyasu.

During the Boshin War of the Meiji Restoration, the 4th daimyō of Kuroishi Tsugaru Tsugumichi initially supported the Ōuetsu Reppan Dōmei, but then defected to the Imperial cause and joined with the forces of Hirosaki Domain at the Battle of Noheji against the forces of Hachinohe Domain and Morioka Domain. Afterwards, his forces also fought in campaigns in Hokkaidō. In July 1871, with the abolition of the han system, Kuroishi Domain briefly became Kuroishi Prefecture, and was merged into the newly created Aomori Prefecture in September 1871. Under the new Meiji government, Tsugaru Tsugumichi was given the kazoku peerage title of shishaku (viscount), and later served as a member of the House of Peers.

== List of hatamoto rulers of Kuroishi ==
1. Tsugaru Nobufusa (津軽信英) (1656-1662)
2. Tsugaru Nobutoshi (津軽信敏) (1662-1683)
3. Tsugaru Masatake (津軽政兕) (1683-1743)
4. Tsugaru Hisayo (津軽寿世) (1743-1758)
5. Tsugaru Akitaka (津軽著高) (1758-1778)
6. Tsugaru Yasuchika (津軽寧親) (1778-1791)
7. Tsugaru Tsunetoshi (津軽典暁) (1791-1805)
8. Tsugaru Chikatari (津軽親足) (1805-1809)

== List of daimyō ==
- Tsugaru clan (Tozama) 1809-1871

| | Name | Tenure | Courtesy title | Court Rank | kokudaka |
|---|---|---|---|---|---|
| 1 | Tsugaru Chikatari (津軽親足) | 1809–1825 | Kai-no-kami (甲斐守) | Lower 5th (従五位下) | 10,000 koku |
| 2 | Tsugaru Yukinori (津軽順徳) | 1825–1839 | Sakon-no-shōgen (左近将監) | Lower 5th (従五位下) | 10,000 koku |
| 3 | Tsugaru Tsuguyasu (津軽承保) | 1839–1851 | Izumo-no-kami (出雲守) | Lower 5th (従五位下) | 10,000 koku |
| 4 | Tsugaru Tsugumichi (津軽承叙) | 1851–1869 | Shikibu-no-shō (式部少輔) | 3rd (正三位), shishaku | 10,000 koku |

== Bakumatsu period holdings ==
Unlike with most domains in the han system, Kuroishi Domain consisted of a continuous territory calculated to provide the assigned kokudaka, based on periodic cadastral surveys and projected agricultural yields. At the end of the Tokugawa shogunate, the domain consisted of the following holdings:

- Mutsu Province
  - 50 villages in Tsugaru District
- Iwashiro Province
  - 1 village in Date District

== See also ==
- List of Han
