= Tsugaru Yasuchika =

Tsugaru Yasuchika 津軽寧親
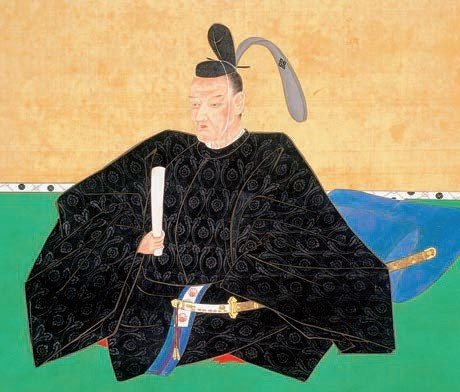
- Tsugaru Yasuchika
- Born: March 8, 1765; Kuroishi, Japan
- Died: July 30, 1833 (aged 68); Edo, Japan
- Occupation: Daimyō of Hirosaki Domain (1791–1825)
- Predecessor: Tsugaru Nobuakira
- Successor: Tsugaru Nobuyuki
- Parents: Tsugaru Akitaka (father); daughter of Kuroda Naozumi, daimyō of Kurume Domain (mother)

Tsugaru Yasuchika (津軽 寧親; March 8, 1765 – July 30, 1833) was the 9th daimyō of Hirosaki Domain in northern Mutsu Province, Honshū, Japan (modern-day Aomori Prefecture). His courtesy title, initially Dewa-no-kami, was later raised to Saikyo Daiyu and Jujū, and his Court rank was Junior Fourth Rank, Lower Grade.

== Biography ==
Tsugaru Yasuchika was the eldest son of Tsugaru Akitaka, the 5th lord of Kuroishi, a 4000-koku hatamoto holding created for the second son of Tsugaru Nobuhira, the 2nd daimyō of Hirosaki. Nobuhira was married to a daughter of Ishida Mitsunari; however, for political reasons after the establishment of the Tokugawa shogunate, he found it expedient to reduce her to concubine status and to marry an adopted daughter of Tokugawa Ieyasu instead. Nevertheless, the son of his first wife, Tsugaru Nobuyoshi remained his heir, which resulted in an O-Ie Sōdō by supporters of the son by his second wife, Tsugaru Nobufusa. The shogunate ruled in favour of Nobuyoshi, and the Kuroishi holding was created for Nobufusa and his descendants.

When Tsugaru Nobuakira, the 8th daimyō of Tsugaru Domain died without heir in 1791, Yasuchika was posthumously adopted into the main Tsugaru house as his successor, and the Kuroishi holding was turned over to his eldest son. He was received in formal audience by shōgun Tokugawa Ienari the same year.

Yasuchika implemented many of the reforms initiated by Nobuakira to restore prosperity to the disaster-prone domain, including having many of his samurai turn to part-time farming to maintain their revenues. In 1796, he established a Domain academy called the Keikokan. The domain was struck by a large earthquake and tsunami in 1793.

In 1805, the Shogunate charged Tsugaru Domain with the responsibility of maintaining the security of a portion of Ezo, an area considered loosely at the time to encompass present-day Hokkaidō, Karafuto and the southern Kurile Islands. In return, the kokudaka of the domain were increased to 70,000 koku. The kokudaka of the domain was further increased to 100,000 koku in 1808, and in 1809 Kuroishi was raised to a full han status. Yasuchika also received a promotion in court rank from Junior Fifth to Junior Fourth rank.

However, the increase in revenue was far less than the expense of dispatching troops and maintaining garrisons in the wide expanses of the northern islands, and increases in local taxation led to widespread peasant revolts by 1813. Yasuchika received a promotion in his courtesy title in 1820 to honorary chamberlain (Jujū). The promotion incensed the samurai of Tsugaru's rivals, the Nanbu clan of Morioka Domain, which cumulated in the Sōma Daisaku Incident of 1821, in which a Nanbu samurai attempted to assassinate Yasuchika.

In 1825, Yasuchika turned rule of the domain over to his second son and went into retirement, spending his time writing haiku poetry. He died at the domain's Edo residence in 1833. His grave is at the clan temple of Shinryō-in (a subsidiary of Kan'ei-ji) in Taitō-ku, Tokyo.

== See also ==
- Tsugaru clan

Preceded by Tsugaru Nobuakira	9th Daimyō of Hirosaki; 1791–1825	Succeeded by Tsugaru Nobuyuki
