= Tsugaru clan =

Japanese samurai clan

Tsugaru clan 津軽
- Tsugaru clan emblem
- Home province: Mutsu Province
- Parent house: Uncertain
- Titles: Various
- Founder: Tsugaru Tamenobu
- Final ruler: Tsugaru Tsuguakira
- Current head: Tsugaru Shin
- Founding year: 1590
- Ruled until: 1873 (Abolition of the han system)
- Cadet branches: See below

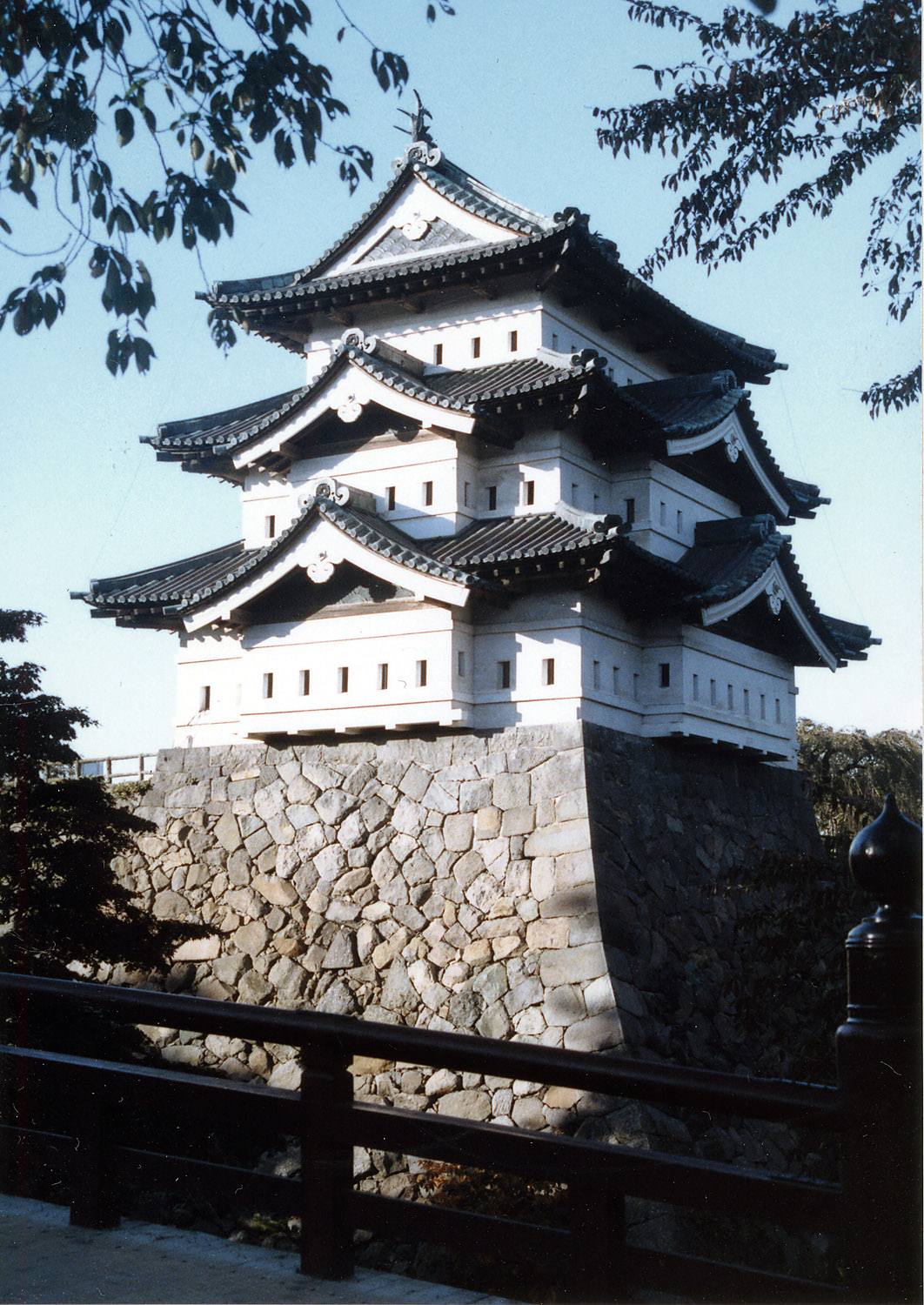
Hirosaki Castle

The Tsugaru clan (Japanese: 津軽氏, Hepburn: Tsugaru-shi) was a Japanese samurai clan who ruled the northwestern half of what is now Aomori Prefecture in the Tōhoku region of Japan under the Edo period Tokugawa shogunate. The Tsugaru were daimyō of Hirosaki Domain and its semi-subsidiary, Kuroishi Domain. The Tsugaru were in constant conflict with their former overlords, the Nanbu clan of adjoining Morioka Domain. During the Boshin War of 1868-69, the Tsugaru clan fought mostly on the pro-imperial side, although it did briefly join the Ōuetsu Reppan Dōmei. In the Meiji period, the official status of the daimyō was abolished. The former daimyō, including the Tsugaru, became part of the kazoku peerage instead, with Tsugaru Tsuguakira receiving the title of hakushaku (Count).

== Origins ==
Much about the ancestry of the Tsugaru clan is uncertain. Ōura Tamenobu was born in 1550, as the adopted son and heir of Ōura Tamenori, a retainer of the Nanbu clan, based at Sannohe Castle. He succeeded his father in 1567 or 1568 as castellan of Ōura Castle, located in what is now part of the city of Hirosaki. According to later Tsugaru clan records, the clan was descendant from the noble Fujiwara clan and had an ancient claim to ownership of the Tsugaru region of northwestern Honshu; however, according to the records of their rivals, the Nanbu clan, Tamenobu was born as either Nanbu Tamenobu or Kuji Tamenobu, from a minor branch house of the Nanbu clan and was driven from the clan due to discord with his elder brother.

The Ōura served as hereditary vice-district magistrate (郡代補佐, gundai hosa) under the Nanbu clan's local magistrate Ishikawa Takanobu; however, in 1571 Tamenobu attacked and killed Ishikawa and began taking the Nanbu clan's castles in the Tsugaru region one after another. He captured castles at Ishikawa, Daikoji and Aburakawa, and soon gathered support of many former Nanbu retainers in the region. Tamenobu later attacked Kitabatake Akimura (another local power figure) and took his castle at Namioka.

In 1582, with the death of Nanbu Harumasa, the Nanbu clan collapsed into numerous competing factions. The 25th hereditary clan chieftain, Nanbu Harutsugu, was a boy of 13 and soon died under uncertain circumstances, and the Kunohe branch of the Nanbu clan under the warlord Kunohe Masazane began to expand its influence over the Sannohe main branch. This provided an opportunity for Ōura Tamenobu to declare that the western Nanbu territories under his control would henceforth be independent of Nanbu rule. Proclaimed a traitor by the Nanbu clan, rivals Nanbu Nobunao and Kunohe Masazane both called for Tamenobu's death. Tamenobu, realizing that he would need to solicit outside help, approached the Mogami clan for an introduction to the regime of Toyotomi Hideyoshi. Tamenobu initially departed by boat from Ajigasawa, but inclement winds blew the boat north as far as Matsumae. He made attempts to reach Hideyoshi overland in 1586, 1587 and 1588, but was blocked each time by hostile forces in the territories to the south of Tsugaru.

In 1590, Tamenobu pledged fealty to Toyotomi Hideyoshi; Hideyoshi confirmed Tamenobu in his holdings. As the Ōura fief had been in the Tsugaru region on the northern tip of Honshū, the family then changed its name to Tsugaru.

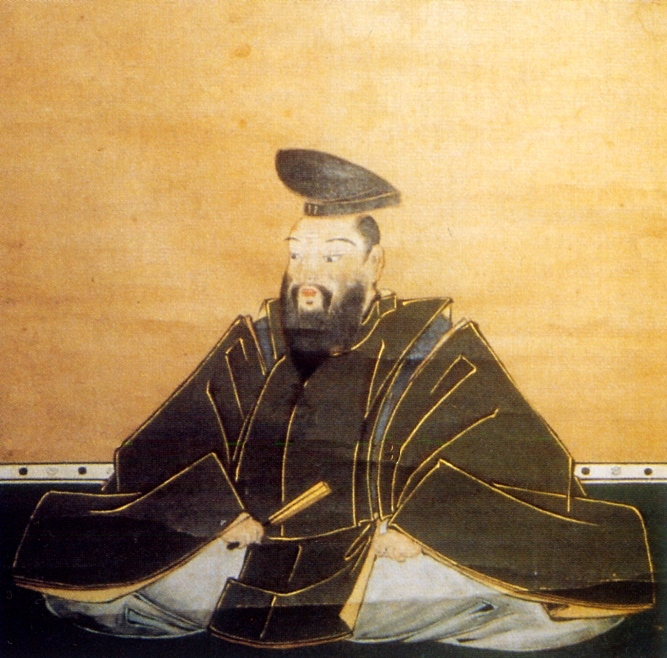
Tsugaru (Ōura) Tamenobu

== In the Edo era ==
The Tsugaru clan sided with Tokugawa Ieyasu during the Battle of Sekigahara in 1600, although Tsugaru Tamenobu's eldest son, Nobutake, was serving Toyotomi Hideyori as a page in Osaka Castle.

After the Tokugawa victory at Sekigahara, the Tsugaru clan remained somewhat “suspect” in the eyes of the fledgling Tokugawa shogunate as Tsugaru Tamenobu granted refuge to Ishida Mitsunari’s son and arranged for Ishida Mitsunari's daughter to marry his third son and heir, Tsugaru Nobuhira. As a result, the clan was confirmed in its original territory with only a nominal increase in kokudaka to 47,000 koku. Tsugaru Tamenobu further fueled concerns by reconstructing Hirosaki Castle on a massive scale disproportionate to the size of his territories.

The early years of the Edo era were marked by a series of major O-Ie Sōdō disturbances over the succession to the clan chieftainship. Tsugaru Nobuhira's accession was disputed by supporters of the son of Tsugaru Nobutake in the Tsugaru Disturbance (津軽騒動, Tsugaru-sōdō) of 1607. Further troubles arose in the Kōsaka Kurando's Riot (高坂蔵人の乱, Kōsaka Kurando no ran) of 1612, the Funabashi Disturbance (船橋騒動, Funabashi-sōdō) of 1634, and the Shōhō Disturbance (正保騒動, Shōhō-sōdō) of 1647.

Tsugaru Nobuhira was forced to reduce his wife to concubine status and marry a niece of Tokugawa Ieyasu to strength his political ties to the shogunate. However, he named the son by his first wife, Tsugaru Nobuyoshi as heir. His son by the niece of Tokugawa Ieyasu was made head of a subsidiary hatamoto household based in Kuroishi.

Nobuyoshi was forced to retire in 1655 for alleged misgovernment, and was replaced by his son, Tsugaru Nobumasa, who was a reformer who developed the resources of the domain. Nobumasa's son Tsugaru Nobuhisa developed the arts and cultural level of the domain, but was beset by numerous natural disasters, including bad weather and repeated eruptions of Mount Iwaki. He continued to rule from behind-the scenes during the tenure of his grandson, Tsugaru Nobuaki and great-grandson Tsugaru Nobuyasu as the domain fell further and further into debt. Nobuyasu's son, Tsugaru Nobuakira attempted reforms, but was vexed by corrupt officials and died under suspicious circumstances in 1791 without heir.

Tsugaru Yasuchika, son of the 5th Lord of Kuroishi, was appointed daimyō of Hirosaki to succeed Nobuakira. Under his tenure, the official kokudaka of the domain was raised from 47,000 to 70,000 and then to 100,000 koku to cover the expenses of dispatching military forces to Ezo to protect Japan's northern borders. Also under Yasuchika's tenure, Kuroishi was raised in status to become Kuroishi Domain, In 1821, during his sankin kōtai journey to Edo, he survived an assassination attempt by Sōma Daisaku, a former retainer of the Nanbu clan. Although Yasuchika was a noted reformer who attempted to strength the domain, he spent a tremendous amount of money attempting to arrange prestigious marriages for his incompetent son, Tsugaru Nobuyuki, which again plunged the domain into financial crisis. Nobuyuki was eventually forced out of office in 1839 and a complete outsider, the 7th son of rōjū Matsudaira Nobuakira, lord of Yoshida Domain in Mikawa Province was adopted into the Tsugaru clan as Tsugaru Yukitsugu. Yukitsugu managed to restore order and prosperity to the domain and modernized its military forces through increased implementation of rangaku studies.

== In the Boshin War ==
During the Boshin War of 1868-69, the Tsugaru clan under its final daimyō, Tsugaru Tsuguakira, first sided with the imperial government, and attacked the forces of the nearby Shōnai Domain. However, it soon switched course, and was briefly a signatory to the pact that created the Ōuetsu Reppan Dōmei, before backing out, once again in favor of the imperial government. It did not take part in any of the major military action against the imperial army. The Kuroishi branch joined the Hirosaki-Tsugaru in siding with the imperial government. As a result, the clan was able to evade the punishment meted out by the government on the northern domains. After northern Honshū was pacified, Tsugaru forces joined the imperial army in attacking the Republic of Ezo at Hakodate. In return for its assistance, the Meiji government granted the Tsugaru family of Hirosaki a 10,000 koku increase. Both branches of Tsugaru daimyo were made imperial governors (藩知事, han chiji) of their domains in 1869. Two years later, as with all other daimyo, both Tsugaru lines were relieved of their offices by the abolition of the han system.

== Meiji and beyond ==
In the Meiji era, Tsugaru Tsuguakira, was ennobled with the title of count (hakushaku) under the kazoku peerage system. Tsugaru Tsugumichi, the last daimyō of the Kuroishi-Tsugaru, became a viscount (shishaku). He later worked as a director of the Number 15 National Bank (第十五国立銀行, Dai jūgo kokuritsu ginkō), and Tsugumichi became a member of the House of Peers in 1890.

Tsugaru Tsuguakira had no son, and adopted the younger son of the court noble Konoe Tadafusa, who took the name of Tsugaru Hidemaru (津軽英麿; 1872–1919) to be his heir. Hidemaru was educated in Germany, graduating from the University of Bonn, Humboldt University of Berlin and University of Geneva and after his return to Japan served in under the Japanese Resident-General of Korea from 1907-1914, and in the Ministry of the Imperial Household from 1914-1918. In 1918, he was appointed to the House of Peers.

Hidemaru was succeeded by Tsugaru Yoshitaka (津軽義孝; 1907-1994), who was born as the second son of a branch of the Owari Tokugawa clan. As his mother was the daughter of Tsugaru Tsuguakira, he was adopted by Hidemaru as heir, becoming Count and chieftain of the clan in 1919. A noted equestrian, he was involved with the creation of the Japan Racing Association.

Yoshitaka's fourth daughter, Hanako, married Prince Hitachi, the younger son of Emperor Showa.

The main Tsugaru clan temple in Hirosaki is Chōshō-ji.

== Family heads ==
=== Main line (Hirosaki) ===
(as Ōura clan)

- Ōura Norinobu
- Ōura Motonobu
- Ōura Mitsunobu (1460–1526)
- Ōura Morinobu (1483–1538)
- Ōura Masanobu (1497–1541)
- Ōura Tamenori (1520–1567)

(as Tsugaru clan)

- Tsugaru Tamenobu (1550–1608)
- Tsugaru Nobuhira (1586–1631)
- Tsugaru Nobuyoshi (1619–1655)
- Tsugaru Nobumasa (1646–1710)
- Tsugaru Nobuhisa (1669–1746)
- Tsugaru Nobuaki (1719–1744)

(Tsugaru continued)

- Tsugaru Nobuyasu (1739–1784)
- Tsugaru Nobuakira (1762–1791)
- Tsugaru Yasuchika (1765–1833)
- Tsugaru Nobuyuki (1800–1862)
- Tsugaru Yukitsugu (1800–1865)
- Tsugaru Tsuguakira (1840–1916)
- Tsugaru Hidemaro (1872–1919)
- Tsugaru Yoshitaka (1907-1994)
- Tsugaru Shin

=== Branch line (Kuroishi) ===
As hatamoto

- Tsugaru Nobufusa (1620–1662)
- Tsugaru Nobutoshi (1646–1683)
- Tsugaru Masatake (1667–1743)
- Tsugaru Hisayo (1699–1758)
- Tsugaru Akitaka (1724–1778)
- Tsugaru Yasuchika (1765–1833)
- Tsugaru Tsunetoshi (1787–1805)

As tozama daimyō

- Tsugaru Chikatari (1788–1849, promoted to daimyō)
- Tsugaru Yukinori (1800–1865)
- Tsugaru Tsuguyasu (1821–1851)
- Tsugaru Tsugumichi (1840–1903)

== Notable retainers ==
=== Hirosaki ===
- Tsugaru Takehiro
- Numata Sukemitsu (d. c. 1612)
- Morioka Nobumoto (1546–1600)
- Kanehira Tsunanori
- Ogasawara Nobukiyo
- Hattori Yasunari
- Sugiyama Gengo (c. 1589 – c. 1641; 2nd son of Ishida Mitsunari)
- Daidōji Naohide (1552–1642)
- Daidōji Naohide (2nd) (d. 1636)
- Tatesada Nyui
- Mitugu Nyui(1712 - 1792)
- Shibue Chūsai (1805–1858)

== See also ==
- Hirosaki Domain
- Kuroishi Domain
- Nanbu clan
- Fujishiro Gozen
- Tsugaru Peninsula
