= Battle of Noheji =

Minor battle of the Boshin War

- Part of Boshin War
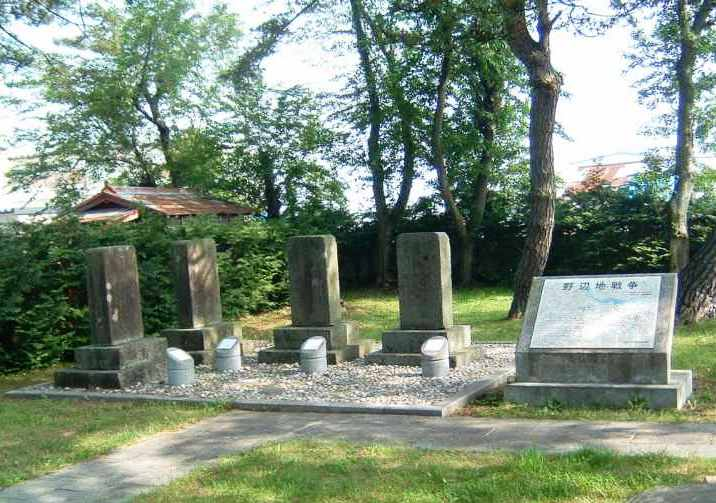
- Battle of Noheji Memorial, Noheji, Aomori
Date	November 7, 1868
Location	Noheji, Aomori 40°52′15″N 141°06′22″E
Result	Northern Alliance victory

Belligerents
Imperial faction: Hirosaki Domain; Kuroishi Domain	Ōuetsu Reppan Dōmei; Morioka Domain; Hachinohe Domain

Commanders and leaders
Yohei Tochiuchi; Masaji Ataka	Kimura Nosuke; Sakon Kojima; Eikichi Taniguchi

Strength
180 combatants	400 combatants

Casualties and losses
29	45

Battle of Noheji (Aomori Prefecture)

The Battle of Noheji (野辺地戦争, Noheji sensō) was a minor battle of the Boshin War of the Meiji Restoration in Japan on November 7, 1868. It is considered a part of the larger Aizu campaign. The site of the battlefield was designated an Aomori Prefectural Historic Site in 1976.

== Background ==
On September 20, 1868, the pro-Shōgunate Ōuetsu Reppan Dōmei was proclaimed at Morioka, the capital of the Nanbu clan who ruled Morioka Domain. The territory of the Nambu extended along the northeastern half of Mutsu Province, as far north as Shimokita Peninsula, and the Nambu controlled a subsidiary domain at Hachinohe. The Nambu clan's hereditary rivals dominated the northwest of Mutsu Province, the Tsugaru clan of Hirosaki Domain, with a subsidiary domain at Kuroishi.

The Tsugaru first sided with the pro-imperial forces of Satchō Alliance, and attacked nearby Shōnai Domain. However, the Tsugaru soon switched course, and briefly became a member of the Ōuetsu Reppan Dōmei. However, for reasons yet unclear, the Tsugaru backed out of the alliance and re-joined the imperial cause after a few months.

The village of Noheji in what is now part of Aomori Prefecture was an important port for the Nambu clan on Mutsu Bay. Noheji was garrisoned by approximately 400 men from Hachinohe Domain after the defection of the Tsugaru back to the imperial side. The port was shelled by Kubota Domain warship Shunyo-maru commanded by Saga Domain's Nakamuta Kuranosuke on September 10, but with little damage to the village or reported casualties.

== Battle ==
In the pre-dawn hours of September 23, a force of 180 men from Hirosaki and Kuroishi Domains, divided into three companies, converged on Noheji, capturing the outlying hamlet of Makado, which they fired, destroying 64 homes and one Buddhist temple. The Nambu garrison at Noheji responded to the fire, coming under attack as they approached the burning hamlet. The Nambu forces attempted to encircle the Tsugaru attackers to cut off their escape, with only partial success. In the ensuing melee, Tsugaru forces managed to penetrate into the village to almost within sight of the Nambu garrison headquarters before the death of their leader, Kojima Nagayoshi, sparked a retreat.

Accounts of the number of casualties of the battle vary widely. Based on the number of graves at the cemetery at Noheji, at least 27 men from both sides perished and were buried in the town. Per the official domain records from Hirosaki Domain, the Tsugaru clan lost 29 men, and similar records from the Nambu clan indicate losses of 45 men on the Nambu side.

== Aftermath ==
As a result of this minor skirmish, Tsugaru Domain was able to prove its defection from the Ōuetsu Reppan Dōmei and loyalty to the imperial cause. Tsugaru forces later joined the imperial army in attacking the Republic of Ezo at Hakodate. As a result, the entire clan was able to evade the punishment meted out by the government on the northern domains after the establishment of the Meiji government. On November 6, 1869, Hirosaki Domain dispatched two emissaries to Noheji, to meet with the leaders of Makado hamlet. The emissaries claimed that the Tsugaru clan had been forced into attacking Noheji under pressure from Saga Domain, and offered rice and timber for the rebuilding of the hamlet.
