= Hirosaki Domain =

Tozama domain of Edo period Japan

Hirosaki Domain 弘前藩
- Domain of Japan
- 1590–1871
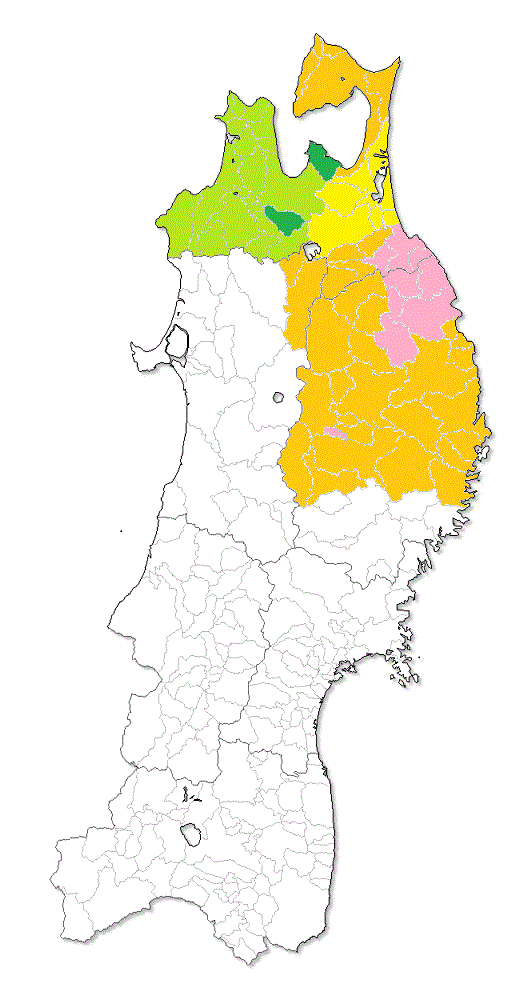
- Map of Nanbu and Tsugaru clan holdings in the late Edo period. Hirosaki Domain in light green, Kuroishi Domain in dark green; lands of the rival Nanbu Domain are in yellow and orange
- Capital: Hirosaki Castle
- Area
  - Coordinates: 40°36′25″N 140°27′52″E
  - Type: Daimyō
- Historical era: Edo period
  - Split from Nanbu clan holdings: 1590
  - Disestablished: 1871
Preceded by	Succeeded by
Mutsu Province	Hirosaki Prefecture
- Today part of: Aomori Prefecture

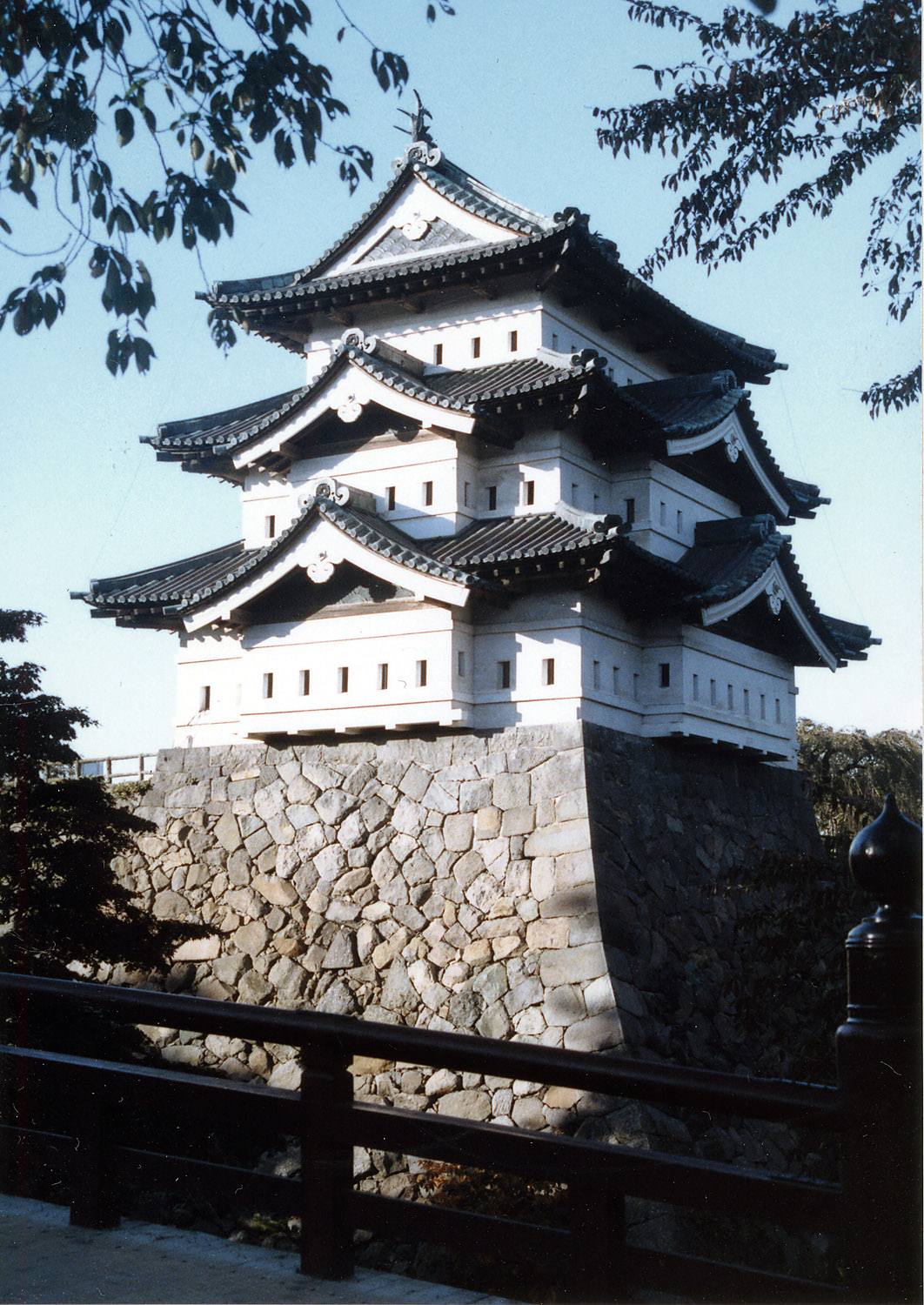
Hirosaki Castle, the seat of the Hirosaki Domain

Hirosaki Domain (弘前藩, Hirosaki-han), also known as Tsugaru Domain (津軽藩, Tsugaru-han), was a tozama feudal domain of Edo period Japan It is located in Mutsu Province, in northern Honshū. The domain was centered at Hirosaki Castle, located in the center of what is now the city of Hirosaki in Aomori Prefecture. It was ruled by the Tsugaru clan. A branch of the family ruled the adjoining Kuroishi Domain.

== History ==
=== Foundation ===
The Tsugaru clan, originally the Ōura clan (大浦氏, Ōura-shi), was of uncertain origins. According to later Tsugaru clan records, the clan was descended from the noble Fujiwara clan and had an accent claim to ownership of the Tsugaru region of northern Honshu; however, according to the records of their rivals, the Nanbu clan, clan progenitor Ōura Tamenobu was born as either Nanbu Tamenobu or Kuji Tamenobu, from a minor branch house of the Nanbu and was driven from the clan due to discord with his elder brother. In any event, the Ōura were hereditary vice-district magistrate (郡代補佐, gundai hosa) under the Nanbu clan's local magistrate Ishikawa Takanobu; however, in 1571, Tamenobu attacked and killed Ishikawa and began taking the Nanbu clan's castles in the Tsugaru region one after another. He captured castles at Ishikawa, Daikoji and Aburakawa, and soon gathered support of many former Nanbu retainers in the region. After pledging fealty to Toyotomi Hideyoshi, he was confirmed as an independent warlord in 1590 and changed his name to "Tsugaru". Tamenobu assisted Hideyoshi at the Battle of Odawara, and accompanied his retinue to Hizen during the Korean Expedition. Afterwards, he sided with Tokugawa Ieyasu during the Battle of Sekigahara in 1600.

=== History ===
After the Tokugawa victory at Sekigahara, the Tsugaru clan was granted an increase in territory, along with permission to keep its existing domain of Hirosaki (named for the family's castle town). However, Tamenobu maintained close ties with the Toyotomi. His eldest son served as a page to Toyotomi Hideyori and perished at the Siege of Osaka, and he married his second son and heir to a daughter of Ishida Mitsunari. He also provided shelter to a son of Ishida Mitsunari, making him a Tsugaru retainer.

Tamenobu was followed by his son, Tsugaru Nobuhira (ruled 1607–1631), who had been baptized as a Kirishitan. His inheritance was initially challenged by faction which supported his nephew in the Tsugaru Disturbance (津軽騒動, Tsugaru-sōdō) of 1607. He was married to a daughter of Ishida Mitsunari, but later set her aside and married a niece of Tokugawa Ieyasu to cement the clan's position vis-a-vis the Tokugawa shogunate. Nobuhira initially gave shelter to many Kirishitan persecuted in 1614, but later recanted his faith. He completed Hirosaki Castle, and developed the port of Aomori on Mutsu Bay.

Nobuhira was followed by his son, Tsugaru Nobuyoshi (ruled 1631–1655), whose period was marked by a series of major O-Ie Sōdō disturbances that shook the Tsugaru family: Kōsaka Kurando's Riot (高坂蔵人の乱, Kōsaka Kurando no ran) of 1612, the Funabashi Disturbance (船橋騒動, Funabashi-sōdō) of 1634, and the Shōhō Disturbance (正保騒動, Shōhō-sōdō) of 1647.

Tsugaru Nobumasa (ruled 1656–1710) was a scholar, and embarked on ambitious public works projects aimed at increasing the revenues of the domain. By around 1700, the domain's actual kokudaka had risen to around 300,000 koku through these efforts, although its official rating was unchanged. However, in 1695, crop failure resulted in widespread famine and starvation in the area. a tsunami struck the opposite shore and killed 1,467 people from Kumaishi to Matsumae. On 27 August 1741, more than 30 people were killed by a tsunami when a volcano on Oshima, northwest of the domain, collapsed.

His son, Tsugaru Nobuhisa (ruled 1710–1731) was also a noted scholar, and attempted to continue his father's public works projects, but was plagued by repeated eruptions of Mount Iwaki. Ignoring sumptuary laws imposed by the shogunate, he lived in luxury while his subjects and retainers fell deeper into poverty. He continued to rule behind-the-scenes during the time of his son, Nobuaki (ruled 1731–1744), during which time the castle town of Hirosaki burned down. His grandson, Nobuyasu (ruled 1744–1784) and great-grandson Nobuakira (ruled 1784–1791), inherited a domain deeply in debt, beset by corrupt retainers, constant eruptions by Mount Iwaki, crop failures and famine.

As Nobuakira died without heir, the domain was inherited by Tsugaru Yasuchika, from a hatamoto branch of the Tsugaru clan was founded in 1656 residing in Kuroishi. He promoted the branch house to daimyō status in 1809, He implemented many reforms which restored some stability to the domain, but orders from the Tokugawa shogunate to assist in policing the frontier region of Ezo (now Hokkaido), together with his efforts to secure a politically advantageous marriage for his son, placed a severe strain on the domain, and led to widespread peasant revolts. In 1821, he survived an assassination attempt by Sōma Daisaku, a former samurai of the Nanbu clan, stemming from the old enmity between the two clans. Yasuchika continued to rule behind-the-scenes during the time of his son, Nobuyuki (ruled 1825–1839), who was noted for his mismanagement.

Nobuyuki was followed by Tsugaru Yukitsugu (ruled 1839–1859), who was born as the 5th son of Matsudaira Nobuakira, daimyō of Yoshida Domain in Mikawa Province. He was adopted in 1821 as the heir to Tsugaru Chikatari, the 8th Lord Kuroishi, and 1st daimyō of Kuroishi Domain. On his adoptive father's retirement, as Tsugaru Yukinori, he became the 2nd daimyō of Kuroishi Domain from 1825 to 1839. After the shougnate bakufu forced Nobuyuki into retirement for gross misrule, Yukinori was ordered to change his name to Tsugaru Yukisugu and to take his place as the 11th daimyō of Hirosaki. He attempted to continue implementation many of the reforms initiated by Nobuakira to restore prosperity to the disaster-prone domain, expanding on Nobuakira's code of ethics from five articles to thirty in an attempt to control his unruly retainers. In addition to opening new paddy fields, Tsuguyasu established a foundry for the casting of cannons, and attempted to modernize the domain's military and medical level through the introduction of rangaku studies.

Yukitsugu's son Tsuguakira became the last daimyō of Tsugaru Domain during the turbulent Bakumatsu period, during which time the Tsugaru clan first sided with the pro-imperial forces of Satchō Alliance, and attacked nearby Shōnai Domain. However, the Tsugaru soon switched course, and briefly joined the Ōuetsu Reppan Dōmei. However, for reasons yet unclear, the Tsugaru backed out of the alliance and re-joined the imperial cause after a few months, participating in several battles in the Imperial cause during the Boshin War, notably that of the Battle of Noheji, and Battle of Hakodate.

After the Meiji Restoration, with the abolition of the han system, Yukitsugu was appointed Imperial Governor of Hirosaki from 1869 to 1871, at which time the territory was absorbed into the new Aomori Prefecture. He was later given the kazoku peerage title of hakushaku (Count).

The main Tsugaru family's funerary temple in Hirosaki was located at Chōshō-ji in Hirosaki, as well as the temple of Shinryō-in (a subsidiary of Kan'ei-ji) in Taitō-ku, Tokyo.

== List of daimyōs ==
- Tsugaru clan (tozama) 1590–1865

	Name	Tenure	Courtesy title	Court Rank	Kokudaka
1	Tsugaru Tamenobu (津軽 為信)	1590–1607	Ukyō-daifu	Lower 4th (従四位下)	45,000 koku
2	Tsugaru Nobuhira (津軽信枚)	1607–1631	Etchū-no-kami	Lower 5th (従五位下)	45,000 -> 47,000 koku
3	Tsugaru Nobuyoshi (津軽信義)	1631–1655	Tosa-no-kami	Lower 5th (従五位下)	47,000 koku
4	Tsugaru Nobumasa (津軽信政)	1656–1710	Etchū-no-kami	Lower 5th (従五位下)	47,000 koku
5	Tsugaru Nobuhisa (津軽信寿)	1710–1731	Tosa-no-kami	Lower 5th (従五位下)	47,000 -> 46,000 koku
6	Tsugaru Nobuaki (津軽信著)	1731–1744	Dewa-no-kami	Lower 5th (従五位下)	46,000 koku
7	Tsugaru Nobuyasu (津軽信寧)	1744–1784	Etchū-no-kami	Lower 5th (従五位下)	46,000 koku
8	Tsugaru Nobuakira (津軽信明)	1784–1791	Tosa-no-kami	Lower 5th (従五位下)	46,000 koku
9	Tsugaru Yasuchika (津軽寧親)	1791–1825	Saikyō-daifu, Jijū	Lower 4th (従四位下)	46,000 -> 70,000 -> 100,000 koku
10	Tsugaru Nobuyuki (津軽信順)	1825–1839	Dewa-No-Mami, Jijū	Lower 4th (従四位下)	100,000 koku
11	Tsugaru Yukitsugu (津軽順承)	1839–1859	Sakon-no-shogen	Lower 4th (従四位下)	100,000 koku
12	Tsugaru Tsuguakira (津軽承昭)	1859–1871	Tosa-no-kami, Jijū	Lower 4th (従四位下)	100,000 koku

== Bakumatsu period holdings ==
Unlike with most domains in the han system, Hirosaki Domain consisted of a continuous territory calculated to provide the assigned kokudaka, based on periodic cadastral surveys and projected agricultural yields. At the end of the Tokugawa shogunate, the domain consisted of the following holdings:

- Mutsu Province
  - 828 villages in Tsugaru District

== See also ==
- List of Han
