= Kan'ei-ji =

Buddhist temple in Toyoko, Japan

Coordinates: 35°43′17″N 139°46′28″E

Tōeizan Kan'ei-ji Endon-in
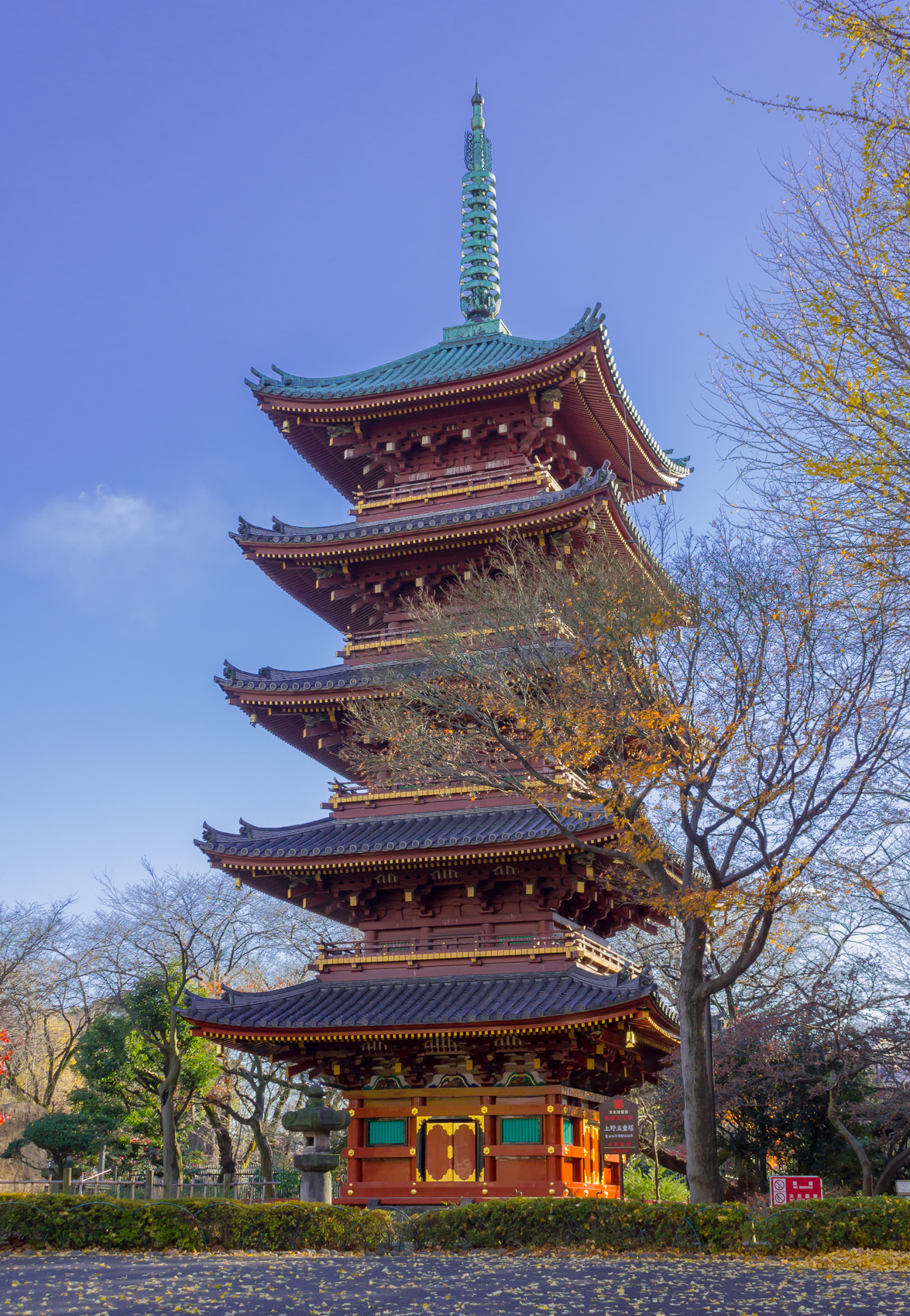
- Kan'ei-ji's original five-storied pagoda in Ueno

Religion
- Affiliation: Tendai

Location
- Location: Uenosakuragi 1-14-11, Taito-ku, Tokyo
- Country: Japan
- Interactive map of Tōeizan Kan'ei-ji Endon-in

Architecture
- Founder: Tenkai, Tokugawa Iemitsu
- Completed: 1625

Website
- www.kaneiji.jp (in Japanese)

Tōeizan Kan'ei-ji Endon-in (東叡山寛永寺円頓院) (also spelled Kan'eiji or Kaneiji) is a Tendai Buddhist temple in Tokyo, Japan, founded in 1625 during the Kan'ei era by Tenkai, in an attempt to emulate the powerful religious center Enryaku-ji, in Kyoto. The main object of worship is Yakushirurikō Nyorai (薬師瑠璃光如来).

It was named in a reference both to the Enryaku-ji's location atop Mount Hiei (Tōeizan means "Mount Hiei of the East"), and also after the era during which it was erected, like Enryaku-ji (named after the Enryaku year period). Because it was one of the two Tokugawa bodaiji (funeral temple; the other was Zōjō-ji) and because it was destroyed in the closing days of the war that put an end to the Tokugawa shogunate, it is inextricably linked to the Tokugawa shōguns.

Once a great complex, it used to occupy the entire heights north and east of Shinobazu Pond and the plains where Ueno Station now stands. It had immense wealth, power and prestige, and it once consisted of over 30 buildings. Of the 15 Tokugawa shōguns, six are buried here.

Many temple structures were destroyed in the great Meireki fire of 1657. A new hall was constructed inside the enclosure of Kan'ei-ji in 1698. The temple and its numerous annexes were almost completely destroyed during the Boshin War's Battle of Ueno and never restored. Much of the site where it once stood was confiscated and is now occupied by Ueno Park.

What is today the temple's main hall was taken from Kita-in in Kawagoe (Saitama Prefecture) and transferred to the site of a former Kan'ei-ji subtemple. Kan'ei-ji's five-story pagoda (photo above) and the Ueno Tōshō-gū shrine were amongst the gems of the old temple enclosure. Both stand undisturbed by the passage of years since the end of the Tokugawa shogunate.

The Shinobazu Pond itself and the Bentendō Temple which stands on its island used to be an integral part of Kan'ei-ji. Tenkai, liking Lake Biwa, had Benten Island built in imitation of Chikubushima, and then the Bentendō on it. At the time the island was accessible only by boat, but later a stone bridge was added on the east, making it possible to walk to it. The Bentendō Temple was destroyed during World War II, and the present one is a reconstruction.

== History ==
Tenkai wanted to create a powerful religious center and, to achieve that, he built Kan'ei-ji imitating Enryaku-ji. The temple was therefore erected north-east of Edo Castle to ward off evil spirits that were believed to come from that unlucky direction.

Tenkai's project enjoyed from the beginning the shogunate support, so much so that Tokugawa Hidetada in 1622 donated the land on which it was built. At the time, on that land there were the suburban residences of three daimyōs, (Tōdō Takatora of the Tsu domain, Tsugaru Nobuhira of the Hirosaki domain and Hori Naoyori of the Murakami domain), but the land was expropriated and donated to Tenkai for the temple. He was also given 50 thousand silver Ryō and a building as a contribution.

The chief abbot's residence, the Honbō, was built in 1625, which is considered the year of foundation of the temple. After that, several daimyōs contributed with the construction of other buildings. The main hall, called as in Enryaku-ji's case Konponchūdō, was finished only in 1697.

In 1643, after Tenkai's death, disciple Kōkai took his place. His successor was Emperor Go-Mizunoo's third son Shuchōho Shinnō. From then on until the end of the shogunate, Kan'ei-ji's chief abbots were chosen among the Emperor's children or favorite nephews and called with the honorific Rinnōjinomiya (輪王寺宮).

=== Tokugawa and Kan'ei-ji ===
With the favor of the Tokugawa the temple prospered but, at least in the first years since foundation, it was just the Tokugawa family temple, while the sole funeral temple of the Tokugawa was still Zōjō-ji, where the second shogun Hidetada rests. His successor Iemitsu sent his remains to Nikkō because the Nikkō Tōshō-gū, mausoleum of Tokugawa Ieyasu, founder of the dynasty, was there; he however also built a mausoleum at Kan'ei'ji. After that, the fourth shōgun Tokugawa Ietsuna and the fifth Tokugawa Tsunayoshi were put to rest in Ueno, and Kan'ei-ji became a Tokugawa funeral temple like Zōjō-ji. Zōjō-ji didn't like the change, but after the next shogun Tokugawa Ienobu's mausoleum was built on its land, the custom became to alternate the temples at each generation, and that lasted until the closing of the shogunate era. Excepted Ieyasu and Iemitsu (buried in Nikkō) and last shogun Yoshinobu (also known as Keiki, buried in nearby Yanaka Cemetery), all of the Tokugawa shōguns are buried either at Zōjō-ji or Kan'ei-ji, six at one and six at the other. In what used to be the Kan'ei-ji cemetery near the Tokyo National Museum are interred Tokugawa Ietsuna, Tokugawa Tsunayoshi, Tokugawa Yoshimune, Tokugawa Ieharu, Tokugawa Ienari, Tokugawa Iesada and Iesada's wife Tenshō-in. Ietsuna's and Tsunayoshi's mausoleums were destroyed in 1945. The cemetery is closed to the public, but can be seen from the street.

The last visit of a Tokugawa shogunate member was on the 8 August 1863 by Tenshō-in, for the memorial service of her husband Tokugawa Iesada.

=== Battle of Ueno and the destruction of Kan'ei-ji ===
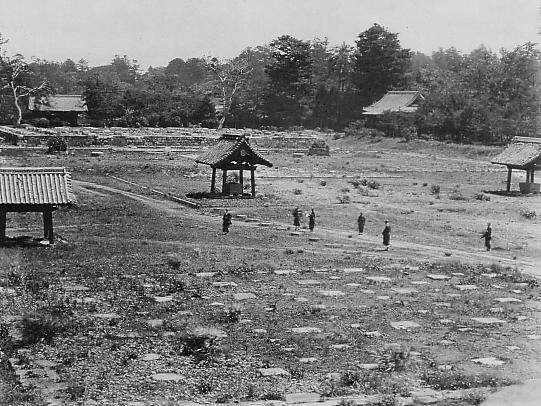
Devastation of Ueno after the battle. 1868 photograph.

In his book High City, Low City Japanologist Edward Seidensticker describes the last days and the destruction of Kan'ei-ji.

The revolutionary forces had occupied most of Tokyo, and Edo Castle and the majority of the Tokugawa troops had already surrendered, however one band of shogunate soldiers barricaded itself in Ueno with the intention to resist. About 2000 men strong, it was composed of members of the Shōgitai, a military unit of former Tokugawa retainers. They held the Kan'ei-ji's abbot in hostage, and maybe for this reason the Satsuma and Chōshū revolutionaries didn't attack immediately.

On July 4, 1868 (Meiji 1, 15th day of the 5th month), the final attack came and from early morning artillery rounds fell from Hongo's heights on Ueno. After a fierce battle, in the late afternoon the revolutionary forces broke through the defenses in the south at the Black Gate (the Kuromon), near what is today Ueno Park's entrance. There were altogether about 300 dead, mostly defenders. Most of the artillery rounds had gone astray, causing fires in which the whole Kan'ei-ji and up to a thousand houses were destroyed. The temple's abbot fled in disguise and left the city by boat.

== See also ==
- Ueno Tōshō-gū
