= Tsugaru Nobumasa =

Japanese Daimyo (1646–1710)

Tsugaru Nobumasa 津軽信政
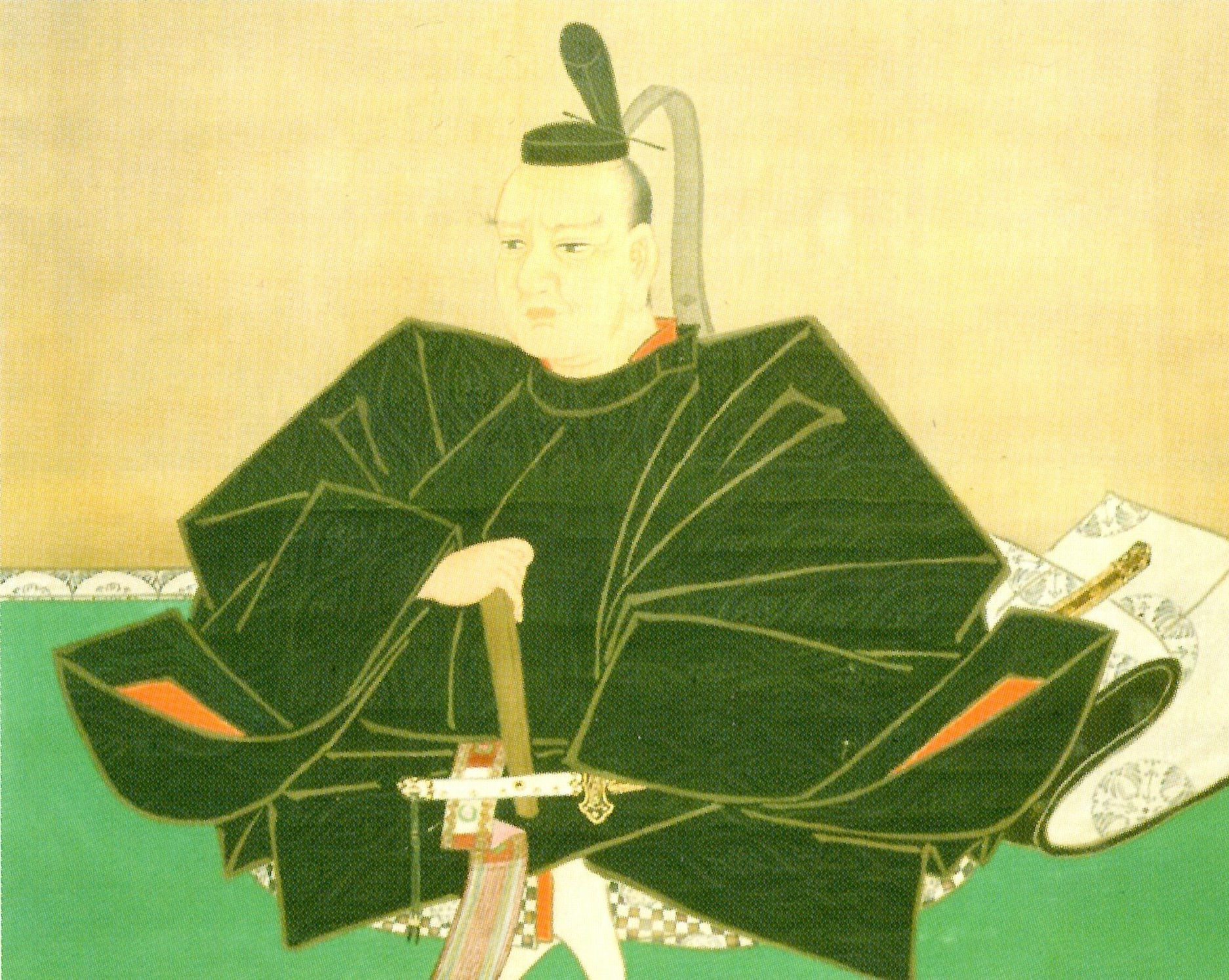
- Tsugaru Nobumasa
- Born: August 28, 1646; Hirosaki Castle, Japan
- Died: December 8, 1710 (aged 64); Hirosaki, Japan
- Occupation: Daimyō of Hirosaki Domain (1656–1710)
- Predecessor: Tsugaru Nobuyoshi
- Successor: Tsugaru Nobuhisa
- Parents: Tsugaru Nobuyoshi (father); daughter of Mashiyama Masatoshi, daimyō of Nishio Domain (mother)

Tsugaru Nobumasa (津軽 信政; August 28, 1646 – December 8, 1710) was the 4th daimyō of Hirosaki Domain in northern Mutsu Province, Honshū, Japan (modern-day Aomori Prefecture). His courtesy title was Etchū-no-kami, and his Court rank was Junior Fifth Rank, Lower Grade.

== Biography ==
Tsugaru Nobumasa was the eldest son of Tsugaru Nobuyoshi, 3rd daimyō of Hirosaki Domain and was born at Hirosaki Castle. He was 9 when his father died, and his uncle Tsugaru Nobufusa acted as regent until his coming of age. Of scholarly disposition, he studied in Edo (modern Tokyo) under the great Confucian scholar Yamaga Sokō, and Yoshikawa Koretaru. On assuming power in Hirosaki, he embarked on a large public works program, enlarging the castle town, developing the forestry industry, developing new paddy fields, flood control, and developing sericulture, textiles, silk, and paper as sources of local income. In 1660, he completed the construction of a 4.2 kilometer long dam to create Lake Tsugaru-Fushimi for irrigation purposes. It was the largest dam in Japan at the time. He also invited over 40 cultural figures to settle in Hirosaki to raise its level of culture.

His military forces were called to Ezo by the Tokugawa bakufu in the suppression of Shakushain's revolt, an Ainu uprising against Japanese rule in 1669, and was master-of-ceremonies at the shōgun's pilgrimage to Nikko in 1683.

However, in 1695 a crop failure resulted in famine in the Tsugaru area, and Hirosaki Domain lost 30,000 people. Nobumasa had 5 sons and 26 daughters. He died on December 8, 1710, and his grave is at the Takateru Jinja in Hirosaki. Nobumasa was succeeded by his eldest son, Tsugaru Nobuhisa.

== See also ==
- Tsugaru clan

Preceded by Tsugaru Nobuyoshi	4th Daimyō of Hirosaki; 1656–1710	Succeeded by Tsugaru Nobuhisa
