= Horikoshi Castle =

Castle in Aomori Prefecture, Japan

- 堀越城
- Hirosaki, Aomori Prefecture, Japan
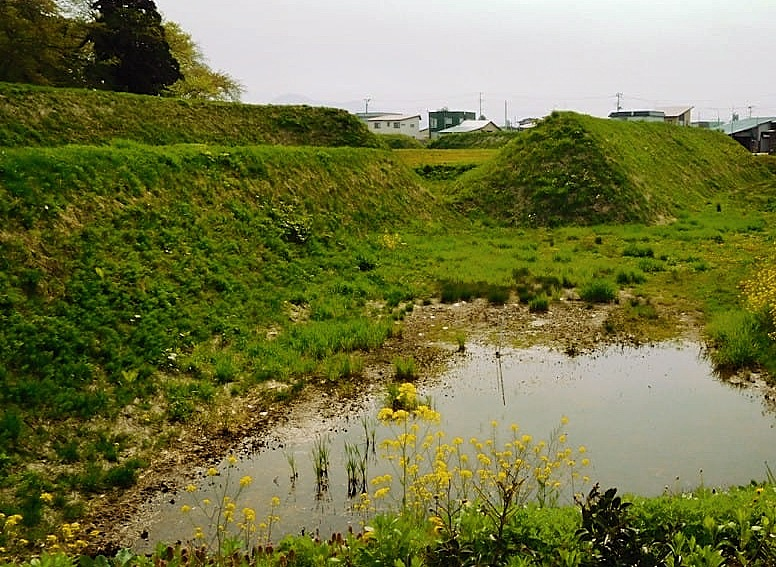
- Horikoshi Castle moat remnants

Site information
- Type: flatland-style Japanese castle
- Open to the public: yes
- Condition: ruins

Location
- Coordinates: 40°34′22″N 140°31′17″E

Site history
- Built: 1336
- Built by: Tsugaru clan
- In use: Sengoku period
- Demolished: 1615

Horikoshi Castle (堀越城, Horikoshi jō) was a Muromachi period Japanese castle located in what is now the city of Hirosaki, Aomori Prefecture, in the Tōhoku region of far northern Japan. It is protected by the central government as a National Historic Site, collectively with Hirosaki Castle and Tanesato Castle as the "Tsugaru clan Castle Sites".

== History ==
The first mention of a castle appears in documents dated 1336, when a partisan of the Northern Court, Soga Sadamitsu, is recorded as having built a fortification at this location. In 1571, Ōura Tamenobu gathered his forces at this location prior to storming Daibutsugahana Castle. In 1594, he moved his seat from Ōura Castle to this location, but later found it to be weak in defenses, and transferred to the newly built Hirosaki Castle in 1611. In 1615, in accordance with the Tokugawa shogunate's regulations that each daimyō could maintain only one castle, the fortifications were destroyed.

== Situation ==
Horikoshi Castle is located in the south Tsugaru Plain and was a flatland-style Japanese castle. An almost circular inner bailey was surrounded by moats and earthen ramparts, and was surrounded by a secondary enclosure and partially by a third enclosure, both of which were also protected by moats and earthen ramparts.

== Current situation ==
The ruins of the castle were eventually covered by farmland, with a Kumano Shrine occupying the site of the inner bailey. From 1975 to 1978, in conjunction with road work on the Hirosaki Bypass of Japan National Route 7, the ruins were "rediscovered", and an excavation was made on the third enclosure. The excavation revealed foundation posts for buildings and shards of celadon and white porcelain as well as lacquerware. Further excavations from 1998 to 2013 in the second enclosure found many forges located are found side by side, and many pots, mortars, and earthen crucibles used for blacksmithing, indicating that this was a production location for craftsmen to make iron and copper products, including iron nails, a parts of armor, and cannonballs.

The ruins were added to the National Historic Site designation for Hirosaki Castle in 1985, and Hirosaki City sponsored the creation of a historic park to open then site to the public.

== See also ==
- List of Historic Sites of Japan (Aomori)
