= Tsugaru Nobuyoshi =

Tsugaru Nobuyoshi 津軽信義
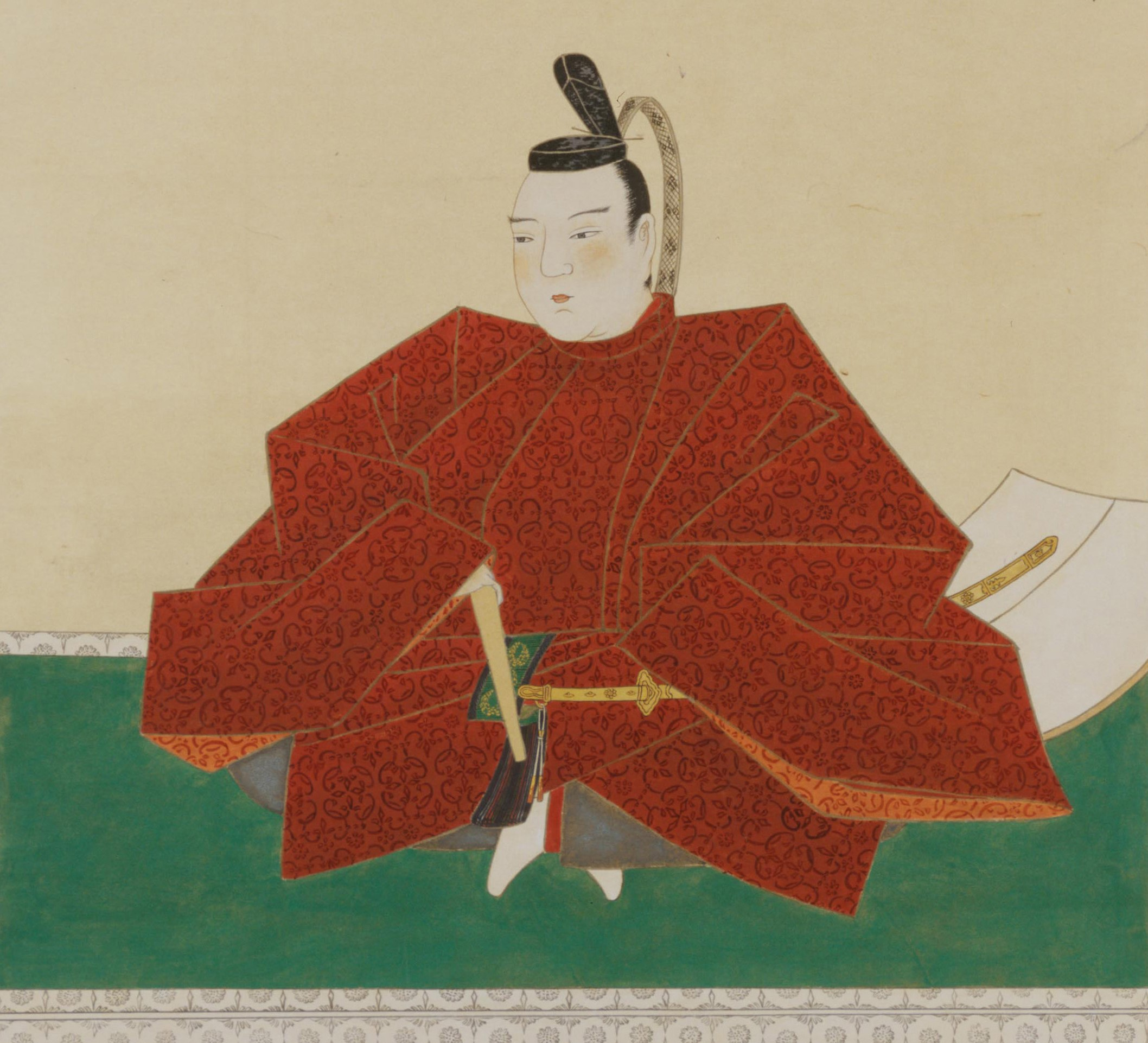
- Tsugaru Nobuyoshi
- Born: February 15, 1619; Kōzuke Province, Japan
- Died: December 22, 1655 (aged 36); Edo, Japan
- Occupation: Daimyō of Hirosaki Domain (1631–1655)
- Predecessor: Tsugaru Nobuhira
- Successor: Tsugaru Nobumasa
- Parents: Tsugaru Nobuhira (father); daughter of Ishida Mitsunari (mother)

Tsugaru Nobuyoshi (津軽 信義; February 15, 1619 – December 22, 1655) was the 3rd daimyō of Hirosaki Domain in northern Mutsu Province, Honshū, Japan (modern-day Aomori Prefecture). His courtesy title was Tosa-no-kami, and his Court rank was Junior Fifth Rank, Lower Grade.

== Biography ==
Tsugaru Nobuyoshi was the eldest son of Tsugaru Nobuhira, 2nd daimyō of Hirosaki Domain, and was born at the domain’s exclave located in Kōzuke Province. His mother, Tatsu-hime, was the daughter of Ishida Mitsunari and had been demoted to the status of concubine and exiled to Kōzuke when Nobuhira married Tokugawa Ieyasu’s niece to secure his position vis-à-vis the Tokugawa shogunate. He was brought to the domain(s Edo residence in 1623, on the death of his mother. He was still 13 years old when his father died, and was ordered to report before shōgun Tokugawa Iemitsu together with his younger half-brother Tsugaru Nobufusa on his accession to the lordship.

However, his position as the son of a concubine resulted in a split in the ranks of the senior retainers of Tsugaru Domain, with a large faction supporting Tsugaru Nobufusa due to his blood connection to the Tokugawa, and due to the fact that he was born as son of Nobuhira’s official wife. This resulted in an O-Ie Sōdō known as the Funahashi Sōdō of 1634, which was only suppressed with the assistance of the Tokugawa shogunate and which resulted in the exile of a number of Nobufusa’s supporters in 1636. Problems arose again in 1647 in what was called the Shōhō Sōdō, with remaining supporters of Nobufusa demanding that Nobuyoshi retire in favour of his younger half-brother, alleging misgovernment through excessive drinking and womanizing.

Nobuyoshi did have 25 sons and 26 daughters through a large number of concubines. However, he also continued his father’s works in increasing the production in his domain by developing new paddy fields, irrigation, and by developing copper and silver mines. He was also known as a waka poet.

Nobuyoshi died on December 22, 1655, at the clan residence in Kanda, Edo, at the age of 37. His grave is at the temple of Myōju-ji in Setagaya-ku, Tokyo, and also the Tsugaru clan temples of Chōshō-ji and Hōon-ji in Hirosaki. Four of his senior retainers decided to follow him in death by committing Junshi .

Nobuhira was succeeded by his eldest son, Tsugaru Nobumasa.

== See also ==
- Tsugaru clan

Preceded by Tsugaru Nobuhira	3rd Daimyō of Hirosaki; 1631–1655	Succeeded by Tsugaru Nobumasa
