= Tanesato Castle =

- 種里城
- Ajigasawa, Aomori Prefecture, Japan
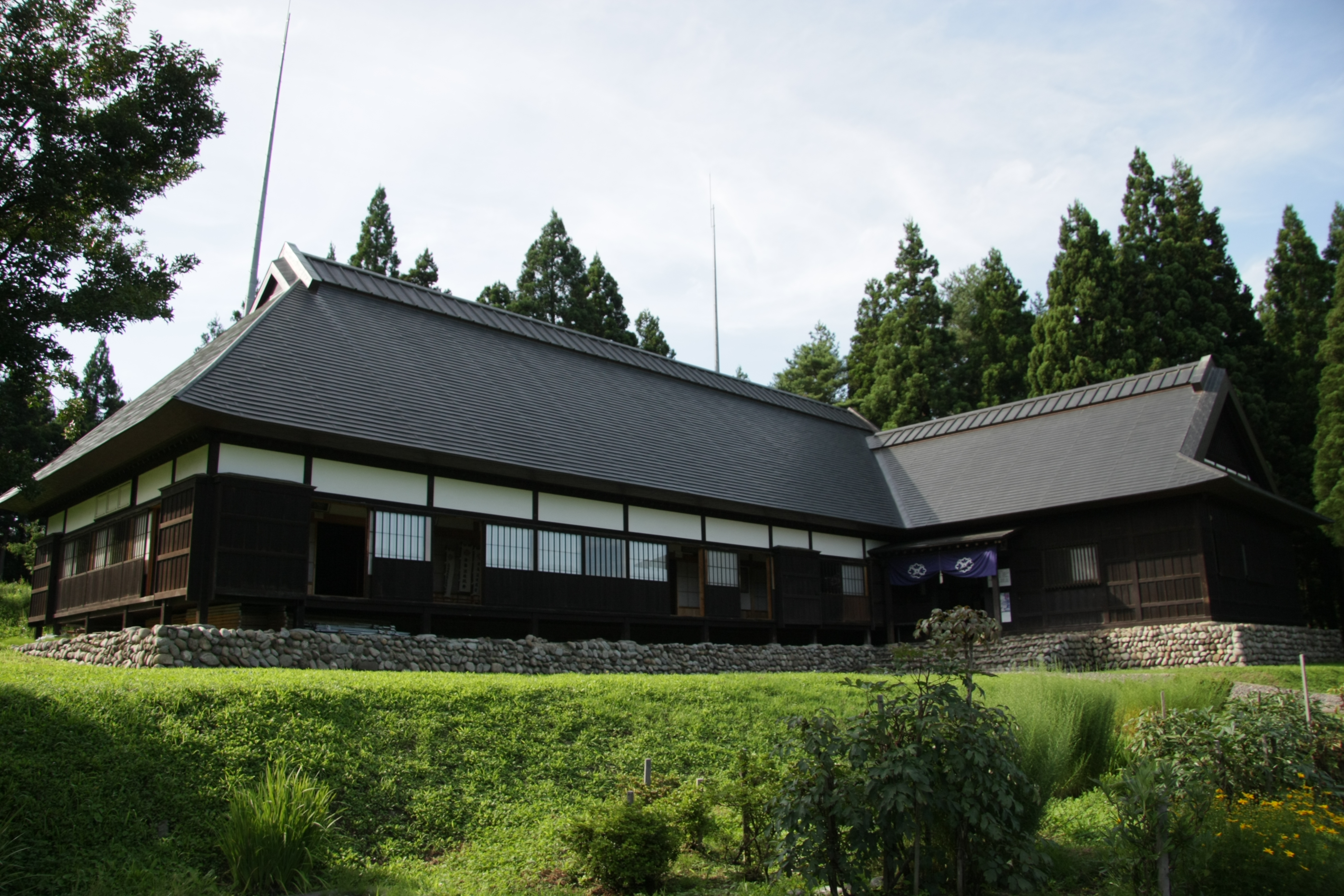
- Mitsnobu-no-yakata Museum

Site information
- Type: yamashiro-style Japanese castle
- Open to the public: yes
- Condition: ruins

Location
- Location within Aomori Prefecture Location within Japan
- Coordinates: 40°42′16″N 140°9′58″E

Site history
- Built: 1491
- Built by: Tsugaru clan
- In use: Sengoku period
- Demolished: 1615

Tanesato Castle (種里城, Tanesato jō) was a Muromachi period Japanese castle located in what is now the town of Ajigasawa, Aomori Prefecture, in the Tōhoku region of far northern Japan. The site has been protected by the central government as a National Historic Site, collectively with Hirosaki Castle and Horikoshi Castle as the "Tsugaru clan Castle Sites" since 2002.

== Situation ==
Tanesato Castle was located to the west of the center of modern Ajigasawa, in the hills on the banks of the Akaishi River, which forms part of the natural defences of the castle.

== History ==
Tanesato Castle was constructed around 1491 by Ōura Mitsunobu, the progenitor of the Tsugaru clan, under orders from the Nanbu clan to counter to their rivals, the Andō clan who controlled Tosaminato Port on the Sea of Japan. The ancestry of Ōura Mitsunobu is uncertain, and it appears that he was born in this area. He died at Tanesato Castle in 1526 and, according to legend, was buried seated in full armor within the castle grounds.

The castle remained in use until the early Edo period, when it was destroyed in accordance with the Tokugawa shogunate’s law of 1615 prohibiting more than one castle per feudal domain. However, the site was kept in good preservation until the Meiji restoration as a sacred ground for Hirosaki Domain.

== Current situation ==
In 1988 a museum was built on the site, which underwent archaeological excavation from 1991-1995. The site was proclaimed a National Historic Site in 2002.

The castle site is 40 minutes by bus from Ajigasawa Station on the JR East Gono Line.

== See also ==
- List of Historic Sites of Japan (Aomori)
