= Tsugaru Nobuhira =

- 津軽信枚
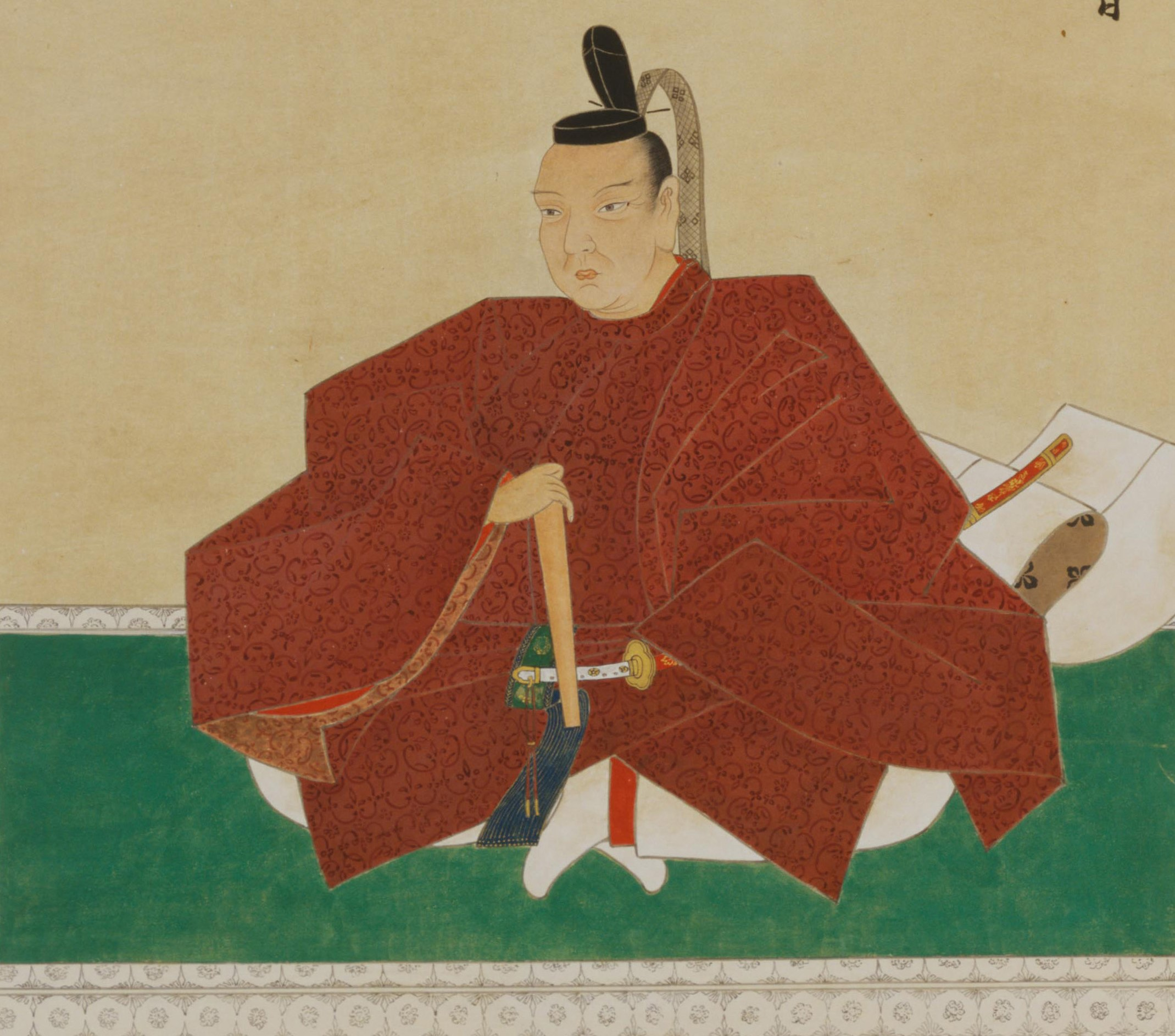
- Portrait of Tsugaru Nobuhira
- Born: May 9, 1586
- Died: February 14, 1631 (aged 44); Edo, Japan
- Burial place: Shinryō-in, Taitō, Tokyo, Japan
- Other names: Ōura Nobuhira
- Title: Daimyō of Hirosaki Domain
- Term: 1607–1631
- Predecessor: Tsugaru Tamenobu
- Successor: Tsugaru Nobuyoshi
- Spouse(s): daughter of Ishida Mitsunari niece of Tokugawa Ieyasu
- Father: Tsugaru Tamenobu

Tsugaru Nobuhira (津軽 信枚; May 9, 1586 – February 14, 1631) was the second daimyō of Hirosaki Domain in northern Mutsu Province, Honshū, Japan (modern-day Aomori Prefecture). His courtesy title was Etchū-no-kami, and his Court rank was Junior Fifth Rank, Lower Grade.

== Biography ==
Tsugaru Nobuhira was born in 1586 as the third son of Ōura Tamenobu, head of the Ōura clan. In 1596, with his two elder brothers Nobutake and Nobukata, he is known to have converted to Christianity.

In 1600, at the Battle of Sekigahara, he accompanied his father as part of Tokugawa Ieyasu's Eastern Army, and served in Ieyasu's retinue. At the same time, his elder brother Nobutake was at Osaka Castle and served as a page to Toyotomi Hideyori. This was a similar situation as with the Sanada clan, where two brothers fought on opposing sides, which ensured the clan's survival whichever side won. Ōura Tamenobu was also on good terms with Ishida Mitsunari, the leader of the pro-Toyotomi Western Army, and provided protection for Ishida's son and daughter in Tsugaru after the defeat of the Western Army. As a reward for his services at the battle of Sekigahara, the clan was given only a nominal 2000 koku increase in kokudaka with an estate in Kōzuke Province. Also after the battle, Ōura Tamenobu changed the clan name to "Tsugaru".

On Tamenobu’s death in 1607, Nobuhira became head of the Tsugaru clan over the objections of a faction which supported his nephew Tsugaru Kumachiyo (1600–1623), the young son of Nobutake. This was the first of many O-Ie Sōdō internal conflicts in the Tsugaru clan during the Edo period. An O-Ie Sōdō placed the domain in danger of attainer, but the issue was resolved through the arbitration of the Tokugawa shogunate giving Nobuhira the title of daimyō.

From 1609 to 1611, Nobuhira rushed to complete Takaoka Castle, demolishing other castles in his domains for buildings and materials to speed up construction. The completed castle, with its huge five-story donjon was on a scale far larger than typical for a 47,000 koku daimyō. To secure his position vis-à-vis the Tokugawa shogunate, he married Tokugawa Ieyasu's niece (the widow of Fukushima Masayuki), Mate-hime (1589–1638). Nobuhira was already married at the time to Tatsu-hime, a daughter of Ishida Mitsunari. She was demoted in status to concubine and exiled to the clan's small subsidiary holding in Kozuke Province.

In 1614, Nobuhira dispatched his forces in support of the Tokugawa at the Osaka Winter Campaign. He was ordered initially remain on garrison duty in Edo before being told to return to his home domain to guard against unrest from other northern domains who might come out in support of the Toyotomi. In June 1619, Ieyasu demoted Fukushima Masanori from Hiroshima Domain to Hirosaki Domain, with the Tsugaru clan ordered to be transferred to Echigo Province. The Tsugaru clan strongly protested this move and, through the assistance of the influential priest Nankōbō Tenkai, were able to get the Fukushima clan transferred to Nakajima Domain in Shinano Province instead.

In September 1627, a lightning strike set the five-story donjon of Takaoka Castle on fire, which caused a warehouse filled with gunpowder to explode. The fire quickly spread to other parts of the castle and surrounding castle town. The castle was rebuilt on a smaller scale, and was renamed Hirosaki Castle in August 1628. Nobuhira developed Aomori port on Mutsu Bay as a main port for shipping to Edo, and for transit to the northern island of Ezo. He took steps to increase the rice production in his province by developing new paddy fields, irrigation, and by bringing in craftsmen and artisans from other parts of Japan.

Nobuhira died on January 14, 1631, at the clan residence in Edo. His grave is at the temple of Shinryō-in (a subsidiary of Kan'ei-ji) in Taitō-ku, Tokyo.

Nobuhira was succeeded by his eldest son, Tsugaru Nobuyoshi by his first wife Tatsuhime. Nobuhira had nine sons and four daughters. His second son, Tsugaru Nobufusa, by his second wife Mate-hime was given a 5000 koku hatamoto holding in Kuroishi, and was the ancestor of the future daimyō of Kuroishi Domain.

== See also ==
- Tsugaru clan

Preceded by Tsugaru Tamenobu	2nd Daimyō of Hirosaki; 1607–1631	Succeeded by Tsugaru Nobuyoshi
