= Tsugaru Tamenobu =

Japanese Daimyo (1550–1607)

- 津軽 為信
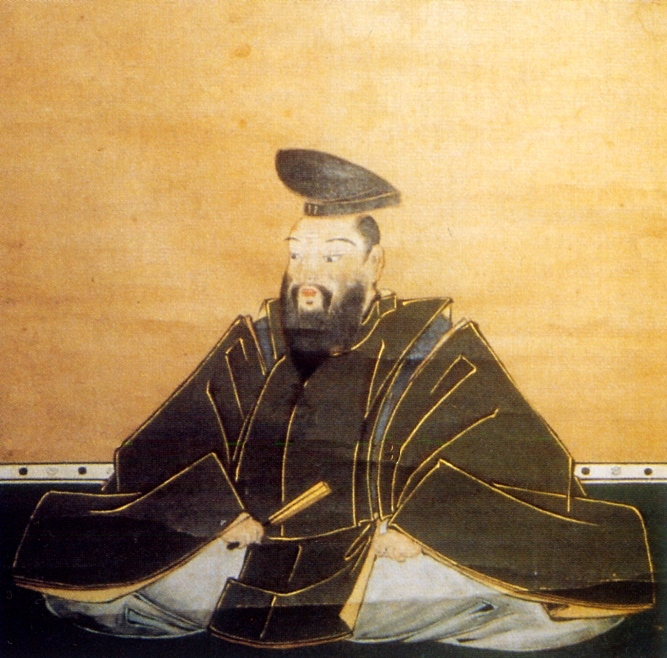
- Born: January 18, 1550
- Died: March 29, 1607 (aged 57); Kyoto, Japan
- Burial place: Kakushū-ji, Hirosaki, Aomori, Japan
- Other name: Ōura Tamenobu
- Title: Daimyō of Hirosaki Domain
- Successor: Tsugaru Nobuhira
- Spouse: daughter of Ōura Tamenori
- Father: Ōura Morinobu

Tsugaru Tamenobu (津軽 為信; January 18, 1550 – March 29, 1607) was a Sengoku period Japanese daimyō and the first daimyō of Hirosaki Domain under the Tokugawa shogunate. He was born as Ōura Tamenobu and was a hereditary retainer of the Nanbu clan. However, he later rebelled against the Nanbu, establishing an independent domain. During this time, he renamed himself Tsugaru Tamenobu.

== Early life ==
Tamenobu was born on January 18, 1550, as the adopted son and heir of Ōura Tamenori, a retainer of the Nanbu clan, based at Sannohe Castle. He succeeded his father in 1567 or 1568 as castellan of Ōura Castle, located in what is now part of the city of Hirosaki. According to later Tsugaru clan records, the clan was descended from the noble Fujiwara clan and had an ancient claim to ownership of the Tsugaru region of northern Honshu. However, according to the records of their rivals, the Nanbu clan, Tamenobu was born as either Nanbu Tamenobu or Kuji Tamenobu, from a minor branch house of the Nanbu and was driven from the clan due to discord with his elder brother. In any event, the Ōura were hereditary vice-district magistrate (郡代補佐, gundai hosa) under the Nanbu clan's local magistrate Ishikawa Takanobu. In 1571, Tamenobu attacked and killed Ishikawa. One after another, he took the Nanbu clan's castles in the Tsugaru region. He captured castles at Ishikawa, Daikoji and Aburakawa, and he soon gathered the support of many former Nanbu retainers in the region.

== Independence from the Nanbu ==
In 1582, with the death of Nanbu Harumasa, the Nanbu clan collapsed into numerous factions. The 25th hereditary clan chieftain, Nanbu Harutsugu, was a boy of 13 who soon died under uncertain circumstances. Following Harutsugu's death, the Kunohe branch of the clan under the warlord Kunohe Masazane began to expand its influence over the Sannohe main branch. Given these circumstances, Tamenobu declared the western Nanbu territories under his control would be independent from Nanbu rule. Proclaimed a traitor by the Nanbu clan, rivals Nanbu Nobunao and Kunohe Masazane both called for Tamenobu's death. Tamenobu successfully took castle after castle in the region due to the divided state of the Nanbu clan, but realizing that in the long term he would need to solicit outside help, he approached the Mogami clan for an introduction to the regime of Toyotomi Hideyoshi. Tamenobu initially departed by boat from Ajigasawa, but inclement winds blew the boat north as far as Matsumae. He made attempts to reach Hideyoshi overland in 1586, 1587, and 1588, but he was blocked each time by hostile forces in the territories to the south of Tsugaru.

== Service under Hideyoshi ==
In 1589, Tamenobu approached Ishida Mitsunari with gifts of horses and falcons for Toyotomi Hideyoshi, and asked for formal recognition as daimyō over his existing holdings (i.e. the three Tsugaru districts of Hiraga, Hanawa and Inaka of far northwestern Mutsu Province). The area has had a formally assessed kokudaka of 45,000 koku. Tamenobu, accompanied by 18 of his closest vassals, participated in the Siege of Odawara in 1590, and was received in audience by Hideyoshi. Nanbu Nobunao, supported by Maeda Toshiie declared Tamenobu to be a rebellious vassal who had seized the Tsugaru region illegally, and demanded his punishment. Tamenobu was supported by Ishida Mitsunari, Hashiba Hidetsugu and Oda Nobukatsu and as he had pledged fealty to Hideyoshi earlier than Nanbu Nobunao, his claims to Tsugaru were officially recognised.

Tamenobu also revived his clan's claims to have been descended from the Fujiwara clan and made lavish presents to the kampaku Konoe Sakihisa into order to receive former recognition of this claim. He also changed his family name from Ōura to Tsugaru at this time. In 1591, he accompanied Toyotomi forces in the suppression of the Kunohe Rebellion. During Hideyoshi's invasion of Korea, he was stationed at Fushimi Castle near Kyoto, and in 1597 moved his seat from Ōura Castle to Horikoshi Castle.

== Battle of Sekigahara ==
In 1600, Tamenobu received the courtesy title of Ukyo-no-daifu. With his third son, Tsugaru Nobuhira, he participated in the Battle of Sekigahara as part of the Eastern Army under Tokugawa Ieyasu. His eldest son, Tsugaru Nobutake, was serving Toyotomi Hideyori at the time as a page in Osaka Castle. So, the situation of the Tsugaru clan was similar to that of the Sanada clan in that it was divided between the two armies. After the battle, he took in the orphaned children of Ishida Mitsunari and provided them shelter in Tsugaru. He later married Nobuhira to Mitsunari's daughter. His reward for his efforts at the Battle of Sekigahara were remarkably low - only an additional 2000 koku in Kozuke Province, which brought his kokudaka to 47,000 koku.

Tamenobu also feared a rebellion within his domains during his absence and had the suspected leader, Morioka Nobumoto, put to death before his departure. The rebellion occurred anyway, and the rebels briefly occupied Horikoshi Castle. After receiving word of the Western Army's defeat, they surrendered without a fight. Afterwards, Tamenobu decided to relocate his seat to a location called Takaoka, sandwiched between the Iwaki River and the Tabuchi River. Here, he began work on a new castle on a massive scale. The new castle was Hirosaki Castle.

In 1607, Tamenobu received word that his eldest son, Nobutatsu, was ill in Kyoto and set out from Hirosaki to visit him. However, Nobutake died in October, before Tamenobu arrived, and Tamenobu himself died in Kyoto in January the next year at the age of 58. His grave is at the Tsugaru clan temple of Kakushū-ji in Hirosaki.

As Tamenobu's second son, Nobukata, had died in 1597, the title went to his third son, Nobuhira. This immediately resulted in an O-Ie Sōdō, as many retainers felt that Nobutake's son was the legitimate heir. However, the Tokugawa shogunate intervened and proclaimed Nobuhira as the next daimyō.

== Notes ==
| Preceded by none | 1st Daimyō of Hirosaki; 1590–1607 | Succeeded by Tsugaru Nobuhira |
