= List of Japanese architects =

The following is a chronological list of notable Japanese architects.

== Pre Meiji period, Meiji period (1868–1911), Taishō Period (1912–1925), Shōwa Period (1926–1945) ==
Latin transcription	Japanese name	birth and death date
Shimizu Kisuke II	二代清水喜助	1815–1881
Fukukishi Kanda	神田福吉	1824-?
Tomokata Tatekawa	立川知方	1825-1894
Kiko Adachi	安達喜幸	1827-1884
Tateishi Kiyoshige	立石清重	1829–1894
Ito Heizaemon IX	伊藤平左衛門	1829–1913
Kuniaki Fujishima	藤島邦明	1834-?
Hayashi Tadayoshi	林忠恕	1835–1893
Katsufumi Shirakawa	白川勝文	1838-?
Kiyoshige Yamada	山田清重	1841-?
Oshima Mitsutomo	大島盈株	1842–1925
Kenkichi Takahashi	高橋兼吉	1845-1894
Kiko Kiyoyoshi	木子清敬	1845–1907
Horie Sakichi	堀江佐吉	1845–1907
Tadaharu hara	原忠治	1849-?
Taisuke Chōgō	長郷泰輔	1849-1911
Sone Tatsuzō	曽禰達蔵	1852–1937
Katayama Tōkuma	片山東熊	1853–1917
Yamamoto Jihei	山本治兵衛	1854–1919
Tatsuno Kingo	辰野金吾	1854–1919
Iwahito Nakamura	中村岩人	1854-?
Kuru Masamichi	久留正道	1855–1914
Watanabe Jo	渡辺譲	1855–1930
Kawai Koya	河合浩蔵	1856–1934
Naoaki Yamaguchi	山口直昭	1856-?
Shige Yoshii	吉井茂則	1857 -1930
Tokusaburoh Koumo	河面徳三郎	1857-?
Minosuke Yada	八田巳之助	1857-?
Satate Shichijiro	佐立七次郎	1857–1922
Niinomi Takamasa	新家孝正	1857–1922
Kojima Noriyuki	小島憲之	1857–1918
Yamaguchi Hanroku	山口半六	1858–1900
Matsugazaki Mutsunaga	松崎万長	1858–1921
Michinaga Matsusaki	松崎万長	1858-1921
Katsuji Shibata	柴田勝治	1859-?
Tsumaki Yorinaka	妻木頼黄	1859–1916
Okada Tokitaro	岡田時太郎	1859–1926
Nakamura Tatsutaro	中村達太郎	1860–1942
Kawamura Izo	河村伊蔵	1860–1940
Taki Daikichi	滝大吉	1862–1902
Gantaro Takahashi	高橋巌太郎	1863-1938
Masumoto Ohhara	小原益知	?-?
Masatoshi Higuchi	樋口正峻	?-?
Minori Ikeda	池田稔	?-?
Kiyoemon Honjo	本城清右衛門	?-?
Takaji Tsuda	津田皋二	?-?
Shige Shogoro	茂庄五郎	1863–1913
Kasai Manji	葛西萬司	1863–1942
Oki Roto	仰木魯堂	1863–1941
Ito Tamekichi	伊藤為吉	1864–1943
Sou Hyousou	宗兵蔵	1864–1944
Shitara Sadao	設楽貞雄	1864–1943
Yokogawa Tamisuke	横河民輔	1864–1945
Suekichi Kameoka	亀岡末吉	1865-1922
Chiyotaro Tenaka	手中千代太郎	1866-?
Shimoda Kikutaro	下田菊太郎	1866–1931
Ishii Keikichi	石井敬吉	1866–1932
Endo Oto	遠藤於莵	1866–1943
Shiga Shigetura	滋賀重列	1866–1936
Osawa Sannosuke	大澤三之助	1867–1945
Nagano Uheiji	長野宇平治	1867–1937
Itō Chūta	伊東忠太	1867–1954
Mihashi Siro	三橋四郎	1867–1915
Sekino Tadashi	関野貞	1868–1935
Yamashita Kejiro	山下啓次郎	1868–1931
Tetsuzoh Kawasaki	川崎鉄三	?-1932?
Eizaburoh Ichiishi	市石英三郎	?-?
Takashi Ohga	大賀隆	?-?
Michitaroh Kanda	神田道太郎	?-?
Chujo Seiichiro	中條精一郎	1868–1936
Nomura Ichiro	野村一郎	1868–1942
Tsukamoto Yasushi	塚本靖	1869–1937
Noguchi Magoichi	野口孫市	1869–1915
Matsunosuke Moriyama	森山松之助	1869–1949
Yahashi Kenkichi	矢橋賢吉	1869–1927
Watanabe Fukuzo	渡辺福三	1870–1920
Suzuki Teiiji	鈴木禎次	1870–1941
Hiromichi Tsuda	津田弘道	1870-1931
Sakurai Kotaro	桜井小太郎	1870–1953
Yamada Shichijiro	山田七五郎	1871–1945
Takeda Goichi	武田五一	1872–1938
Matsumuro Shigemitsu	松室重光	1873–1937
Kiyoshi Inouye	井上清	1874-1939
Kiko Kozaburo	木子幸三郎	1874–1941
Hidaka Yutaka	日高胖	1875–1952
Yasushi Kataoka	片岡安	1876–1946
Ooe Shintaro	大江新太郎	1876–1935
Yutaroh Kagoya	加護谷祐太郎	1876-1936
Kohzoh Kitamura	北村耕造	1877-1939
Okuma Yoshikuni	大熊喜邦	1877–1952
Yasuoka Katsuya	保岡勝也	1877–1942
Kyozo Nagase	永瀬狂三	1877–1955
Sato Koichi	佐藤功一	1878–1941
Mamoru Tamura	田村鎮	1878-1942
Ninzaburoh Shimizu	清水仁三郎	1878-1951
Choichi Yoshitake	吉武長一	1879-1953
Minoru Kouda	古宇田實	1879-1965
Tetsukawa Yosuke	鉄川与助	1879–1976
Ide Kaoru	井手薫	1879–1944
Kunieda Hiroshi	國枝博	1879–1943
Tanabe Junkichi	田辺淳吉	1879–1926
Yoshitake Choichi	吉武長一	1879–1953
Nakamura Yoshihei	中村與資平	1880–1963
Sano Toshitaka	佐野利器	1880–1956
Yokohama Ben	横濱勉	1880–1960
Kadono Soichiro	葛野壮一郎	1880–1944
Oshio Akira	置塩章	1881–1968
Ken Kurata	倉田謙	1881-1940
Fukutaroh Kobayashi	小林福太郎	1882-1938
Ryutaro Furuhashi	古橋柳太郎	1882-1961
Kuno Misao	久野節	1882–1962
Motono Seigo	本野精吾	1882–1944
Matsui Kantaro	松井貴太郎	1883–1962
Goto Keiji	後藤慶二	1883–1919
Mikishi Abe	阿部美樹志	1883–1965
Okada Shinichirō	岡田信一郎	1883–1932
Sato Shiro	佐藤四郎	1883–1974
Yonezoh Kitami	北見米造	1883-1964
Shizuo Suzuki	鈴木鎮雄	1884-1968
Yasui Takeo	安井武雄	1884–1955
Nishimura Isaku	西村伊作	1884–1963
Yakushiji Kazue	薬師寺主計	1884–1965
Watanabe Setsu	渡辺節	1884–1967
Yamada Jun	山田醇	1884–1969
Yoshikazu Uchida	内田祥三	1885–1972
Namie Yasuo	波江悌夫	1885–1965
Hasebe Eikichi	長谷部鋭吉	1885–1960
Masao Takamatsu	高松政雄	1885-1934
Miki Nagayama	永山美樹	1886-1949
Toru Tsujioka	辻岡通	1886-1955
Nishimura Yoshitoki	西村好時	1886–1961
Yoshitake Tori	吉武東里	1886–1945
Tachū Naitō	内藤多仲	1886–1970
Hitoshi (Jin) Watanabe	渡辺仁	1887–1973
Kiko Shichiro	木子七郎	1887–1955
Junpei Nakamura	中村順平	1887–1977
Takashi Sunami	角南隆	1887–1980
Shigekazu Sugino	杉野繁一	1887–1973
Shigeyoshi Fukuda	福田重義	1887–1971
Ghoji Yoshida	吉田享二	1887–1951
Toshiro Yamashita	山下寿郎	1888–1983
Kenzo Takekoshi	竹腰健造	1888–1981
Wajiro Kon	今和次郎	1888–1973
Kiyoshi Masuda	増田清	1888–1977
Koji Fujii	藤井厚二	1888–1938
Muraji Shimomoto	下元連	1888–1984
Matakichi Yabe	矢部又吉	1888–1941
Sada Horiuchi	堀内貞	1888-?
Kiyoshi Masuda	増田清	1888-1977
Goro Kitazawa	北沢五郎	1889-1964
Masahei Matsuda	松田昌平	1889-1976
Tadashi Takemura	武村忠	1889-1976
Arata Endo	遠藤新	1889–1951
Yotaro Sekine	関根要太郎	1889–1959
Yonekichi Takeda	竹田米吉	1889–1976
Setsuro Yamamoto	山本拙郎	1890–1944
Mamoru Nakamura	中村鎮	1890–1933
Tokusaburo Kimura	木村得三郎	1890–1958
Masatsugu Kobayashi	小林正紹	1890–1980
Sutejiroh Umezawa	梅澤捨次郎	1890-1958
Takeo Ushiki	宇敷赳夫	1891-?
Togo Murano	村野藤吾	1891–1984
Toshijiko Noda	野田俊彦	1891–1932
Michio Mitsui	三井道男	1891-1970
Hatsutaro Miyauchi	宮内初太郎	1892-?
Hiroshi Nakamura	中村寛	1892-?
Kenjiro Maeda	前田健二郎	1892-1975
Otohiko Honma	本間乙彦	1892–1937
Shinzaburoh Shimizu	清水新三郎	?-?
Risuke Kobayashi	小林利助	?-1970
Bunzo Fujida	藤田文蔵	?-1978
Keisuke Nagasaki	長崎桂介	?-1981
Kenjiro Maeda	前田健二郎	1892–1975
Teitaro Takahashi	高橋貞太郎	1892–1970
Isaburo Ueno	上野伊三郎	1892–1972
Eizo Sugawara	菅原栄蔵	1892–1967
Masaharu Furutsuka	古塚正治	1892–1976
Tsuyoshi Ogura	小倉強	1893–1980
Roku Iwamoto	岩元禄	1893–1922
Kikuji Ishimoto	石本喜久治	1894–1963
Yamada Mamoru	山田守	1894–1966
Yoshida Tetsuro	吉田鉄郎	1894–1956
Imakita Otokichi	今北乙吉	1894–1942
Hirabayashi Kingo	平林金吾	1894–1981
Isoya Yoshida	吉田五十八	1894–1974
Gunpei Matsuda	松田軍平	1894–1981
Shohgoroh Okada	岡田捷五郎	1894-1976
Eiji Shimizu	清水栄二	1895-?
Hachiro Masuda	増田八郎	1895-1945
Yohkichi Gondoh	権藤要吉	1895-1970
Sutemi Horiguchi	堀口捨己	1895–1984
Kenji Imai (architect)	今井兼次	1895–1963
Tadachika Kurata	蔵田周忠	1895–1966
Keiji Morita	森田慶一	1895–1983
Kakushi Matsunoi	松ノ井覚治	1895–1982
Gonkuro Kume	久米権九郎	1895–1965
Harumichi Kitao	北尾春道	1896-1973
Sheichiro Nakazawa	中澤誠一郎	1896-1986
Akira Uenami	上浪朗	1897-1975
Kamegi Tsuchiura	土浦亀城	1897–1996
Heigaku Tanabe	田辺平学	1898–1954
Shigeo Kamabara	蒲原重雄	1898–1932
Takehiko Okami	岡見健彦	1898–1972
Iwao Yamawaki	山脇巌	1898–1987
Katsura Ishii	石井桂	1898-1983
Matsuo Iwashita	岩下松雄	1898-1993
Takeo Kido	城戸武男	1899-1980
Hideto Kishida	岸田日出刀	1899–1966
Yoshiya Tanoue	田上義也	1899–1991

== Post World War II ==
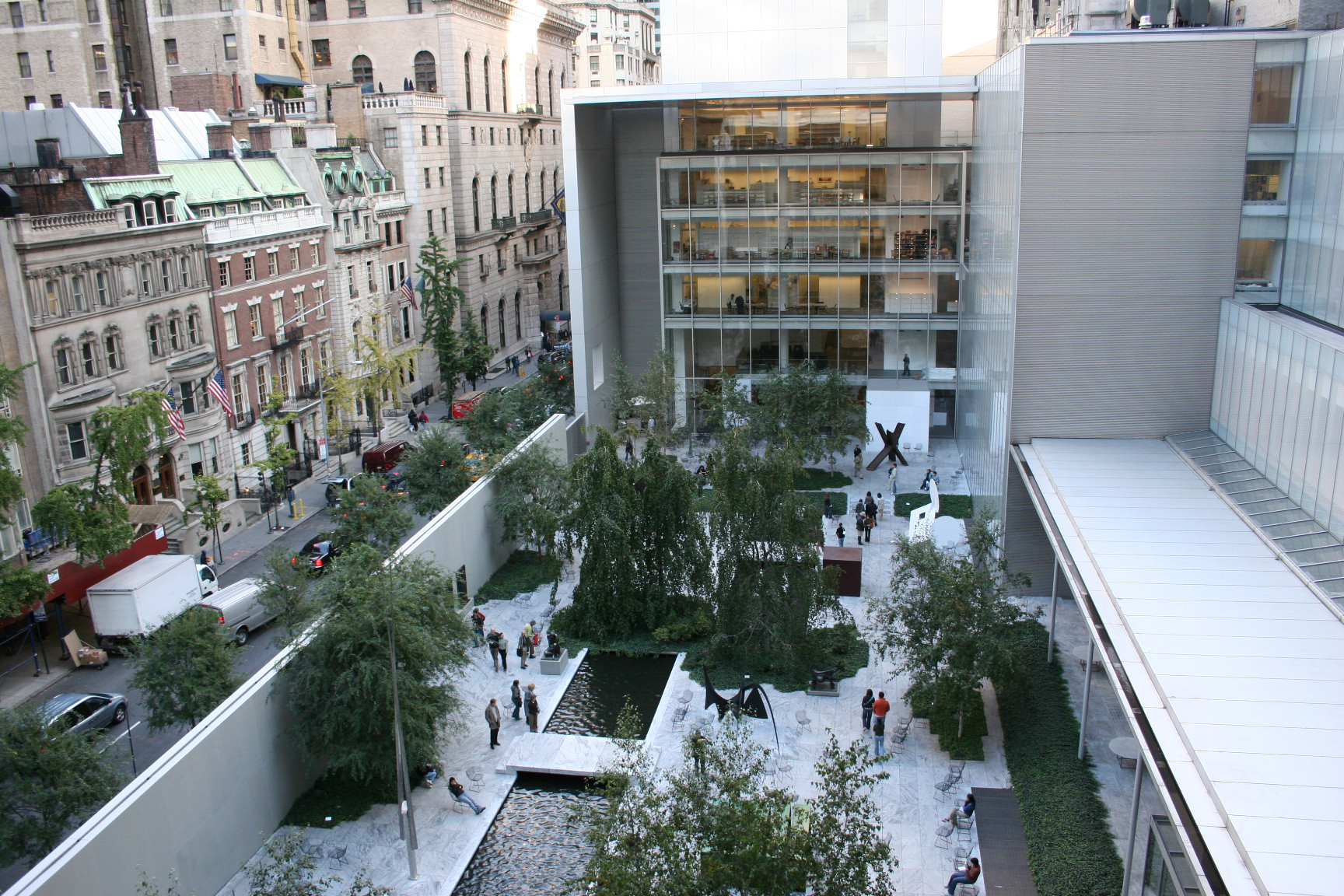
Museum of Modern Art, New York City Designed by Yoshio Taniguchi

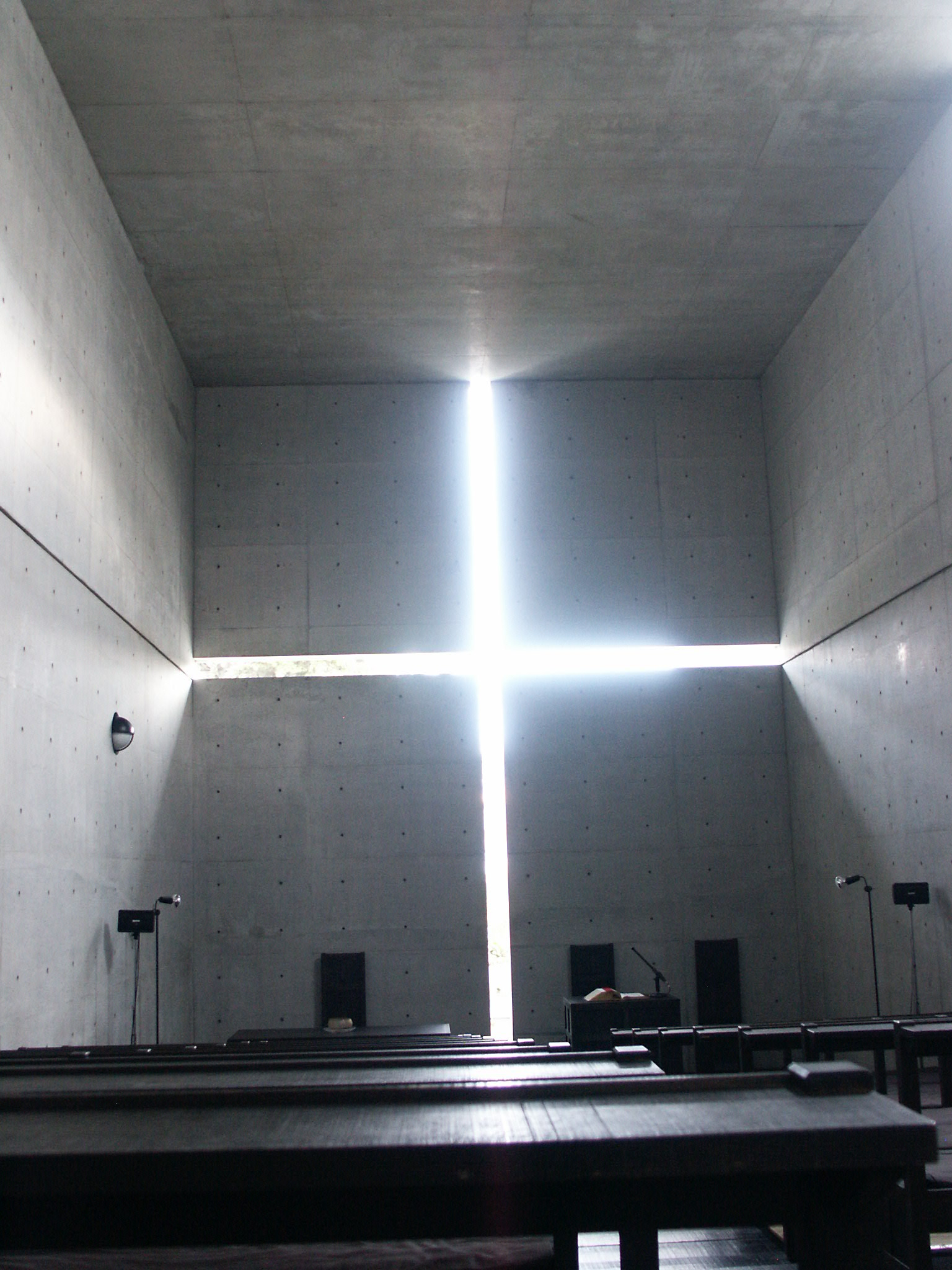
Church of the Light, Osaka Designed by Tadao Ando

Name	Nihongo	birth and death
Takeo Sato	佐藤武夫	1899–1972
Saburo Okura	大倉三郎	1900–1983
Kunihiko Yamakoshi	山越邦彦	1900–1980
Nobuko Tsuchiura	土浦信子	1900–1998
Yasuji Kanazawa	金澤庸治	1900-1982
Takeshi Tai	泰井武	1901-1997
Junzō Sakakura	坂倉準三	1901–1969
Bunzo Yamaguchi	山口文象	1902–1978
Renshichiro Kawakita	川喜田煉七郎	1902–1975
Kenzo Tohata	東畑謙三	1902–1998
Fugaku Yokoyama	横山不学	1902–1989
Kiyoshi Mutō	武藤清	1903–1989
Takezou Hayashi	林豪蔵	1903-1975
Sadakichi Mano	間野貞吉	1903-1979
Takashi Hirai	平山嵩	1903–1983
Ken Ichiura	市浦健	1904–1981
Yoshirō Taniguchi	谷口吉郎	1904–1979
Seiichi Shirai	白井晟一	1905–1983
Yoshihiko Hiramatsu	平松義彦	1905-1980
Kunio Maekawa	前川國男	1905–1986
Ichiro Ebihara	海老原一郎	1905–1990
Katsumi Yamamoto	山本勝巳	1905–1991
Masachika Murata	村田政眞	1906–1987
Sotoji Nakamura	中村外二	1906–1997
Yoshikatsu Tsuboi	坪井善勝	1907–1990
Junzō Yoshimura	吉村順三	1908–1997
Tsuneo Senga	千賀恒夫	1908-?
Haruhito Narida	成田春人	1908-1992
Masanobu Tada	多田正信	1909-2002
Shizutaro Urabe	浦辺鎮太郎	1909–1991
Moto Take	武基雄	1910–2005
Eika Takayama	高山英華	1910–1999
Uzo Nishiyama	西山夘三	1911–1994
Zen-ichi Imaizumi	今泉善一	1911-1985
Tsutomu Ikuta	生田勉	1912–1980
Tadashi Igarashi	五十嵐正	1912–1981
Hideo Kosaka	小坂秀雄	1912–2000
Chuji Kawashima	川島宙次	1912-1998
Shigeo Satoh	佐藤重夫	1912-2003
Shohji Ohhata	大旗正二	1913-?
Yoshinari Kohuchi	河内義就	1913-1987
Kazuhiko Honjo	本城和彦	1913-2002
Masatsune Matsumura	松村正恒	1913–1993
Hiroshi Ooe	大江宏	1913–1989
Kenzo Tange	丹下健三	1913–2005
Yoshifumi Uchida	内田祥文	1913–1946
Atsushi Yakushiji	薬師寺厚	1913–1998
Michizo Tachihara	立原道造	1914–1939
Tomoya Masuda	増田友也	1914–1981
Masa Murata	村田正	1914-1989
Tomoki Baba	馬場知己	1915-?
Toichi Nakamura	中村登一	1915-1969
Shiroh Asabuki	朝吹四郎	1915-1988
Hideji Miyagawa	宮川英二	1915-1989
Fumitaka Nishizawa	西澤文隆	1915–1986
Miho Hamaguchi	浜口ミホ	1915–1988
Yasumi Yoshitake	吉武泰水	1916–2003
Takamasa Yoshizaka	吉阪隆正	1917–1981
Katsuo Ando	安東勝男	1917–1988
Masao Matsumoto	松本正雄	1917-1986
Motochika Ikeuchi	池内基周	1918-1997
Shigenosuke Ishida	石田繁之介	1918-2013
Yoshinobu Ashihara	芦原義信	1918–2003
Taro Amano	天野太郎	1918–1990
Kiyoshi Seike	清家清	1918–2005
hiroYasu Toyoke	富家宏泰	1919-2007
Hideyuki Ohsawa	大沢秀行	1920-?
Shohichi Kawai	河合正一	1920-1986
Kiyoshi Ikebe	池辺陽	1920–1979
Masataka Endo	圓堂政嘉	1920–1994
Morin Kaku	郭茂林	1920–2012
Takashi Asada	浅田孝	1921–1990
Juichi Otake	大竹十一	1921–2005
Osamu Ishii	石井修	1922–2007
Kenji Hirose	広瀬鎌二	1922–2012
Tadashi Yoshihara	吉原正	1922–2014
Yoji Watanabe	渡邊洋治	1923–1983
Masato Otaka	大高正人	1923–2010
Minoru Ota	太田實	1923–2004
Kunio Kobayashi	小林邦夫	1923-?
Takekuni Ikeda	池田武邦	1924 –
Sachio Otani	大谷幸夫	1924–2013
Teiichi Takahashi	高橋てい一	1924–2016
Kimio Yokoyama	横山公男	1924–2010
Shuichi Tsubata	津端修一	1925–2015
Taneo Oki	沖種郎	1925–2005
Kazuo Shinohara	篠原一男	1925–2006
Yoshichika Uchida	内田祥哉	1925 –
Makoto Masuzawa	増沢洵	1925–1990
Kenji Mitsuyoshi	光吉健次	1925–2000
Tadashi Yamamoto (athlete)	山本忠司	1925–1998
Katsumi Sugiura	杉浦克美	1925-
Koichi Yamada	山田幸一	1925-1992
Tadashi Yamamoto	山本忠司	1925-1998
Hiroshi Ohsawa	大沢弘	1926-?
Ken-ichi Shirahama	白濱謙一	1926-2010
Azusa Kito	鬼頭梓	1926–2008
Toshijiko Kimura	木村俊彦	1926–2009
Ren Suzuki	進来廉	1926–2009
Masao Hayakawa	早川正夫	1926 –
Seifun Suzuki	鈴木成文	1927–2010
Tadanaga Miyamoto	宮本忠長	1927–2016
Shoji Kawade	川手昭二	1927 –
Kenji Takizawa	滝沢健児	1927–2013
Yozo Shibata	柴田陽三	1927–2003
Nobuo Hozumi	穂積信夫	1927-
Akira Tarashima	田良島昭	1928-
Keiichiro Mogi	茂木計一郎	1928-2008
Akio Okumura	奥村昭雄	1928-2012
Kiyomatsu Yamanashi	山梨清松	1928-2015
Shinnichi Okada	岡田新一	1928–2014
Takashi Imasato	今里隆	1928 –
Yoshiro Ikehara	池原義郎	1928–2017
Kiyonori Kikutake	菊竹清訓	1928–2011
Masako Hayashi	林雅子	1928–2001
Koji Kamiya	神谷宏治	1928–2014
Fumihiko Maki	槇文彦	1928–2024
Hayashi Shōji	林昌二	1928–2011
Seizo Sakata	阪田誠造	1928–2016
Nobuko Nakahara	中原暢子	1929–2008
Hironobu Furihata	降幡廣信	1929 –
Shigehiko Sugi	杉重彦	1929-
Takae Shohji	荘司孝衛	1929-
Masamitsu Nagashima	長島正充	1929-2010
Yoshitaka Akui	阿久井善孝	1930-
Shohichi Kondoh	近藤正一	1930-
Hayahiko Takase	高瀬隼彦	1930 -
Ninhiro Too	戸尾任宏	1930-2011
Atsushi Ueda	上田篤	1930 –
Keiji Yoshida	吉田桂二	1930–2015
Gyoji Banshoya	番匠谷尭二	1930–1999
Toru Funakoshi	船越徹	1931–2017
Arata Isozaki	磯崎新	1931 –
Kan Izue	出江寛	1931 –
Akira Muto	武藤章	1931–1985
Kiyoshi Kawasaki	川崎清	1932–2018
Kohichiroh Okamura	岡村幸一郎	1932-
Miki Yoshioka	吉岡三樹	1932-
Shōzō Uchii	内井昭蔵	1933–2002
Hiromi Fujii	藤井博巳	1933 –
Takamitsu Azuma	東孝光	1933–2015
Koichi Tonuma	戸沼幸市	1933 –
Shin Takasu	高須賀晋	1933-2010
Jiroh Inazuka	稲塚二郎	1933-2012
Masuji Korenaga	是永益司	1934-
Shin Sawayanagi	沢柳伸	1934-
Yoshio Fujigawa	藤川壽男	1934-
Von Jour Caux	梵寿綱	1934 –
Masahiro Chatani	茶谷正洋	1934–2008
Minoru Takeyama	竹山実	1934 –
Kisho Kurokawa	黒川紀章	1934–2007
Takanobu Ota	太田隆信	1934 –
Tsunekata Naito	内藤恒方	1934 –
Takahiko Yanagizawa	柳澤孝彦	1935–2017
Makoto Suzuki	鈴木恂	1935 –
Yasutaka Yamazaki	山崎泰孝	1935–2016
Eisuke Mizutani	水谷頴介	1935–1993
Takamasa Ujiie	氏家隆正	1935-
Kunio Hiraga	平賀国夫	1935-
Kozo Yamamoto	山本浩三	1936-
NobuYoshi Hamada	浜田信義	1936-
Kimio Takano	高野公男	1936-2015
Narifumi Murao	村尾成文	1936-2015
Mayumi Miyawaki	宮脇檀	1936–1998
Akira Ozawa	小沢明	1936 –
Tsutomu Abe	阿部勤	1936 –
Yasushi Hayashi	林泰義	1936 –
Hiroshi Hara (architect)	原広司	1936 –
Koichi Sone	曽根幸一	1936 –
Hisami Yamamoto	山本長水	1936 –
Kazumasa Yamashita	山下和正	1937 –
Hisao Komura	香山壽夫	1937 –
Masayuki Kurokawa	黒川雅之	1937 –
Yasushi Kijima	木島安史	1937–1992
Jun Itami	伊丹潤	1937–2011
Takefumi Aida	相田武文	1937 –
Yoshio Taniguchi	谷口吉生	1937 –
Masaya Fujimoto	藤本昌也	1937 –
Kensuke Yoshida	吉田研介	1938 –
Yasuichi Otake	大竹康市	1938–1983
Toyokazu Watanabe	渡辺豊和	1938 –
Reiko Tomita	富田玲子	1938 –
Shigeru Ban	播繁	1938 –
Akira Watanabe	渡辺明	1938 –
Tamon Okubo	奥保多聞	1938-
Yoshinobu Yoshida	吉田好伸	1938-1976
Hideya Kageyama	陰山日出也	1939-
Masaru Okamoto	岡本賢	1939-
Osamu Nakasuji	中筋修	1939-
Yasumichi Fukusawa	福澤宗道	1939-2012
Shinnsuke Takamiya	高宮眞介	1939 –
Kin-ya Maruyama	丸山欣也	1939 –
Hiroyasu Higuchi	樋口裕康	1939 –
Kunio Watanabe	渡辺邦夫	1939 –
Jiro Murofushi	室伏次郎	1940 –
Yoshihiro Masuko	益子義弘	1940 –
Yuji Yoga	納賀雄嗣	1940 –
Yasuyuki Takaguchi	高口恭行	1940 –
Minako Murakami	村上美奈子	1940-
Yasuhiro Hamano	浜野安宏	1941-
Taketsugu Fukusawa	福澤健次	1941-
Yoshihiro Hiramatsu	平松良洋	1941-
Masatami Nagada	永田昌民	1941-2013
Shoei Yo	葉祥栄	1941 –
Toyo Ito	伊東豊雄	1941 –
Kijo Rokkaku	六角鬼丈	1941–2019
Takashi Kurosawa	黒沢隆	1941–2014
Tadao Ando	安藤忠雄	1941 –
Yasumitsu Matsunaga	松永安光	1941 –
Mozuna Kiko	毛綱毅曠	1941–2001
Kunihiko Hayakawa	早川邦彦	1941 –
Itsuko Hasegawa	長谷川逸子	1941 –
Mitsuru Senda	仙田満	1941 –
Hirotaka Kidosaki	城戸崎博孝	1942 –
Shoichi Hariu	針生承一	1942 –
Sadao Sugiura	杉浦定雄	1942-
Yoshiaki Ozawa	小澤良明	1943-
Tatsuchi Ohuchi	大内達史	1943-
Mamoru Kokubu	國分守	1943-
Yuzuru Tominaga	富永譲	1943 –
Kazunari Sakamoto	坂本一成	1943 –
Moritoshi Kakinuma	柿沼守利	1943 –
Hiroki Sirazawa	白澤宏規	1943 –
Masato Araya	新谷眞人	1943 –
Koichi Makishi	真喜志好一	1943 –
Kazuhiro Ishii	石井和紘	1944–2015
Osamu Ishiyama	石山修武	1944 –
K0ji Yagi	八木幸二	1944 –
Ryoji Suzuki	鈴木了二	1944 –
Katsuhiko Ohno	大野勝彦	1944–2012
Yohkichi Ohkubo	大久保洋吉	1944-
Yukio Komachi	小町幸生	1945-
Naoshi Nokuo	野久尾尚志	1945-
Yasuo Murata	村田靖夫	1945–2007
Eizo Shiina	椎名英三	1945 –
Riken Yamamoto	山本理顕	1945 –
Terunobu Fujimori	藤森照信	1946 –
Takenosuke Sakakura	坂倉竹之助	1946 –
Masayuki Irie	入江正之	1946 –
Tsutomu Shigemura	重村力	1946 –
Tatsuhiko Kuramoto	倉本龍彦	1946 –
Mutsuro Sasaki	佐々木睦朗	1946 –
Kazuhiko Nanba	難波和彦	1947 –
Norihide Imagawa	今川憲英	1947 –
Edoward Suzuki	鈴木エドワード	1947 –
Yutaka Saito	齋藤裕	1947 –
Akira Kuryu	栗生明	1947 –
Izumi Kosuke	泉幸甫	1947 –
Noriaki Okabe	岡部憲明	1947 –
Fumio Toki	陶器二三雄	1947 –
Tokutoshi Torii	鳥居徳敏	1947 –
Koshiro Kitayama	北山孝二郎	1947 –
Keisuke Yamamoto	山本圭介	1947 –
Hirohisa Furugawa	古川裕久	1947-
Noriko Kawamura	川村則子	1947-
Moboru Katoh	加藤昇	1948-
Kohichi Iwasaki	岩﨑孝一	1948-
Tsutomu Nishikura	西倉努	1948-
Kiyoshi Ishibashi	石橋清志	1948-
Eriya Taniguchi	谷口江里也	1948-
Sachio Shimada	嶋田幸男	1948-
Takahiro Saiki	齊木崇人	1948-
Ken Yokogawa	横河健	1948 –
Shin Takamatsu	高松伸	1948 –
Tetsuo Furuichi	古市徹雄	1948 –
Shigeru Aoki	青木茂	1948 –
Chiaki Arai	新居千秋	1948 –
Junichi Kawamura	川村純一	1948 –
Yoshiji Takehara	竹原義二	1948 –
Yoshifumi Nakamura	中村好文	1948 –
Hajime Yatsuka	八束はじめ	1948 –
Hideto Horiike	堀池秀人	1949–2015
Hidetoshi Ohno	大野秀敏	1949 –
Toru Murakami	村上徹	1949 –
Hiroyuki Wakabayashi	若林広幸	1949 –
Shohhei Satoh	佐藤正平	1949-
Yasutaka Miyoshi	三好庸隆	1949-
Masaaki Yamagata	山形政昭	1949-
Toshiaki Seo	瀬尾敏明	1949-
Kazutoshi Takematsu	竹松和利	1949-
Shunsaku Suzuki	鈴木俊作	1949-
Kiichi Suzuki	鈴木喜一	1949-2013
Hiroyuki Kawagoe	川越裕章	1950-
Yoshihiko Iida	飯田善彦	1950 –
Waro Kishi	岸和郎	1950 –
Makoto Mari Watanabe	渡辺真理	1950 –
Tsoshiaki Ishida	石田敏明	1950 –
Hiroshi Naito	内藤廣	1950 –
Koh Kitayama	北山恒	1950 –
Atsushi Kitagawara	北川原温	1951 –
Akira Sakamoto	坂本昭	1951 –
Akio Yachida	谷内田章夫	1951 –
Michiro Kinoshita	木下道郎	1951 –
Kunihiro George	国広ジョージ	1951-
Toshiko Mori	トシコ・モリ	1951 –
Hiroshi Tsumorida	積田洋	1951-
Akio Kuroyanagi	畔柳昭雄	1952-
Hiroshi Miyazaki	宮崎浩	1952 –
Hiroaki Kimura	木村博昭	1952 –
Michimasa Kawaguchi	川口通正	1952 –
Makoto Sei Watanabe	渡辺誠	1952 –
Takashi Yamaguchi	山口隆 (建築家)	1953 –
Yoshiharu Kanehako	金箱温春	1953 –
Makoto Nozawa	野沢誠	1953 –
Kenji Sugimura	杉村憲司	1953 –
Akio Kamiya	神家昭雄	1953 –
Masaharu Takasaki	高崎正治	1953 –
Hidetsugu Horikoshi	堀越英嗣	1953 –
Jun Watanabe	渡辺純	1953 –
Kengo Kuma	隈研吾	1954 –
Toshihiko Yokouchi	横内敏人	1954 –
Sei Takeyama	竹山聖	1954 –
YoshiNori Tatokoro	田所嘉徳	1954-
Kenji Yanagawa	柳川賢次	1954-
Eisaku Ushida	牛田英作	1954 –
Nobuaki Furuya	古谷誠章	1955 –
Shinnichi Ogawa	小川晋一	1955 –
Jun Mitsui	光井純	1955 –
Takako Yokomura	横村隆子	1955-
Tadao Kamei	亀井忠夫	1955-
Koji Horikushi	堀口浩司	1955-
Hisaaki Yaita	矢板久明	1955-
Wataru Seya	瀬谷渉	1956-
Masahide Ikuyama	生山雅英	1956-2016
Jun Aoki	青木淳	1956 –
Kazuyo Sejima	妹島和世	1956 –
Norihiko Dan	團紀彦	1956 –
Hiroyuki Arima	有馬裕之	1956 –
Yoko Kinoshita	木下庸子	1956 –
Katsufumi Kubota	窪田勝文	1957 –
Shigeru Ban	坂茂	1957 –
Osamu Ikeda	池田修	1957-
Yoshiyuki Furuda	古田秀行	1957-
Nobuhiko Ando	安藤暢彦	1958-
Naoko Yaita	矢板直子	1958-
Satoko Shinohara	篠原聡子	1958 –
Koichi Yasuda	安田幸一	1958 –
Kazuhiro Kojima	小嶋一浩	1958–2016
Akiko Takahashi	高橋晶子	1958 –
Noritaka Tange	丹下憲孝	1958 –
Satoshi Irei	伊礼智	1959 –
Yudai Nakamura	中村勇大	1959 –
Akira Yoneda	米田明	1959 –
Shuhei Endo	遠藤秀平	1960 –
Yasuhiro Yamashita	山下保博	1960 –
Ikuyo Seki	関郁代	1960-
Kazumi Kudoh	工藤和美	1960-
kichiki Mizuno	水野吉樹	1960-
Hiroshi Horiba	堀場弘	1960-
Hitoshi Wakamatsu	若松均	1960 –
Tomohiro Yamanashi	山梨知彦	1960 –
Manabu Chiba	千葉学	1960 –
Kazumi Kudo	工藤和美	1960 –
Hiroshi Horiba	堀場弘	1960 –
Yasuyuki Ito	伊藤恭行	1961 –
Katsuhiro Miyamoto	宮本佳明	1961 –
Eirai Iwata	岩田英来	1961-
Sumito Takagai	高階澄人	1961-
Kazuo Ohgaki	大垣賀津雄	1961-
Tatsuhiko Nakagawa	中川達彦	1961-
Takehiko Hiki	比嘉武彦	1961-
YoshiAki Tetsuka	手塚義明	1962-
Hitoshi Abe	阿部仁史	1962 –
Hiroaki Otani	大谷弘明	1962 –
Mitsuhiko Sato	佐藤光彦	1962 –
Masafumi Sokabe	曽我部昌史	1962 –
Masayoshi Takeuchi	竹内昌義	1962 –
Makoto Yokomizo	ヨコミゾマコト	1962 –
Masaki Endo	遠藤政樹	1963 –
Masao Izumi	小泉雅生	1963 –
Hiroshi Takahashi (architect)	高橋寛	1953 –
Hirohisa Kosugi	小杉浩久	1963-
Osamu Takahashi	高橋修	1963-
Katsu Umebayashi	梅林克	1963-
Yoshikazu Iijima	飯嶋義一	1963-
Hirono Koike	小池ひろの	1964-
Yasuko Kawaharada	川原田康子	1964-
Takaharu Tezuka	手塚貴晴	1964 –
Taira Nishizawa	西沢大良	1964 –
Yoshiharu Tukamoto	塚本由晴	1965 –
Takao Shiotsuka	塩塚隆生	1965 –
Toshiaki Katoh	加藤敏明	1965-
Shigeru Kawashima	川島茂	1965-
Kohichiro Ohtani	大谷浩一郎	1965-
Toshihiko Tanahashi	棚橋国彦	1965-
Nobukazu Nakama	中間伸和	1965-
Hiroaki Inouye	井上博明	1966-
Sotaro Yamamoto	山本想太郎	1966-
Chika Kijima	木島千嘉	1966-
Miho Suzuka	鈴鹿美穂	1966-
Ryue Nishizawa	西沢立衛	1966 –
Yasushi Horibe	堀部安嗣	1967 –
Koshi Takeda	武田光史	1967-
Daisaku Hayashida	林田大作	1967-
Makoto Endo	遠藤誠	1968-
Kensuke Kawate	川手謙介	1968-
Hiroshi Sanbuichi	三分一博志	1968 –
Katsuya Fukushima	福島加津也	1968 –
Kenichiro Niizeki	新関謙一郎	1969 –
Kumiko Inui	乾久美子	1969 –
Takahide Sei	清孝英	1969-
Yui Tezuka	手塚由比	1969 –
Momoyo Kaijima	貝島桃代	1969 –
Jun Igarashi	五十嵐淳	1970 –
Yoshihiko Oshima	大島芳彦	1970 –
Jun Sato	佐藤淳	1970 –
Hirofumi Itoh	伊藤博之	1970-
Eisuke Yamazaki	山﨑栄介	1970-
Toshihiro Mizutani	水谷俊博	1970-
Masato Ashiya	芦屋真人	1970-2014
Tomomi Hayashi	はやしともみ	1971 –
Sou Fujimoto	藤本壮介	1971 –
Shou Nagasaka	長坂常	1971 –
Akihisa Hirata	平田晃久	1971 –
Hajime Narukawa	鳴川肇	1971 –
Tetsuo Kobori	小堀哲夫	1971 –
Tadashi Kuwahara	久和原忠	1971-
Yasuko Ohtsuka	大塚泰子	1971-
Kentaro Takekuchi	竹口健太郎	1971 –
Yasutaka Yoshimura	吉村靖孝	1972 –
Naotami Yasuda	安田直民	1972-
Ken^ichiroh Iwakiri	岩切剣一郎	1972-
Keisuke Toyoda	豊田啓介	1972-
Hiroshi Kikuchi	菊地宏	1972 –
Yuji Nakamura	中村竜治	1972 –
Hideyuki Nakayama	中山英之	1972 –
Kazuyasu Kouchi	河内一泰	1973 –
Keiji Ashizawa	芦沢啓治	1973 –
Isao Miyazaki	宮﨑勲	1973-
Satoshi Matsuoka	松岡聡	1973-
shuji Ohta	太田秀俊	1973-
kazuki Nakamura	中村和基	1973-
Tetsuya Fukuda	福田哲也	1973-
Koichi Suzuno	鈴野浩一	1973 –
Masahiro Harada	原田真宏	1973 –
Satoshi Matsuoka	松岡聡	1973 –
Hiroshi Nakamura	中村拓志	1974 –
Jun'ya Ishigami	石上純也	1974 –
Shinya Kamurro	禿真哉	1974 –
Makoto Takei	武井誠	1974 –
Makoto Tanijiri	谷尻誠	1974 –
Ken-ichi Dehara	出原賢一	1974-
Keisuke Maeda	前田圭介	1974-
Saoko Nakagawa	中川佐保子	1974-
Yuko Nagayama	永山祐子	1975 –
Chie Nabejima	鍋島千恵	1975 –
Kenichi Teramoto	寺本健一	1975-
Naoko Matsumoto	松本尚子	1975-
Hirokazu Suemitsu	末光弘和	1976 –
Tsukasa Nishida	西田司	1976 –
Ryuji Fujimura	藤村龍至	1976 –
Go Hasegawa	長谷川豪	1977 –
Sato Oki	佐藤オオキ	1977 –
Ryu Kanno	菅野龍	1977-
Masaki Ohnishi	大西正紀	1977-
Yuki Tamura	田村裕希	1977-
Takeshi Tsuchiya	土屋毅	1977-
Chisato Iiyama	飯山千里	1977-
Ippei Takahashi	髙橋一平	1977-
Kyohei Sakaguchi	坂口恭平	1978 –
Tadashi Kanai	金井直	1978-
Kichihiro Tada	夛田吉宏	1978-
Tsuyoshi Tane	田根剛	1979 –
Nobuhito Nishisaki	西崎暢仁	1979-
Jun-ya Inagaki	稲垣淳哉	1980-
Satoshi Sano	佐野哲史	1980-
Takaomi Ohhira	大平貴臣	1980-
Noriko Nakabayashi	中林仁子	1980-
Naoya Kitamura	北村直也	1980-
Eisuke Hori	堀英祐	1980-
Masayuki Ochiai	落合正行	1980-
Tetsuya Ishizaki	石崎哲也	1980 -
Mitsuteru Esumi	江泉光哲	1981-
Yusuke Fujida	藤田雄介	1981-
Yoshiteru Kishida	岸田佳晃	1982-
Daisuke Kaneko	金子太亮	1982-
Hiroyasu Miyoshi	三好礼益	1982-
Shuhei Kamiya	神谷修平	1982-
Yuki Hyakuda	百田有希	1982-
Keisuke Fukui	福井啓介	1982-
Soma Yokoi	横井創馬	1983-
Shimon Ono	小野志門	1983-
Kenta Kitagawa	北川健太	1983-
Takuya Kitsukawa	桔川卓也	1984-
Takeshi Hashimoto	橋本健史	1984-
Keisuke Morigawa	森川啓介	1984-
Kazunari Kokugan	國眼一成	1984-
Toru Yada	彌田徹	1985-
Takuma Tsuji	辻琢磨	1986-
Takumi Tsujikawa	辻川巧	1992-
Itsuki Tsujikawa	辻川樹	1995-

== See also ==
- Architecture of Japan
- List of architects, List of landscape architects
- List of Japanese people
