= Nobuko =

- Gender: Female

Origin
- Origin: Japanese
- Meaning: It can have many different meanings depending on the kanji used.
- Region of origin: Japan

Other names
- Related names: Nobu; Nobue

Nobuko (のぶこ, ノブコ) is a feminine Japanese given name. Although the name is always romanized the same way, the kanji characters can be different.

== Written forms ==
Forms in kanji can include:

- 信子, "trust, child"
- 伸子, "to lengthen, child"
- 延子, "to prolong, child"
- 暢子, "extend/stretch, relax/child"
- 宜子, "good, child"

== People ==
- Nobuko Albery, a Japanese author, theatrical producer and the widow of English theatrical impresario, Sir Donald Albery
- Princess Nobuko (Japanese romanization: Fumi-no-miya Nobuko Naishinnō, 富美宮允子内親王), the 8th daughter of Emperor Meiji
- Nobuko Asō (麻生信子), later Princess Tomohito of Mikasa (寛仁親王妃信子)
- Nobuko Fujimura (藤村 信子; born 1965), Japanese female former long-distance runner
- Nobuko Fukuda (福田 修子; born 1980), Japanese cross-country skier
- Nobuko Fushimi (伏見 信子; born 1915), Japanese actress and singer
- Nobuko Imai (今井 信子; born 1943), Japanese classical violist and chamber musician
- Nobuko Iwaki ((井脇 ノブ子; born 1946), Japanese politician
- Nobuko JoAnne Miyamoto (born 1939), Japanese-American folk singer, songwriter, author, and activist
- Nobuko Kan (菅 伸子; born 1945), Japanese writer
- Nobuko Kawano (河野 信子; born 1950), Japanese athlete
- Nobuko Kondo (近藤 修子; born 1956), Japanese football player
- Nobuko Matsudaira (松平 信子; 1886–1969), Japanese socialite
- Nobuko Miyamoto (宮本 信子; born 1945), Japanese actress
- Nobuko Motomura (本村 伸子; born 1972), Japanese member of the Japanese Communist Party
- Nobuko Nagaoka (長岡 延子; 1928–1945), Japanese pianist
- Nobuko Nakahara (中原 暢子; 1929–2008), Japanese architect
- Nobuko Nakano (中野 信子; born 1975), Japanese neuroscientist
- Nobuko Okashita (岡下 信子; born 1939), Japanese politician
- Nobuko Ota (太田 信子; born 1969), Japanese rower
- Nobuko Otowa (乙羽 信子; 1924–1994), Japanese actress
- Nobuko Takagi (高樹 のぶ子; born 1946), Japanese author
- Nobuko Takahashi (高橋 展子; 1916–1990), Japanese ambassador to Denmark from 1980 until 1983
- Nobuko Tsuchiura (土浦 信子; 1900–1998), Japanese first woman architect
- Nobuko Tsuchiya (土屋 信子; born 1972), Japanese artist based in London
- Nobuko Yamada (山田 乃玞子; born 1971), Japanese speed skater
- Nobuko Yoshida (吉田 展子), Japanese computer scientist
- Nobuko Yoshiya (吉屋 信子; 1896–1973), Japanese novelist who was active in the Taishō and Shōwa periods of Japan

== Fictional characters ==
- Nobuko Ishihara (石原信子), a character in the manga Love Com
- Nobuko Kotani (小谷 信子), the titular character of the Japanese television drama Nobuta wo Produce
- Nobuko Komiyama (小宮山信子), the titular character of the film Nobuko (1940 film), one of many adaptations of a novel by Bunroku Shishi
