= Waseda =

Waseda (早稲田) may refer to:

- Waseda, Tokyo
- Waseda University
- Waseda-SAT2
- 9350 Waseda
- Waseda El Dorado

== People with the surname ==
- Noboru Waseda (早稲田 昇; born 1951), Japanese swimmer
- Yuki Waseda (早稲田 夕季; born 1958), Japanese politician

== See also ==
- Waseda Station (disambiguation)
