= NOA building =

15-storey building in Minato, Japan

Coordinates: 35.659333°N 139.742583°E

Noa building in Tokyo.

The NOA building is a landmark 15-storey building located in Tokyo’s Azabu district in Minato, Tokyo, Japan. Designed by Japanese architect Seiichi Shirai, it was built in 1974. Facing Sakurada Street and Gaien-Higashi Street, the building is notable for its extensive use of brick stones and large entrance. It consists of a red-brick base of about 8 meters height and a copper sulfate shaped as an elliptical cylinder upper part with almost no windows (with only a full-length one on the 8th or 9th floor), and hosts the Embassy of Fiji. It has a height of 61.75 meters, with 15 floors above and 2 below ground.

The design of the building was entrusted to Seiichi Shirai by founder Yoshitsuru Nagao, whose real estate corporation was founded in 1969. The building was completed in 1974.

== See also ==
- Nakagin Capsule Tower
- Shizuoka Press and Broadcasting Center
