= Masako Hayashi =

Japanese architect

Masako Hayashi (林 雅子, Hayashi Masako; 1928-2001) was a Japanese architect. She was the first woman to win the Architectural Institute of Japan Award.

== Career ==
Hayashi primarily designed residential housing for limited space environments, using innovative building materials, space utilization and clean design. In 1958, Hayashi co-founded the Hayashi, Yamada, Nakahara Architectural Design Coterie with Hatsue Yamada and Nobuko Nakahara.

She was the first woman to win the Architectural Institute of Japan Award.

== Personal life ==
She was married to architect Shoji Hayashi.

== Notable awards ==
- American Institute of Architects Honorary Fellowship
- Architectural Institute of Japan Award

== Notable works ==
- Umi no gyararī (Gallery of the Sea), Tosashimizu, Kōchi, Japan
