= Nobuko Takahashi =

Japanese diplomat (1916–1990)

- 高橋展子
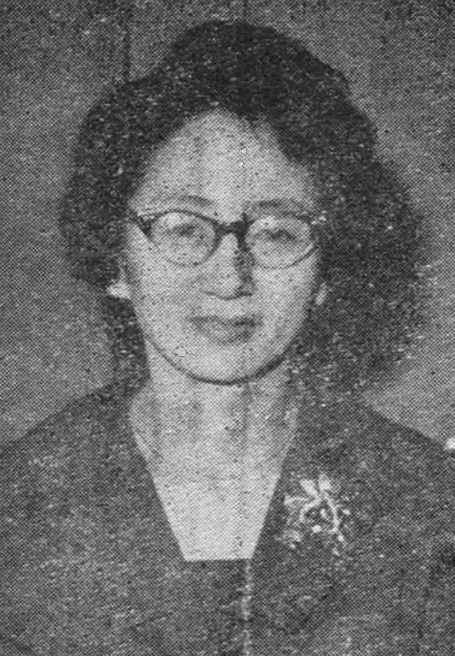

Ambassador of Japan to Denmark

Personal details
- Born: April 16, 1916
- Died: September 15, 1990 (aged 74)

Japanese name
- Hiragana: たかはし のぶこ

Nobuko Takahashi (高橋展子, Takahashi Nobuko; April 19, 1916 – September 15, 1990) was the Japanese ambassador to Denmark from 1980 until 1983. Takahashi was the first female ambassador to Denmark from Japan.

She “signed the Convention on the Elimination of All Forms of Discrimination against Women, which was the key international convention of the United Nations Decade for Women” in 1980.
