= Seiichi Shirai =

Japanese architect

Seiichi Shirai or Seiichi Sirai
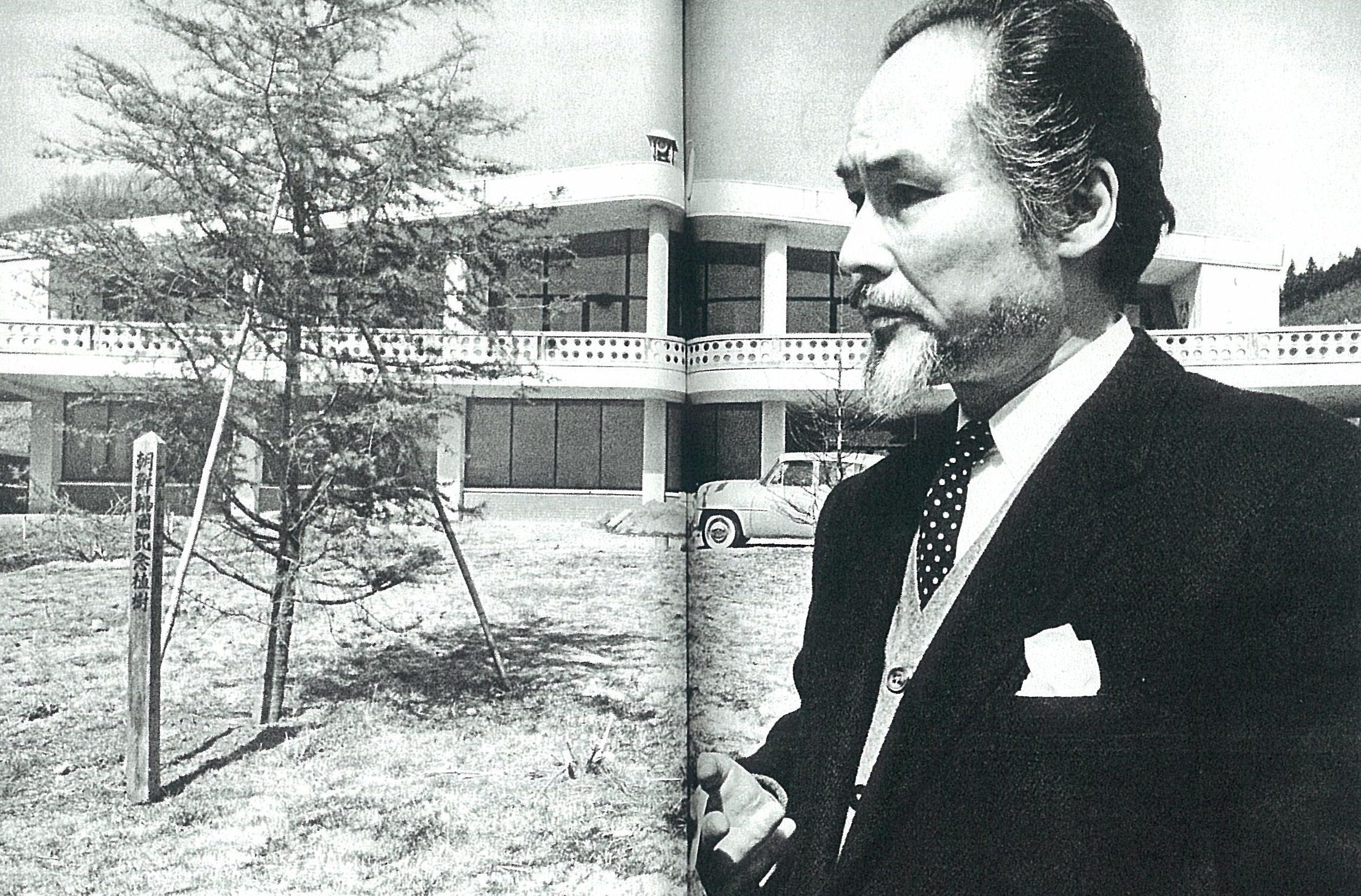
- Seiichi Shirai. The building at his back is Matsuida town hall which he designed in 1959.
- Born: 1905
- Died: 1983 (aged 77–78)
- Occupation: Architect

Seiichi Shirai (ja:白井晟一) was a Japanese architect. His eccentric, mysterious and extremely refined architectural language made him highly esteemed in his native country of Japan.

== Style ==
Seiichi Shirai's style is unique. His unexpected way of using exquisite and rare (in Japan) materials (marmor, brick, nature stone) make his buildings seem to be independent of their surrounding and at odds with the common Japanese architecture of this time. Nevertheless, there are European influences, evidence of his studies in Europe, as well as Japanese influences present in his work: Particular use of European classicist furniture and facades are reminiscent of Carlo Scarpa.

== Works ==
NOA building (1964), Shinwa Bank Computer Tower, Nagasaki (1974), Shōtō Museum of Art, Tokyo 1981, Shizuoka City Serizawa Keisuke Art Museum (1981).
