= Jun Itami =

JUN ITAMI
- Architect
- 1937–2011
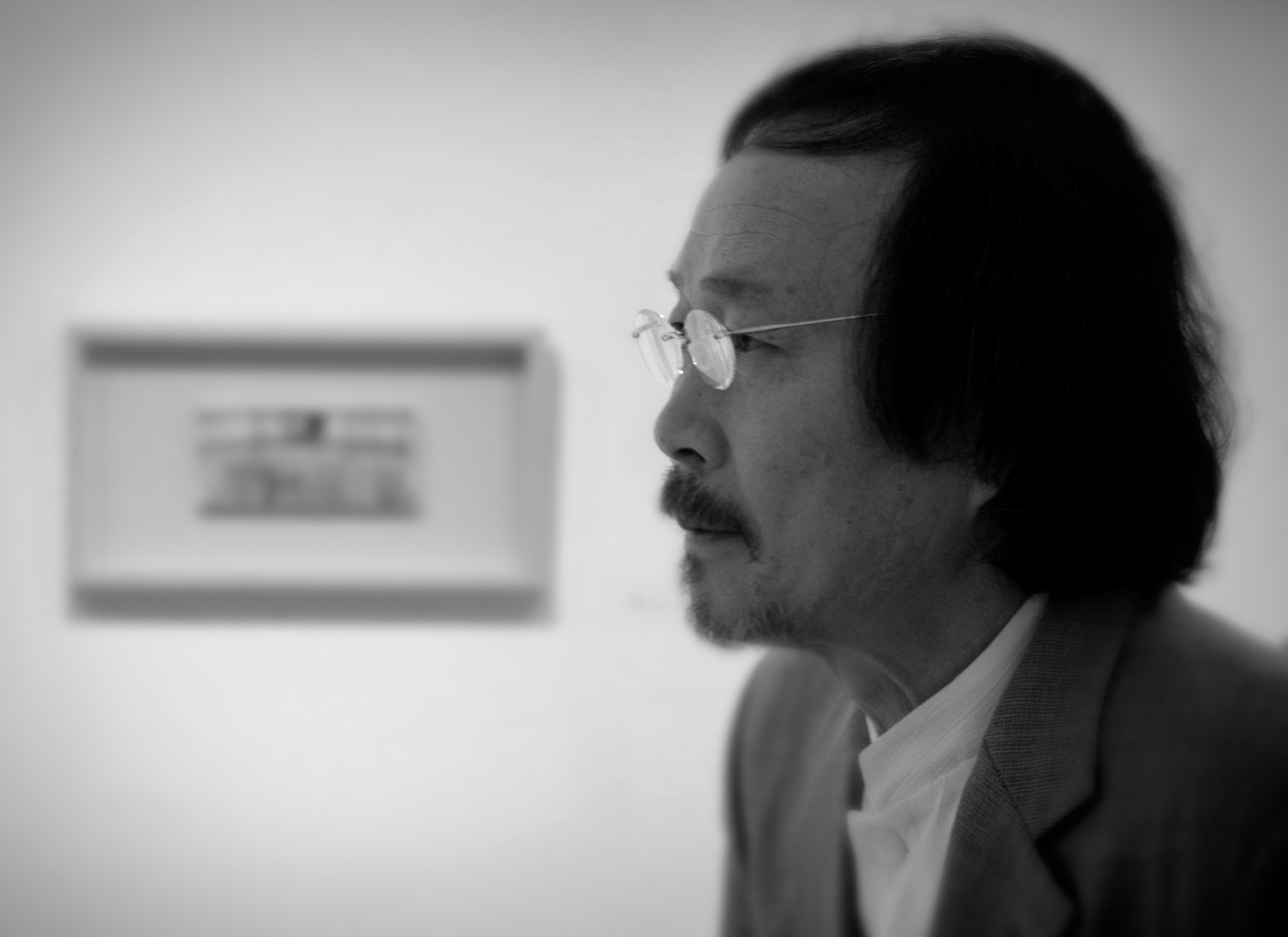
- 伊丹 潤

Yoo Dong-ryong (Korean: 유동룡 伊丹 潤; 1937–2011), known professionally as Jun Itami, is a Korean architect from Japan. He was born in Tokyo 1937 to Korean parents and gained his degree in architecture at Musashi Institute of Technology (now called Tokyo City University) in 1968. Itami Jun spent his childhood in Shizuoka, Japan and entered the world of architecture by traveling and encountering many other artists. With profound insight into objects, he learned and expressed architecture with the physical senses of touch and drawing as his medium. In the homogeneous industrial society, Itami Jun sought to practice contemporary architecture with an anti-modern bent, emphasizing purity of architecture and material, and pursuing heavy primitive architecture with a sense of rawness in the material. Itami Jun’s Jeju projects in his late years demonstrate the mature beauty of his architecture.

== Timeline ==
- 1937 Born in Tokyo, Japan
- 1964 Graduated from University of Musashi Institute of Technology, B.Arch
- 1968 Established Itami Jun Architect a Research Institute
- 2002 Established Itami Jun Architect a Research Institute (Seoul Branch)
- 2007-2008 A member of The Japan Folk Craft Museum steering committee
- 2009-2011 Master Architect of Jeju Global Education City

== Awards ==
- 2010 The 23rd Murano Togo Award
- 2008 Excellence Award - Korea Architecture Award
- 2006 Asian Award for Culture and Landscape of Settlements (International Design Competition on Asia City Housing & Environment)
- 2006 Kim Swoo-geun Prize
- 2005 Légion d'honneur, Grade de chevalier dans l'ordre des Arts et des Lettres en France
- 2004 Excellent prize – Gyeongju World Culture EXPO Park International Competition
- 2001 Award of The Korea Institute of Architect
- 1992 1st prize – National Oceanic Museum International Competition
- 1992 Good Interior Design – G.I.D competition
- 1981 Japan Sign Association Prize
- 1979 Japan Shop Designer Association Prize

== KARYA ==
- 2014 Itami Jun: Architecture of the Wind, National Museum of Modern and Contemporary Art, Gwacheon, South Korea
- 2012 Vestigial Impressions, TOTO GALLERY MA, Tokyo, Japan
- 2010 Interventions in the Guggenheim Museum Rotunda, Guggenheim Museum, New York, U.S.A
- 2007 Space Gallery - Solo Exhibition, Seoul, Korea
- 2006 Architectural Biennale, Beijing, China
- 2004 Aedes East Architecture Forum, Berlin, Germany
- 2003 Museum national des Arts asiatiques - Guimet, Paris, France
- 2000 Gallery M.A.P, Fukuoka, Japan
- 1997 Exhibition Space of Tokyo International Forum, Tokyo, Japan
- 1995 Fukuoka Art Museum, Fukuoka, Japan
- 1986 Invited Work, The Museum of Modern Art, Saitama, Japan
- 1984 Fine Arts Museum, Fukui, Japan
- 1983 Space Museum, Seoul, Korea

== Publications ==
- 2009 "Selections of Traditional Arts of the Joseon and Goryeo Dynasty, Korea", Hanegi Museum Press
- 2008 "JUN ITAMI 1970–2008", Shufunotomosha
- 2004 "Stone, Wind and Sound", Hakgojae
- 2002 "Jun Itami", Kyuryudo
- 1993 "Jun Itami", Kyuryudo
- 1987 "The Masterpieses: Jun Itami 1970–1987", Kyuryudo
- 1985 "The Space of Korea", Collaboration with Joo Myung-Duck, Kyuryudo
- 1984 "The Hands of 21 Persons", Kyuryudo
- 1983 "The Culture and Architecture of Korea", Kyuryudo
- 1981 "The Architecture of Choson Period", Collaboration with Murai Osamu, Kyuryudo
- 1975 "The Folk Painting of Choson Period", Kodansha

== Projects ==
- JDC Jeju International English City (NCLN), Jeju, Korea (2010)
- Daebo Seowon Valley Clubhouse, Paju, Korea (2010)
- Jeju Polo Clubhouse, Jeju, Korea (2009)
- Church of Sky, Jeju, Korea (2009)
- SK Pangyo Apelbaum, Pangyo, Korea (2009)
- Ssangyong Pyungchang-dong Oboehills, Seoul, Korea (2009)
- Manghyang Museum Competition, Youngam, Korea (2009)
- PINX BIOTOPIA Townhouse, Jeju, Korea (2008)
- Hyundai Taean Golf Village Condo & Community center, Taean, Korea (2008)
- Jeju Howan Golf Clubhouse, Jeju, Korea (2008)
- Jeokseon-dong Y Building, Seoul, Korea (2007)
- Youngchun O’Phel Clubhouse, Yeongcheon, Korea (2007)
- ITM Architects Office, Seoul, Korea(2007)
- Giheung SK Apelbaum Condominium, KyoungGi-do, Korea (2005)
- Yangji Waldhaus, KyoungGi-do, Korea(2005)
- PINX Duson Museum, Jeju, Korea(2005)
- Gwangjuyo Guest House, KyoungGi-do, Korea (2004)
- PINX Museum Water, Wind, Stone, Jeju, Korea (2004)
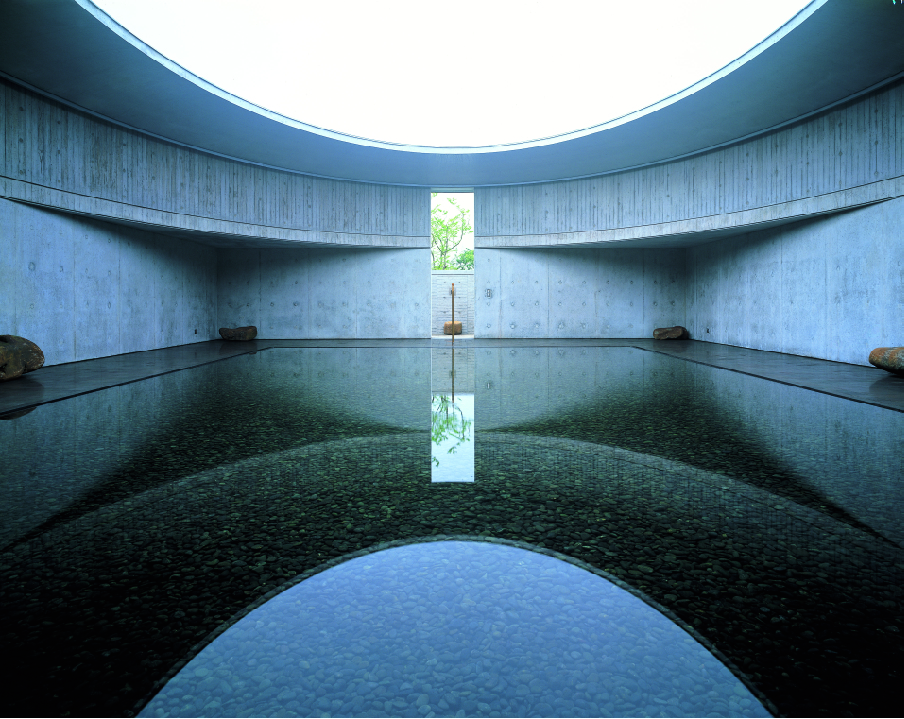
  Three Art Museums 『Water』
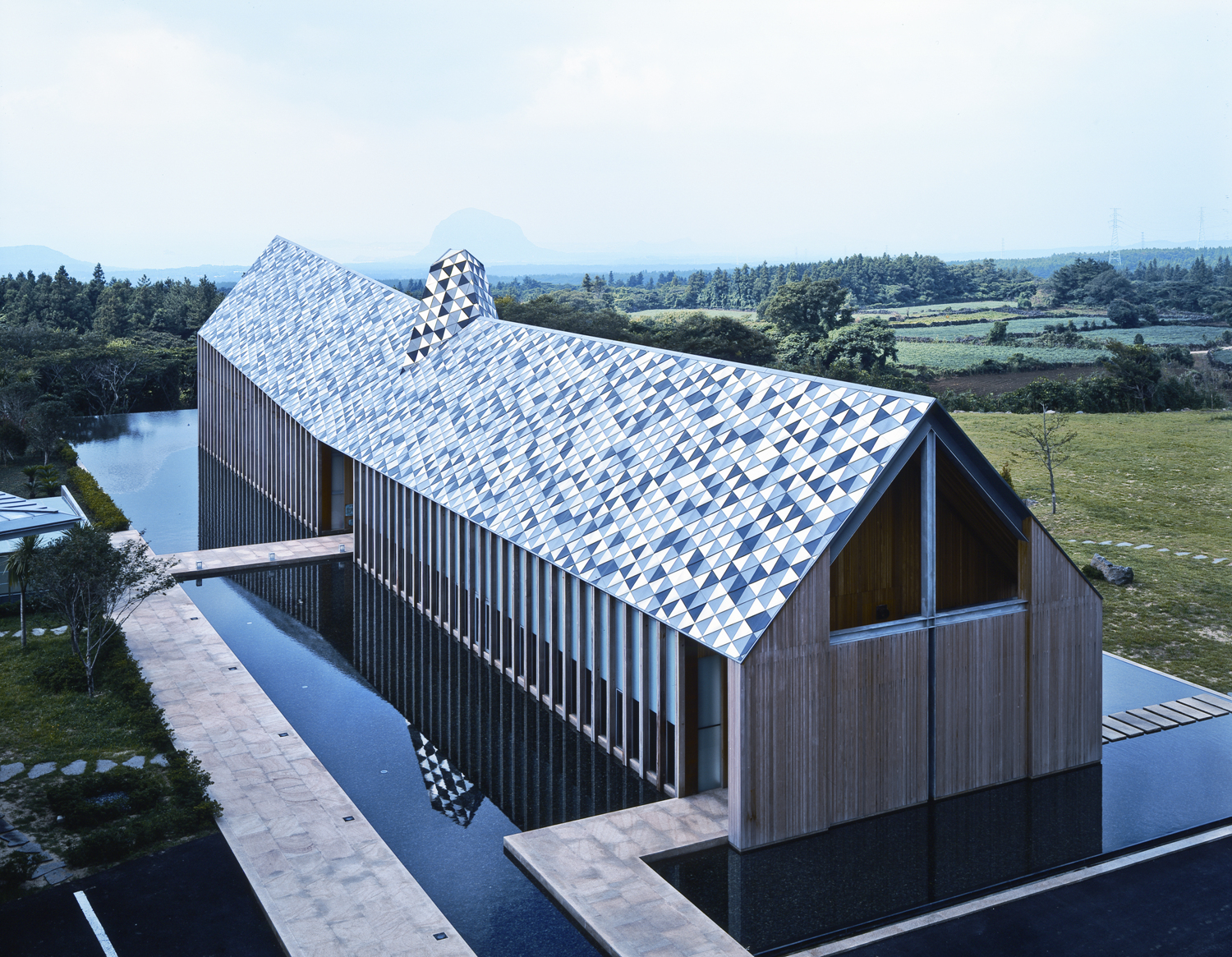
  Church of Sky, Jeju, Korea
- Atelier of Park Dae-sung, Seoul, Korea (2003)
- Hakgojae, Seoul, Korea (2003)
- K-Villa, Jeju, Korea (2003)
- K-Multipurpose Building, Seoul, Korea(2002)
- Suncheon High School, Jeollanam-do Sunchon, Korea (2002)
- Guest House Old & New, KyoungGi-do, Korea (2001)
- Podo Hotel, Jeju, Korea(2001)
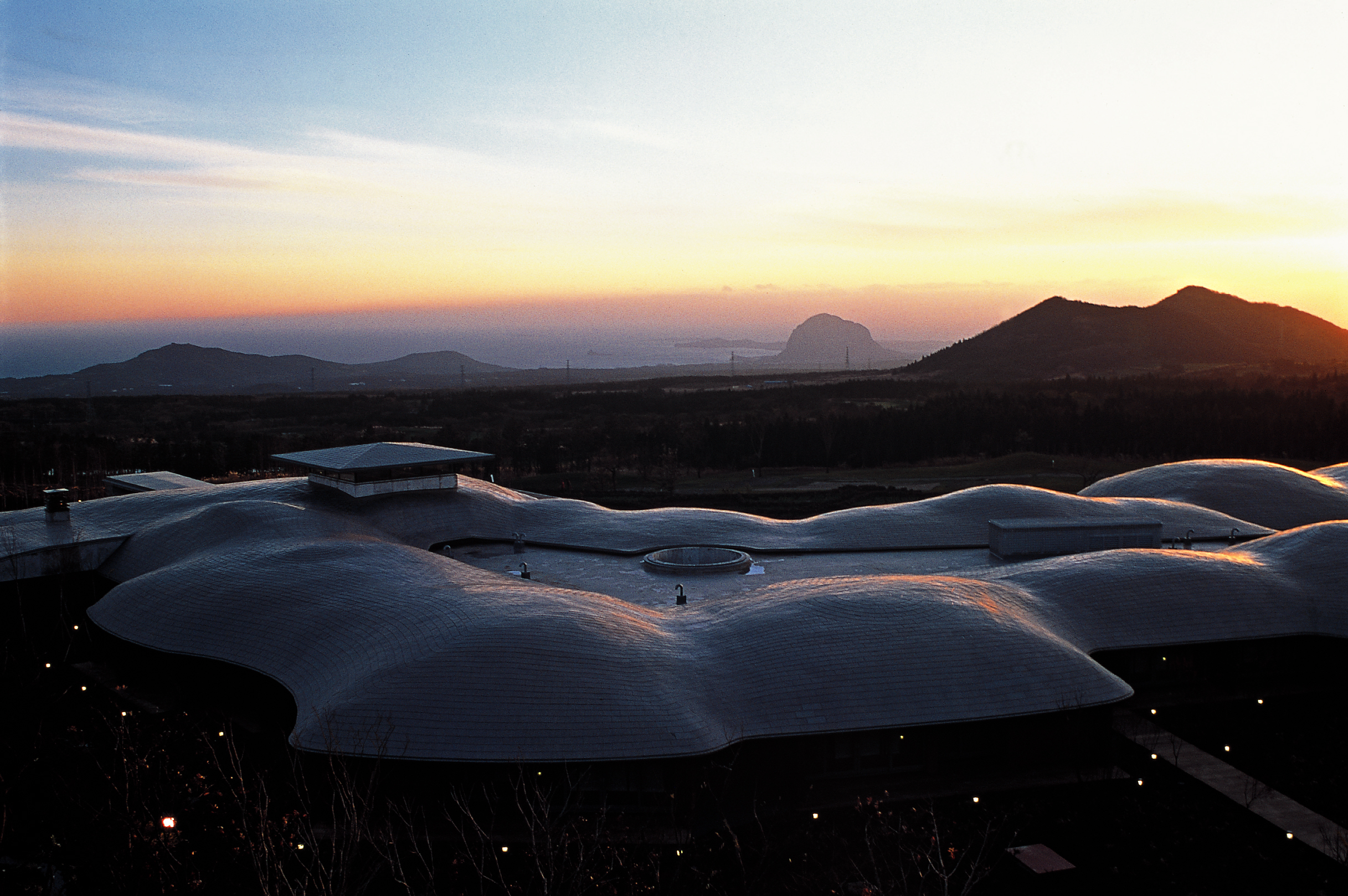
  Guest House PODO Hotel
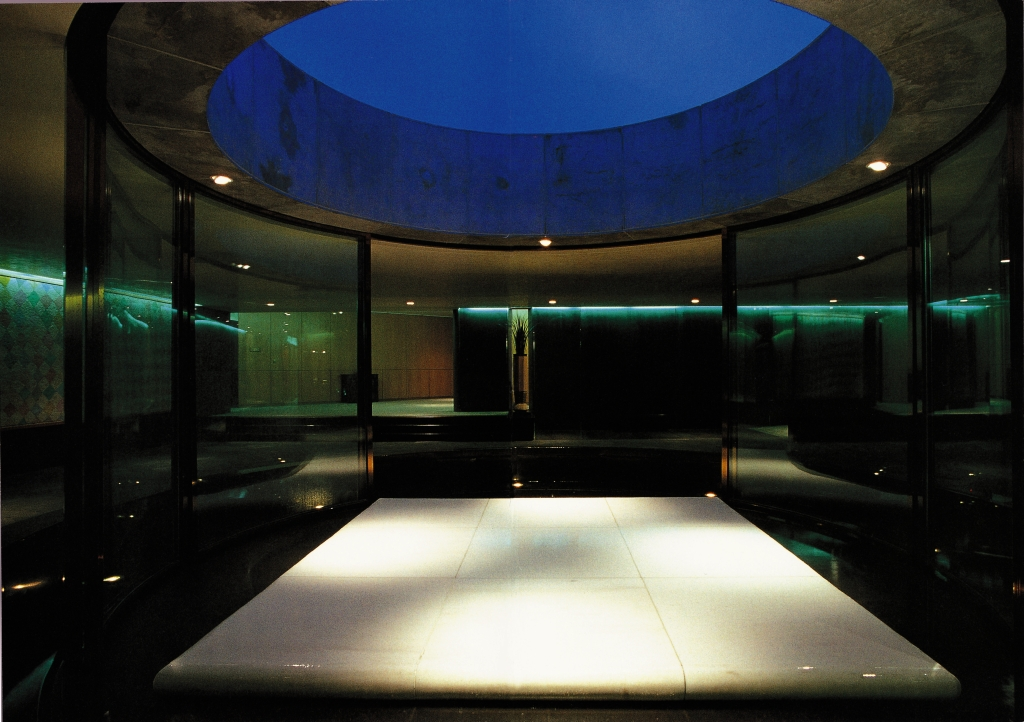
  Guest House PODO Hotel
- 1998 Jeju PINX Clubhouse, Jeju, Korea
- 1997 Space of Sumi/Space of Mizu
- 1996 Church of Wood, Hokkaido, Japan
- 1992 M Building, Tokyo, Japan
- 1991 Church of Stone, Hokkaido, Japan
- 1988 Scarved Tower, Seoul, Korea
- 1985 Suculpor's Studio, Kagawa, Japan
- 1975 India Ink House, Tokyo, Japan
- 1973 Guest House at Karuizawa

== Collections ==
- The Museum of Modern Art, Saitama, Japan
- Museum of Modern Art, Kitakyushu, Japan
- The National Museum of Art, Japan
- Hasegawa Contemporary Museum, Japan
- Collection of Jack Nicholson, U.S.A
- Gwangju City Museum, Korea
- National Museum Cultural Palace, Nicaragua
- Museum national des Arts asiatiques-Guimet, France
- Guggenheim Museum, New York, U.S.A
