= Waseda El Dorado =

Coordinates: 35°42′29.7″N 139°43′18.9″E

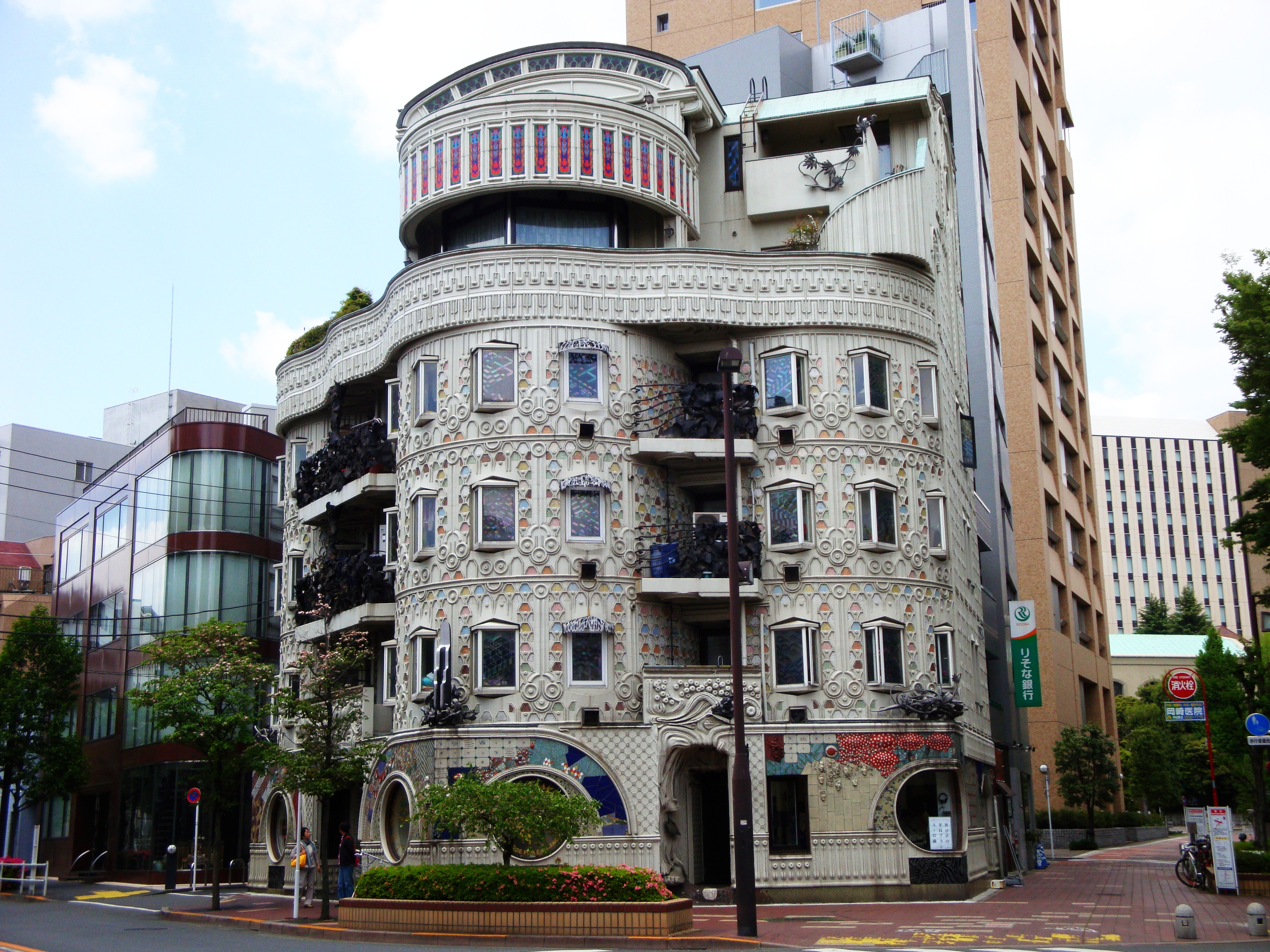
Waseda El Dorado

Waseda El Dorado, also known as Rhythms of Vision, is a building designed by the Japanese architect Von Jour Caux and built in August, 1983. It is located near the Waseda University campus in Shinjuku, Tokyo, Japan.

The building design is a mixture of revival Art Nouveau (or Arts and Crafts) and Japanese culture. Its interior features a Buddhist stave's giant hand pointing down from a ceiling of stained glass. The curving wrought-iron balconies take the form of lily pads, and the wrought-iron banister gracefully zigzags past elegant Art Deco stained-glass windows. Tattoo-designs adorn the ceramic figures, green-gold wallpaper is imprinted by Edo-style woodblocks, and iridescent tiles reflect the art of inlaid mother-of-pearl.

== Gallery ==
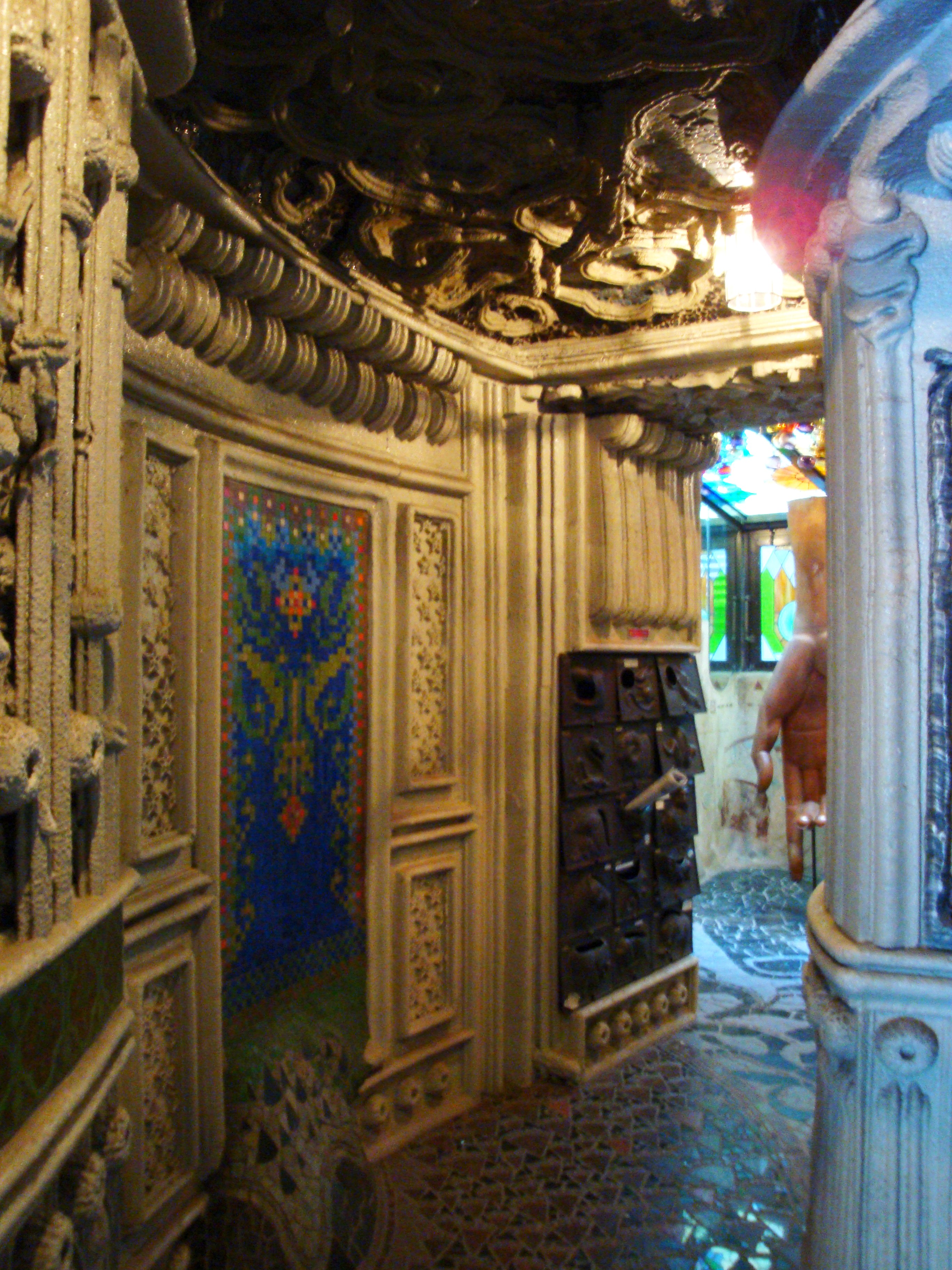
Corridor

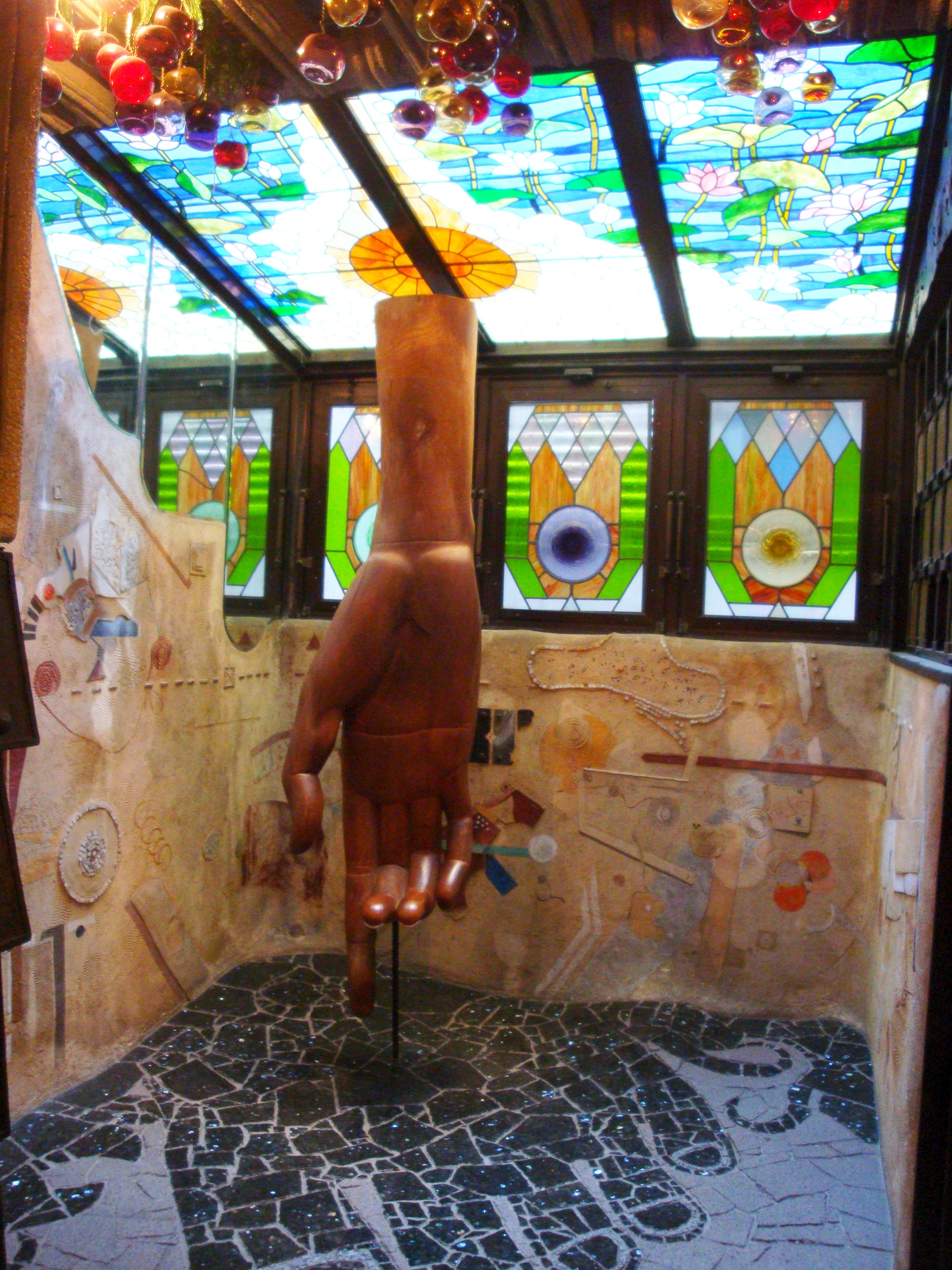
Lobby

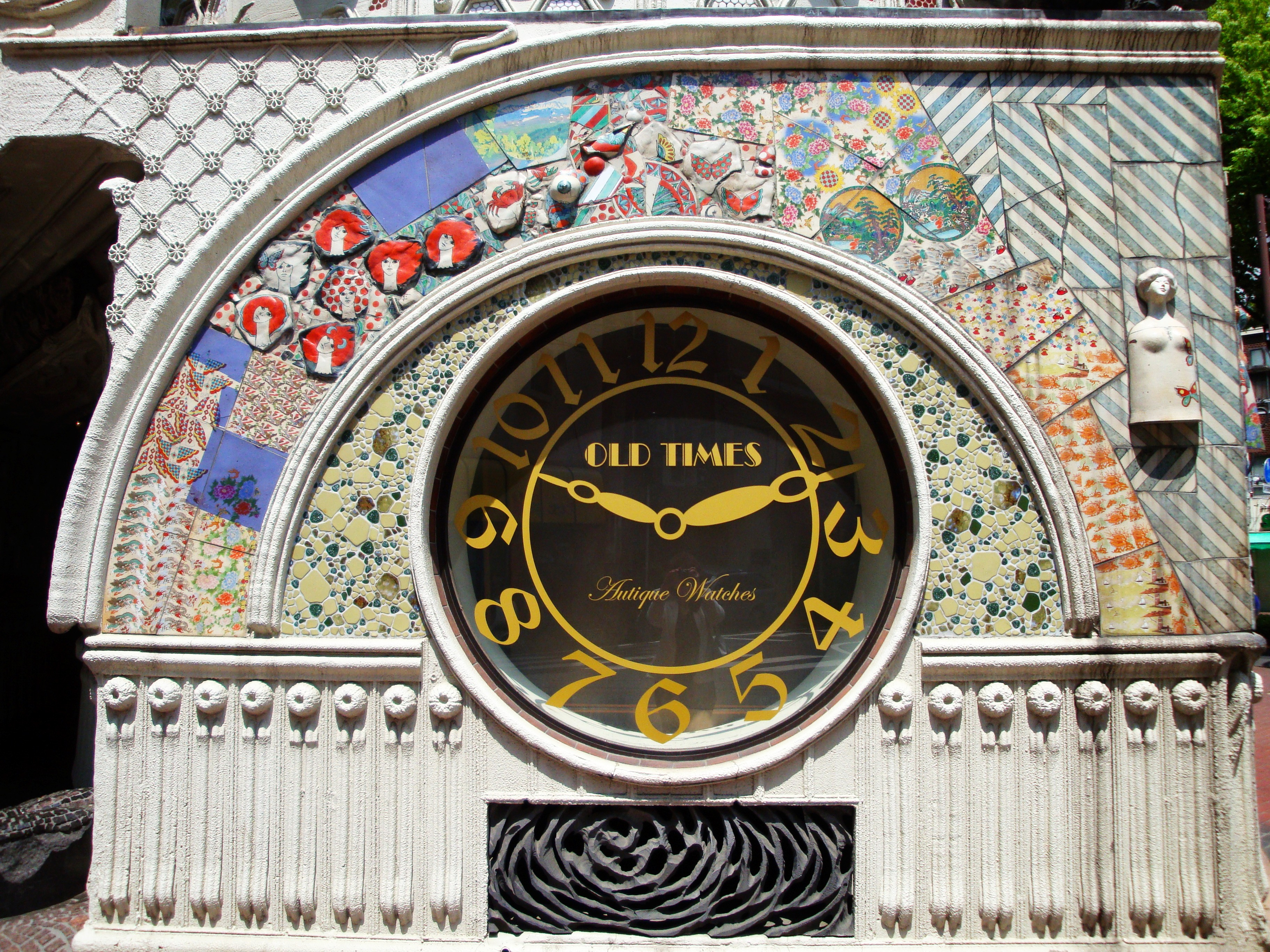
Ground-floor window

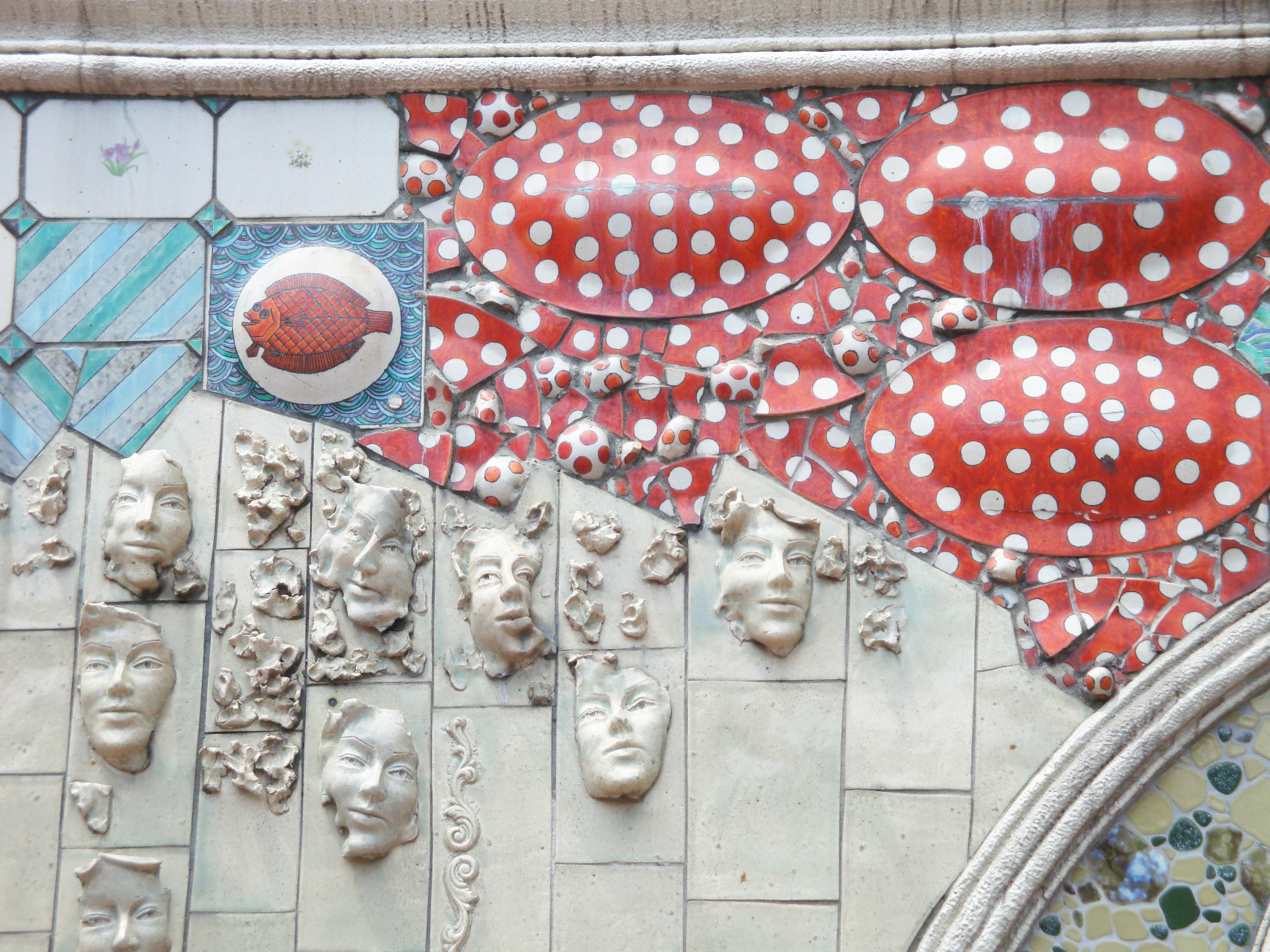
Detail of the facade

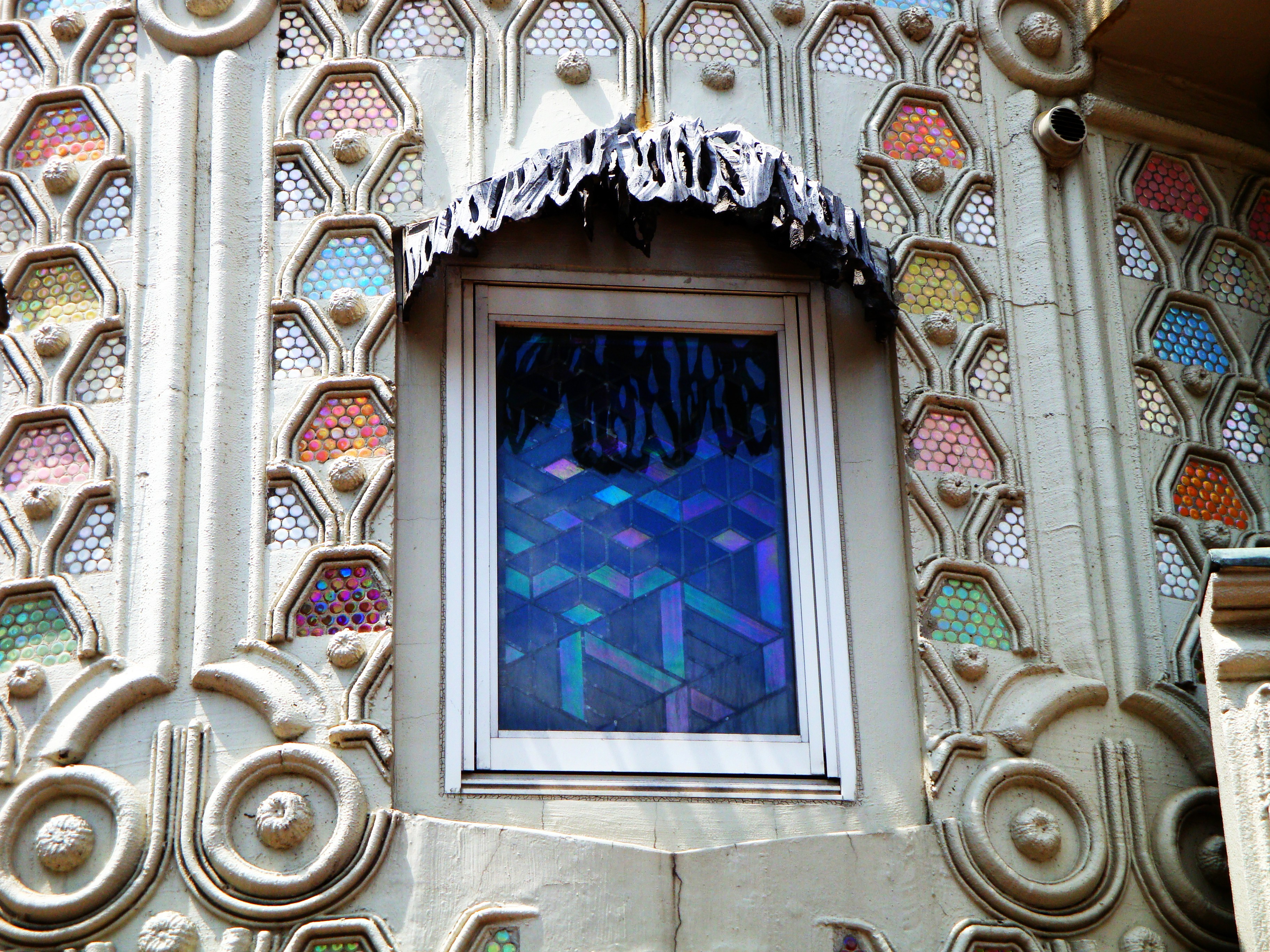
Stained-glass window
