= Nobuko Nakano =

Japanese neuroscientist

Nobuko Nakano (中野信子, born 1975) is a Japanese neuroscientist, holder of a PhD in Medicine, and cognitive scientist.

Born in Tokyo, she is a neuroscientist, cognitive scientist, and a holder of a PhD in Medicine. She has also held the position of a specially appointed professor at Higashi Nippon International University, visiting professor at Kyoto University of the Arts, and member of the board of trustees at the Mori Art Museum. In 2008, she received her doctorate in neurology from the University of Tokyo Medical Science Graduate Program. She returned to Japan after working at the CNRS NeuroSpin (High Magnetic Field MRI) Research Center. She has garnered support for her clear explanations of different phenomena found in human society viewed from a scientific lens along with themes of the brain and psychology.

== Biography ==
Nakano graduated from the Faculty of Engineering at the University of Tokyo, later earning a master's degree from its Graduate School of Medicine in 2004 and a doctorate in medicine (neurology) in 2008. From 2008 to 2010, she served as a researcher at the Saclay Nuclear Research Centre in France.

Lucky People: A Neuroscientist's Guide to Attracting Luck, Cultivating Success and Leading a Happier Life — the English translation of her bestselling Japanese book "科学がつきとめた「運のいい人」" — analyzes the concept of luck through a neuroscientific lens.

== Published Works ==
=== Publications by Kodansha Ltd. ===
・"Kuuki o Yomu Nou (The Brain That Reads the Atmosphere)" (February 19, 2020)

・"No kara Miru Myujiamu (The Museum from the Perspective of the Brain: Art Cultivates the Mind)" (October 20, 2020), Co-author: Hiroshi Kumazawa

・"Perusona (Persona: The Darkness Hidden in the Brain)" (October 20, 2020)

・"Ikenie Sagasi (Searching for a Sacrifice: The Runaway Brain)" (April 20, 2021), Co-author: Mari Yamazaki

・"Warai no Aru Sekai ni Umareta to Iu Koto (What It Means to Be Born into the World with Laughter)" (October 18, 2023), Co-author: Daiki Kanechika

・"Majinai no Nokagaku (The Neuroscience of Incantations)" (March 4, 2025)

・"Shinpan Kuuki o Yomu Nou (New Edition: The Brain That Reads the Atmosphere)" (May 25, 2026)
