= Jun Mitsui =

Japanese architect (born 1955)

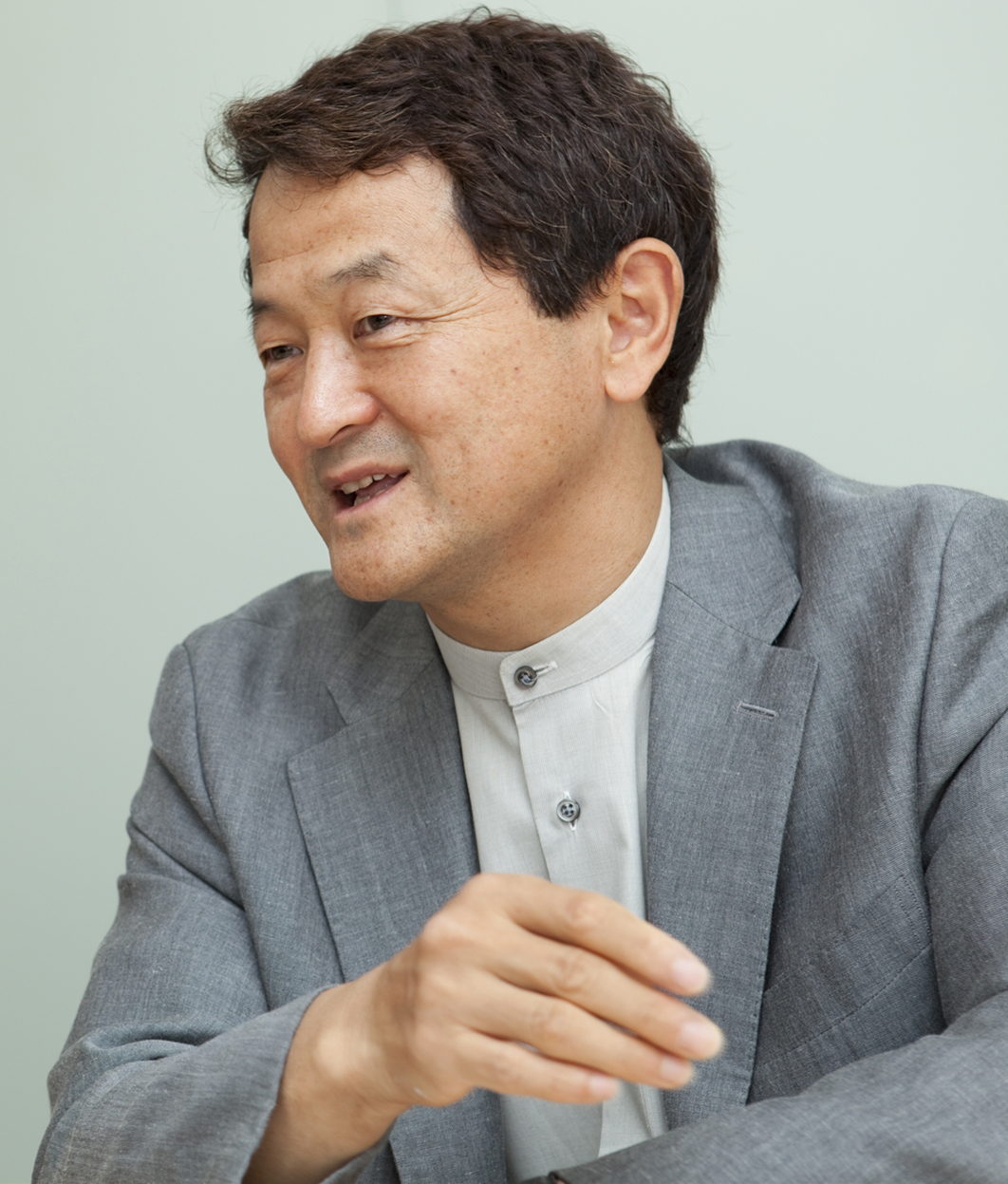
- Jun Mitsui (2010)
- Born: Iwakuni, Yamaguchi
- Occupation: Architect
- Practice: Jun Mitsui & Associates Architects
- Buildings: The Jewels of Aoyama, 2005 De Beers Ginza Building, 2007; The Ice Cubes, 2008 HongDae Project:Yellow Diamond, 2010

Jun Mitsui (born 1955 in Iwakuni, Yamaguchi, Japan) is a Japanese architect known for designing high-rise buildings and high-end retail buildings in Japan and other countries.

After graduating from Tokyo University, Jun Mitsui worked for Architect Shin'ichi Okada in Japan until 1982.

After he received his Master of Architecture from Yale University in 1984, he practiced at Cesar Pelli & Associates, Inc. until 1992.

He returned to Tokyo as a principal of Pelli Clarke Pelli Architects Japan and went on to found Jun Mitsui & Associates, Architects in 1995.

Jun Mitsui is a member of American Institute of Architects, Japan Institute of Architects and Japan Architects Academy, and is a licensed architect in both Japan and the United States. In 2007, he served as a president of AIA Japan. He and his firm have been honored with numerous architectural awards.

== Gallery ==
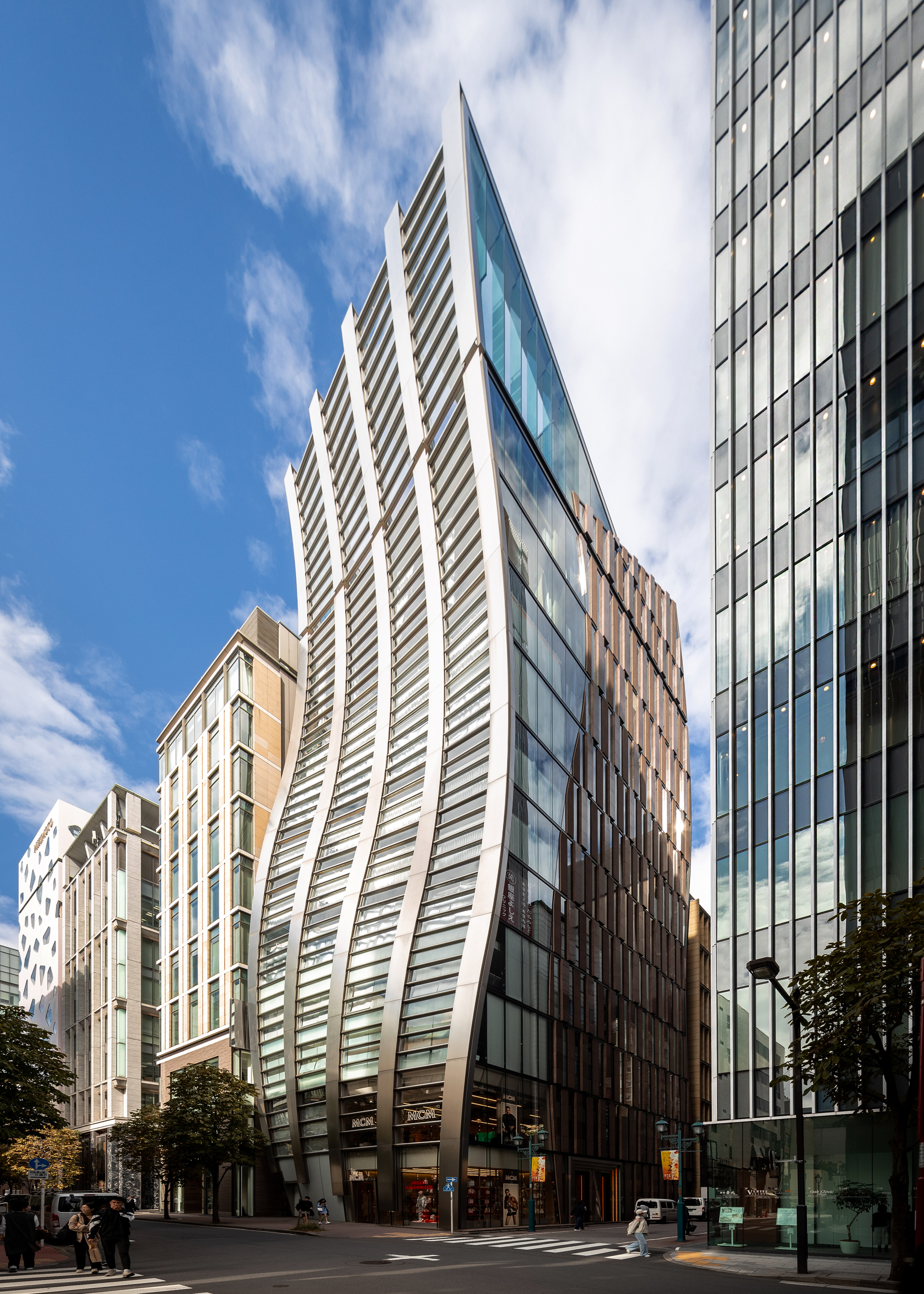
De Beers Ginza Building
