= Nobu (given name) =

Nobu is a unisex given name. Notable people with this name include:

- Nobu Adilman, Canadian television personality
- Nobu Hayashi (born 1978), Japanese karateka and kickboxer
- Nobu Jo (1872–1959), Japanese Christian philanthropist
- Nobu Kōda (1870–1946), Japanese composer, violinist, and music teacher
- Nobu Matsuhisa (born 1949), Japanese celebrity chef
- Nobu McCarthy (1934–2002), Japanese-Canadian actress, fashion model, and stage director
- Nobu Naruse (born 1984), Japanese cross-country skier
- Nobu Shirase (1861–1946), Japanese army officer and explorer
- Nobuyuki Siraisi (1934–2016), artist and designer
- Nobu Su, Chinese businessman
- Nobu Tamura, French-born Japanese-American paleoartist and physicist

== Fictional characters ==
- Nobu (Ninjago), in Ninjago
