= Waseda Station =

Waseda Station is the name of two train stations in Japan:

- Waseda Station (Tokyo Metro), a rapid transit station in Shinjuku, Tokyo.
- Waseda Station (Toden), a light rail station in Shinjuku, Tokyo.
- Nishi-waseda Station, a rapid transit station in Shinjuku, Tokyo.
- Honjō-Waseda Station, a Shinkansen rail station in Honjō.
