= Von Jour Caux =

Von Jour Caux (梵寿綱, Bon Jukō) is the pseudonym of Toshiro Tanaka (田中 俊郎, Tanaka Toshirō) (born 27 January 1934 in Asakusa, Tokyo), a Japanese architect, artist, and thinker. He has been referred to as the Japanese Gaudi.

== Pseudonym ==
The pseudonym Von Jour Caux combines concepts from ancient Sanskrit texts (Upanishads) and the posthumous name of his adoptive father. More precisely, Brahman is written bon (Von) in Chinese letters, ju (Jour) means "blessed life", and kou (Caux) means "rope", which the architect translates into "a tight rope between blessed life and ultimate reality". Jukou (Ju-Kou) was also his adoptive father's posthumous buddhist name.

== Biography ==
Von Jour Caux studied architecture at the Waseda University and opened an architect firm in 1958.

He travelled to Chicago in 1962, inspired by architects such as Ludwig Mies van der Rohe, and studied painting, sculpture, and arts and crafts at the School of the Art Institute of Chicago, where he met his future wife. In 1971, he abandoned his conventional architectural practice and, along with his wife, formed a group of artists and craftsmen called Art Complex in 1974, the year he adopted the artist pseudonym Von Jour Caux The "Art Complex Movement" is the revival of "Arts and Crafts Movement" in architectural space, such as the use of ornaments, symbolic icons and style.

The group's first project was the Waseda El Dorado (ドラード早稲田 or Shito) in Tokyo built around a "city of gold" utopy. In 1985, he delivered the Mukōdai Home For the Aged erected in Higashiyamato, Tokyo where he focused on the end of life phenomenon taking place in the building. In 1990, he designed the La Porta Izumi apartment building in Tokyo. The building has a distinctive facade of a monumental sculpted body-bent woman with hair falling down cascade-like and mixing with the fire of a torch at the lower levels of the building. In 1992, he designed the aquatic Mind Waa building in Tokyo in collaboration with the building owner.

== Style ==
Von Jour Caux was referred to as the Gaudi of Japan. His work endorse similar shaping logics, but the Japanese architect is rather filled with ideologies from esoteric Buddhism and animism. Antimodernist, his work is more associated to the eclectic catalog of Art Nouveau. Compared to Gaudi, Von Jour Caux gave complete autonomy to his craftsmen, his work truly being the work of the Art Complex Movement.

Waseda El Dorado in Tokyo
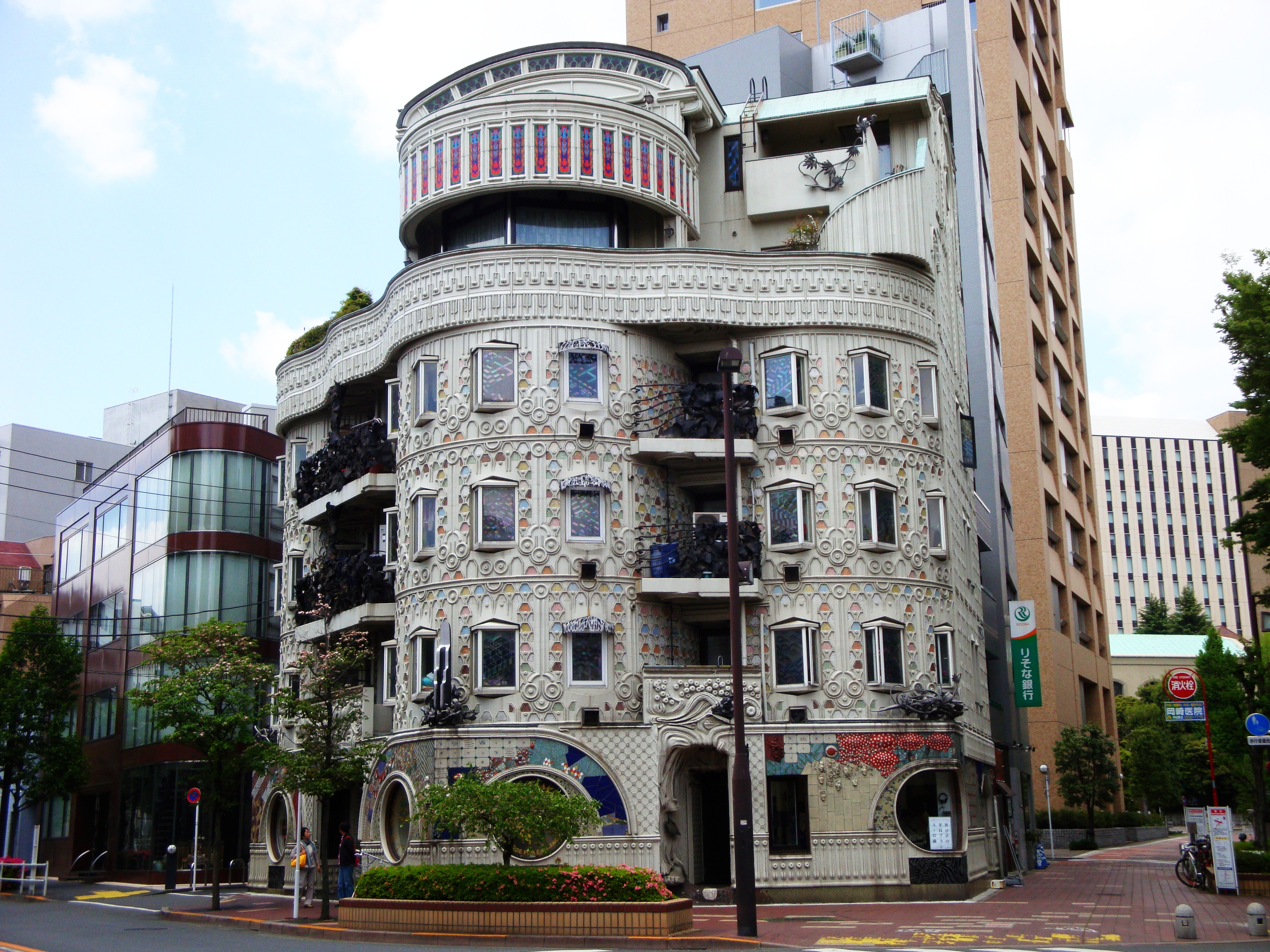
Facade

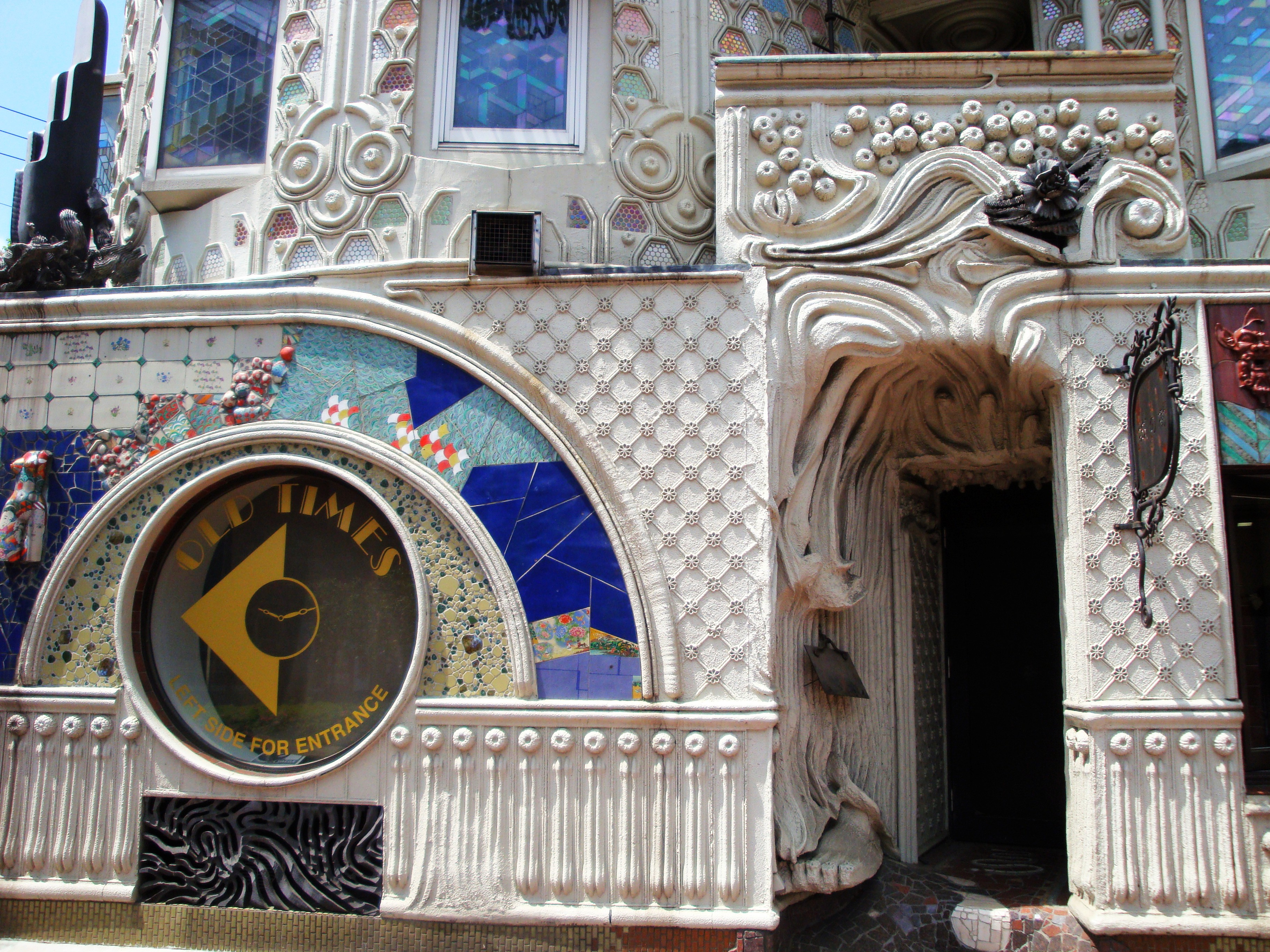
Detail of facade

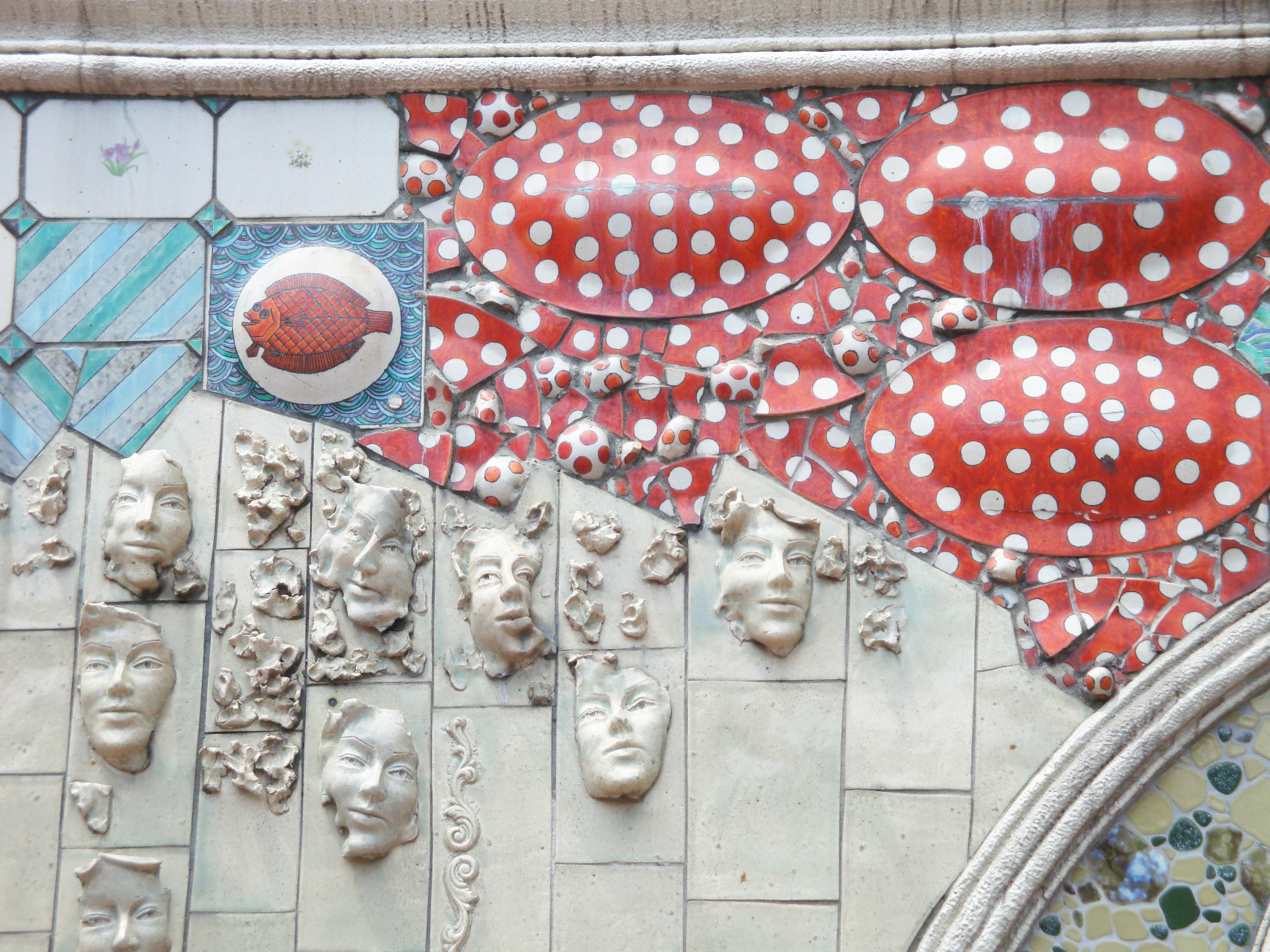
Motifs on facade

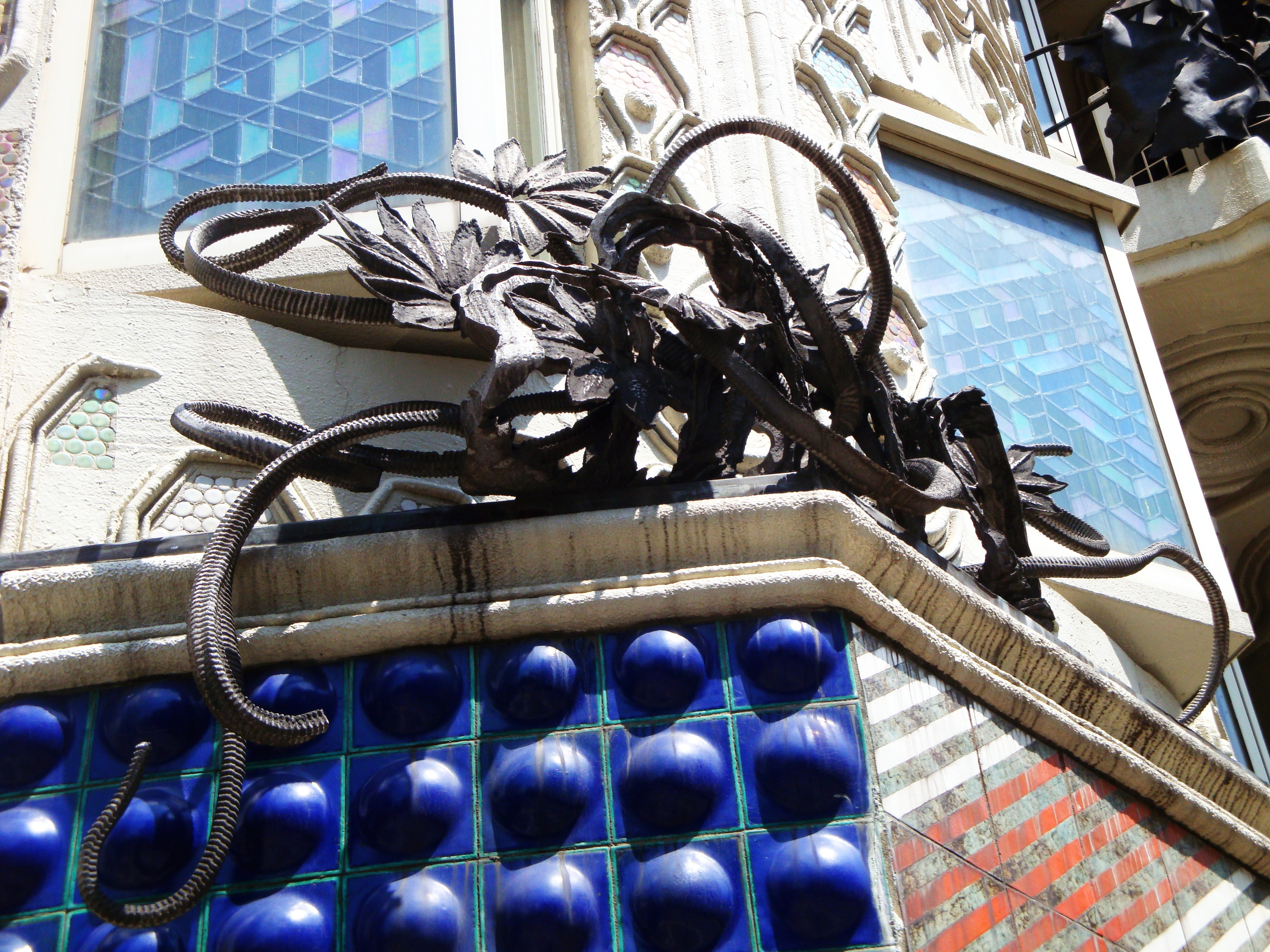
Sculpture on facade

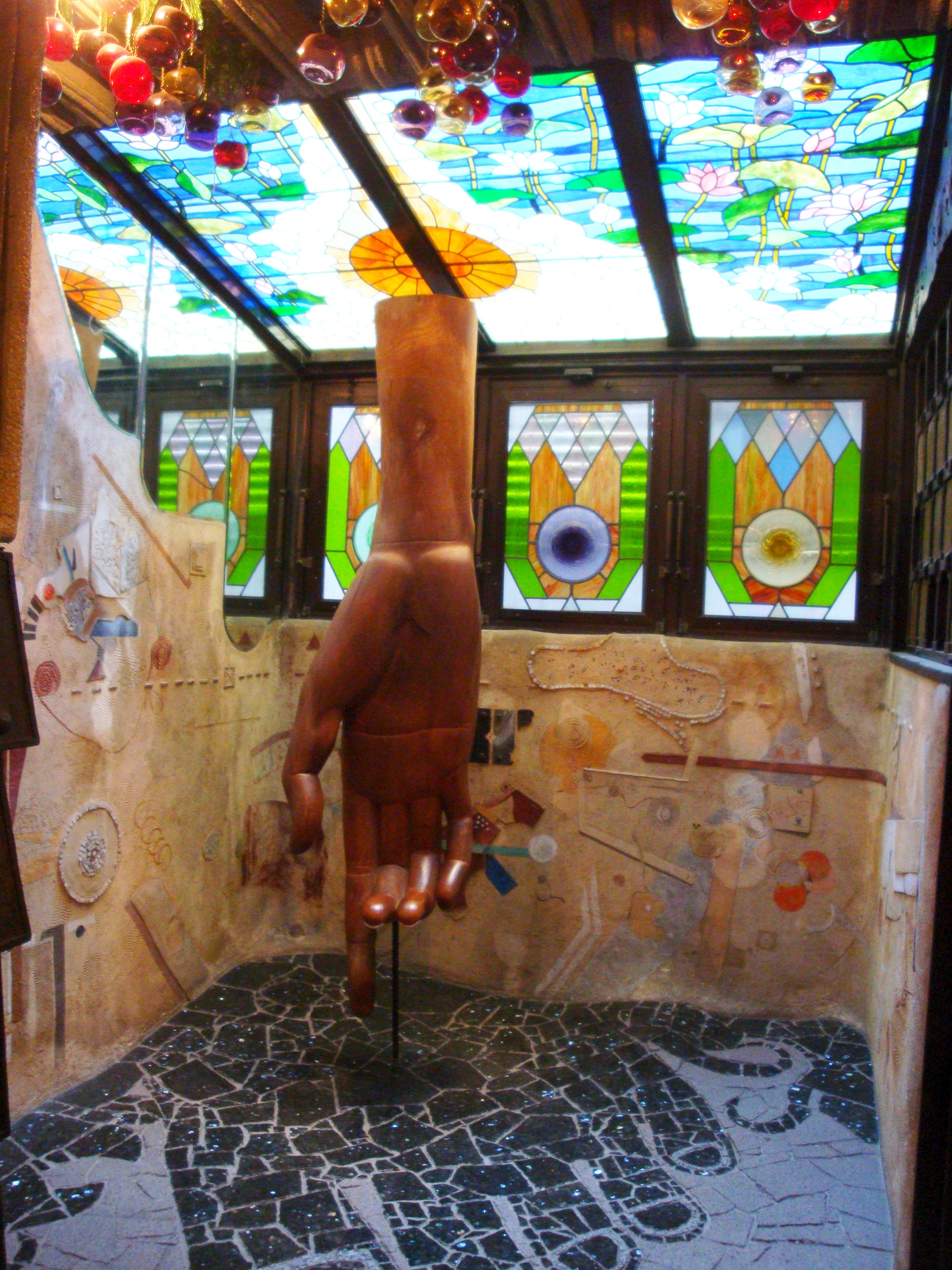
Hand

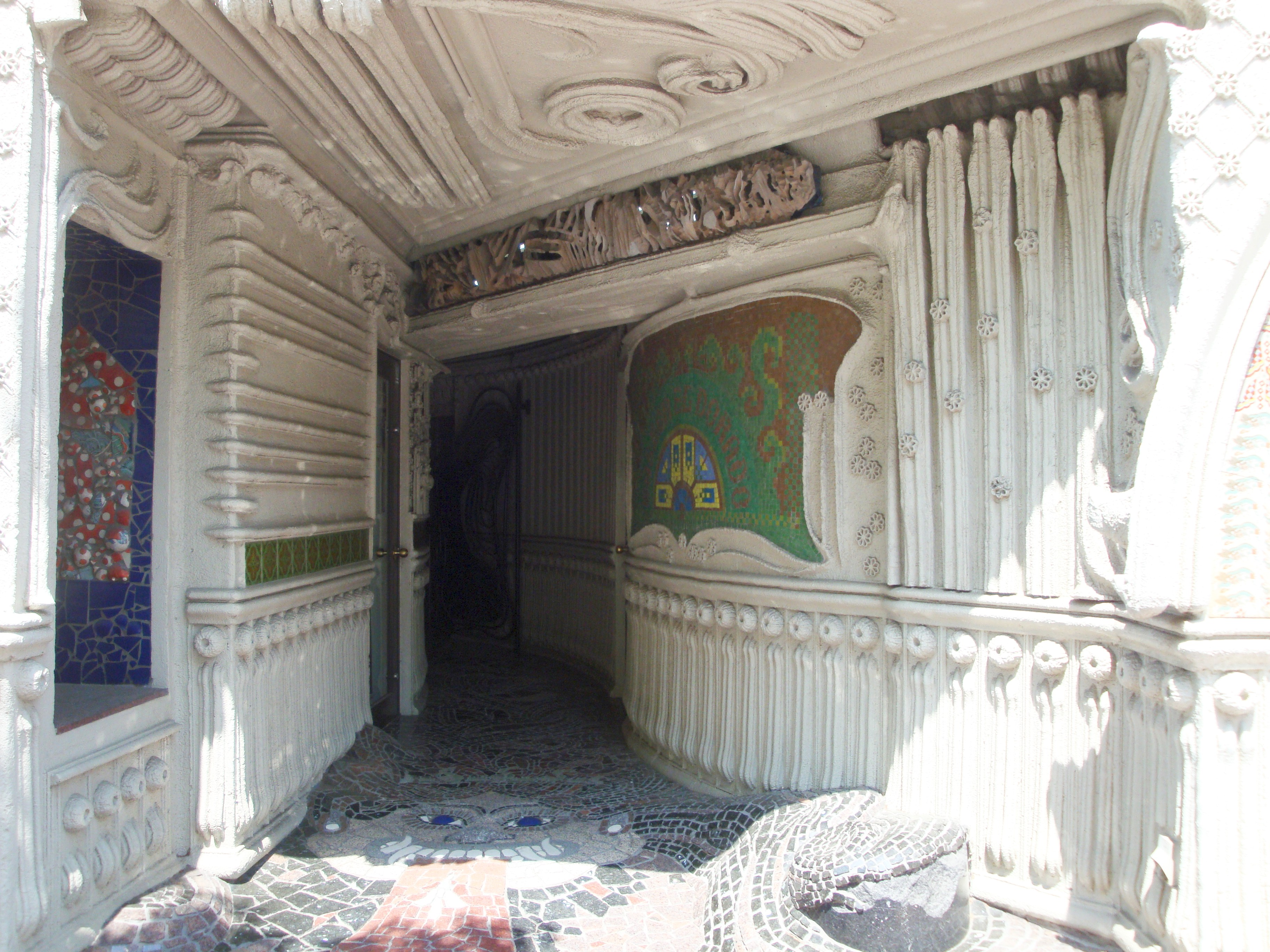
Hallway

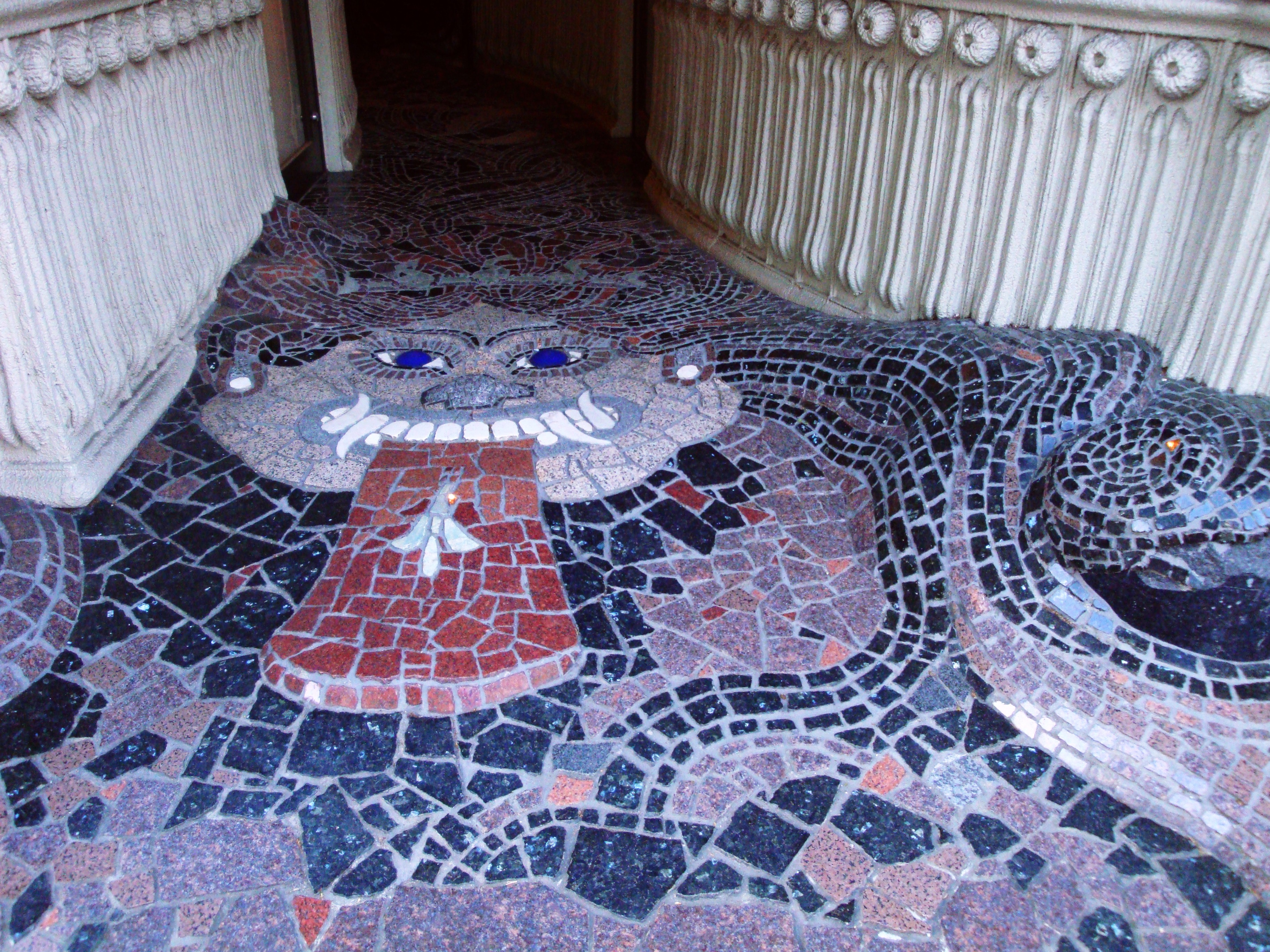
Corridor

He also designed the Le bois Hiraki Minamiikebukuro Building in Toshima, Tokyo, and the Tsukada building in Tokyo with a very sober style.

== See also ==
- Waseda El Dorado
