= Nobue =

- Gender: Female

Origin
- Origin: Japanese
- Meaning: Different meanings depending on the kanji used

Nobue (written: 信恵) is a feminine Japanese given name. Notable people with the name include:

- Betty Nobue Kano (born 1944), Japanese artist
- Nobue Yamazaki (山崎 信恵; born 1950), Japanese gymnast

== Fictional characters ==
- Nobue Ito (伊藤 伸恵), a character in the manga series Strawberry Marshmallow
- Nobue Todoroki (轟 信恵), a character in the anime series A Place Further than the Universe
