= Nobuko Tsuchiura =

Japanese architect

Nobuko Tsuchiura (1900–1998) was the first woman architect in Japan.

The wife of architect Kameki Tsuchiura, she trained with Frank Lloyd Wright. At the time, there was no school for women to study architecture in Japan. Kameki worked with Wright on the Imperial Hotel. Kameki and Nobuko came to the United States to work for him for two years as draftsmen. After their return to Japan in 1926, they designed several houses and in 1935 Kameki established his architectural firm. Besides designing homes, the firm also experimented with furniture design. However, her work was usually presented under her husband's name, not her own. In 1937, she joined the Ladies’ Photo Club; at the time, photography was considered to be a more appropriate activity for women than architecture.

Nobuko Ogawa and Atsuko Tanaka have published a book Big Little Nobu. Student of Frank Lloyd Wright Woman Architect Nobuko Tsuchiura.

Learning a lot from Wright in the United States, their sketches and construction drawings had been displayed at an exhibition at the Edo-Tokyo Open Air Architectural Museum in Koganei Park in Tokyo. Most of their exhibits were shown Wright-style as they had learned. They are improving their style to new international style that came from Europe.
