= Nobuko Nakahara =

- 中原暢子
- Born: January 5, 1929; Urawa, Saitama
- Died: July 5, 2008 (aged 79)
- Education: Musashi Institute of Technology

Nobuko Nakahara (Japanese: 中原暢子, January 5, 1929 – July 5, 2008) was a Japanese architect who reached prominence after World War II. Nakahara was one of the first women to become a Class 1 licensed architect in Japan. During the 21st Century, she did majority of works in Japan but very less works in western field.

== Biography ==
=== Early life ===
Nobuko Nakahara was born in Urawa, Saitama in 1929. When she was 12 years old, she entered a girls' high school, but was not able to finish because of the Pacific War which turned the school turned into a factory. During the war, she stayed in Urawa. Many houses survived but people were under restricted control of using light. After getting used to living in the dark, Nakahara "felt how bright the world was." She claimed the experience initiated her interest in light and Shadow.

=== Education ===
In 1945, she matriculated to Kasei-Gakuin Special School in home economics program, educating women to be a good housewife and a good mother. After graduation, Nakahara found herself dissatisfied with her course of study and resolved to pursue architecture at Musashi Institute of Technology, the current Tokyo City University in 1951. Her effort and work were approved by Kiyoshi Ikebe. Between 1952 and 1958, she pursued postgraduate education at the Institute of Industrial Science University of Tokyo, where she actively contributed to Kiyoshi Ikebe's research topic, "the cubic minimum house" (Japanese: 立体最小限住居の設計).

=== Death ===
Nobuko Nakahara died on July 5, 2008, at age 79.

== Career ==
In 1955, Nobuko Nakahara worked at Kenji Hirose, Architect & Associates, gaining valuable professional experience in the field. In 1957, she achieved a significant milestone by acquiring the Class 1 architecture license in Japan, becoming one of the first women in the country to obtain this license.

In 1958, she co-founded the firm Hayashi-Yamada-Nakahara, Architects and Preservation, where she dedicated her expertise to architectural and preservation projects.

In 1985, Nobuko Nakahara was appointed as an associate professor in the Faculty of Home Economics at Tokyo Kasei Gakuin University, and her commitment to academia led her to become a professor in the same faculty in 1988. Throughout her career, she has been dedicated to advancing the field of architecture and promoting the significance of home economics in education and practice.

== Projects ==
1962 - Chokakuin Buddhist Temple in Saitama, Japan (Japanese: 長覚院)

- The temple located in a quiet residential area. Its large free interior space was achieved by combining four HP shells. The most advanced technology derived from post war society was adapted to present traditional Japanese architecture as a modern construction.

1964- Kimuraya Villa (Japanese: 木村別邸)

- Scholars believed it is a combination of Structural Functionalism and Japanese Style. The villa exposed the interior structure but thoughtfully designed a harmonious Japanese-style decorated space with traditional elements.

1968 - Fan-shaped House/Tsuji Villa (Japanese: 扇形の家/辻別邸)

1972 - Maeda Villa (Japanese: M氏別邸)

1985 - Chashitsu no aru ie (Japanese: 茶室のある家, lit. 'Tea House')

== Influence ==
She participated in PODOKO (named from pensedo, kiskutedo, and kureedo, in Esperanto meaning “while thinking, discussing, and creating”), an association of women architects created in 1953 while female workers were treated with contempt on the building site. She founded this organization with 28 women architects to bravely acquire rights, not individually, but emphasizing the importance of being collectively. In 1963, Nakahara helped to initiate the 6th Congress of UIFA as an intern architect in Paris. UIFA's concept of providing female architects an opportunity to communicate with international colleagues followed her ideology to gather female architects together. Then, She became the first president of the Japan branch of the UIFA (French: L'Union Internationale des Femmes Architectes, lit. 'International Union of Women Architects'), UIFA JAPON. The organization was dedicated to building international connections with UIFA and other oversea organizations.

Nakahara had revolutionary design concepts and many titles to prove her profession. However, it is still very hard to find any material documenting her bio and works. She devoted herself to speaking for female architects in unfriendly circumstances. Following the feminism waves, Nakahara shifted her focus from architecture and design to education and feminism movements. There are many studies about her works around the 2000s, and Japanese Scholars titled her to be "a tea ceremony architect with a deep knowledge of Japanese culture," (Japanese: 日本文化に造詣の深い茶人建築家) based on her effort of organizing the 12th UIFA Congress, Tokyo, Japan, in 1988; while she performed the tea ceremony to welcome 300 members in the congress.

== See also ==
- Masako Hayashi
