= Metabolism (architecture) =

1960s–1980s Japanese architectural movement

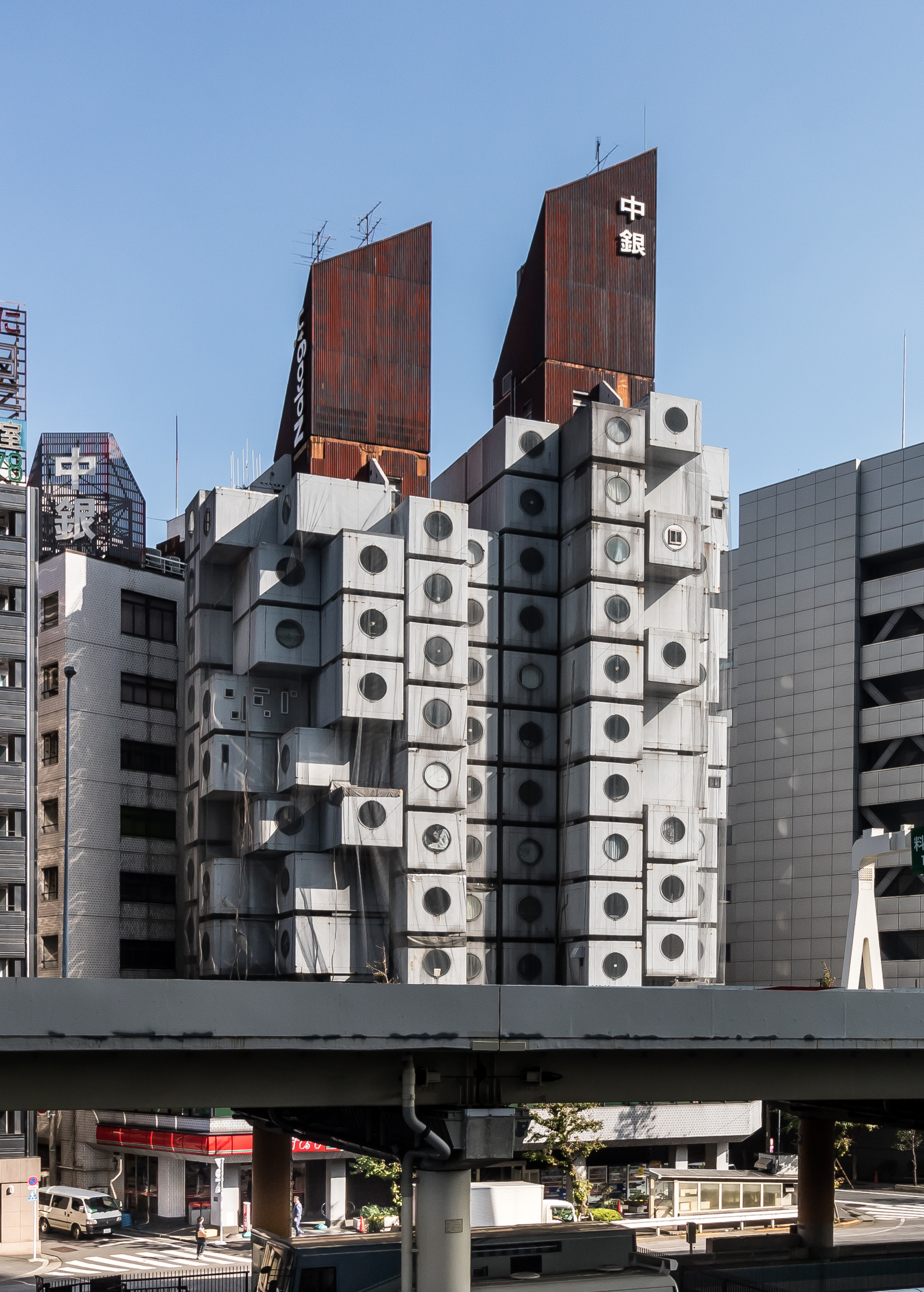
The Nakagin Capsule Tower in Tokyo displayed small apartment units (capsules) attached to a central building core.

Metabolism (Japanese: メタボリズム, Hepburn: metaborizumu; also shinchintaisha (新陳代謝)) was a post-war Japanese biomimetic architectural movement that fused ideas about architectural megastructures with those of organic biological growth. It had its first international exposure during CIAM's 1959 meeting and its ideas were tentatively tested by students from Kenzo Tange's MIT studio.

During the preparation for the 1960 Tokyo World Design Conference, a group of young architects and designers, including Kiyonori Kikutake, Kisho Kurokawa and Fumihiko Maki, prepared the publication of the Metabolism manifesto. They were influenced by a wide variety of sources, including Marxist theories and biological processes. Their manifesto was a series of four essays entitled: Ocean City, Space City, Towards Group Form, and Material and Man, and it also included designs for vast cities that floated on the oceans and plug-in capsule towers that could incorporate organic growth. Although the World Design Conference gave the Metabolists exposure on the international stage, their ideas remained largely theoretical.

Some smaller, individual buildings that employed the principles of Metabolism were built and these included Tange's Yamanashi Press and Broadcaster Centre and Kurokawa's Nakagin Capsule Tower. The greatest concentration of their work was to be found at the 1970 World Exposition in Osaka, where Tange was responsible for master planning the whole site whilst Kikutake and Kurokawa designed pavilions. After the 1973 oil crisis, the Metabolists turned their attention away from Japan and toward Africa and the Middle East.

== Origins ==
The Congrès Internationaux d'Architecture Moderne (CIAM) was founded in Switzerland in 1928 as an association of architects who wanted to advance modernism into an international setting. During the early 1930s they promoted the idea (based upon new urban patterns in the United States) that urban development should be guided by CIAM's four functional categories: dwelling, work, transportation, and recreation. By the mid-1930s Le Corbusier and other architects had moulded CIAM into a pseudo-political party with the goal of promoting modern architecture to all. This view gained some traction in the immediate post-war period when Le Corbusier and his colleagues began to design buildings in Chandigarh. By the early 1950s it was felt that CIAM was losing its avant-garde edge so in 1954 a group of younger members called "Team 10" was formed. This included the inner circle Dutch architects Jacob Bakema and Aldo van Eyck, Italian Giancarlo De Carlo, Greek Georges Candilis, the British architects Peter and Alison Smithson and the American Shadrach Woods. The Team 10 architects introduced concepts like "human association", "cluster" and "mobility", with Bakema encouraging the combination of architecture and planning in urban design. This was a rejection of CIAM's older four function mechanical approach, and it would ultimately lead to the break-up and end of CIAM.

Kenzo Tange was invited to the CIAM '59 meeting of the association in Otterlo, Netherlands. In what was to be the last meeting of CIAM, he presented two theoretical projects by the architect Kiyonori Kikutake: the Tower-shaped City and Kikutake's own home, the Sky House. This presentation exposed the fledgling Metabolist movement to its first international audience. Like Team 10's "human association" concepts, Metabolism too was exploring new concepts in urban design.

Tower-shaped City was a 300-metre-tall (980 ft) tower that housed the infrastructure for an entire city. It included transportation, services and a manufacturing plant for prefabricated houses. The tower was vertical "artificial land" onto which steel, pre-fabricated dwelling capsules could be attached. Kikutake proposed that these capsules would undergo self-renewal every fifty years, and the city would grow organically like branches of a tree.

Constructed on a hillside, the Sky House is a platform supported on four concrete panels with a hyperbolic paraboloid shell roof. It is a single space divided by storage units with the kitchen and bathroom on the outer edge. These latter two were designed so that they could be moved to suit the use of the house—and, indeed, they have been moved and/or adjusted about seven times over the course of fifty years. At one point a small children's room was attached to the bottom of the main floor with a small child-sized access door between the two rooms.

After the meeting, Tange left for Massachusetts Institute of Technology to begin a four-month period as a visiting professor. It is possible that based upon the reception of Kikutake's projects in Otterlo he decided to set the fifth year project as a design for a residential community of 25,000 inhabitants to be constructed on the water of Boston Bay. Tange felt a natural desire to produce urban designs based upon a new prototype of design, one that could give a more human connection to super-scale cities. He considered the idea of "major" and "minor" city structure and how this could grow in cycles like the trunk and leaves of a tree.

One of the seven projects produced by the students was a perfect example of his vision. The project consisted of two primary residential structures each of which was triangular in section. Lateral movement was provided by motorways and monorail, whilst vertical movement from the parking areas was via elevators. There were open spaces within for community centres, and at every third level there were walkways along which were rows of family houses. The project appeared to be based upon Tange's unrealised competition entry for the World Health Organization headquarters in Geneva and both projects paved the way for his later project, "Plan for Tokyo – 1960". Tange went on to present both the Boston Bay Project and the Tokyo Plan at the Tokyo World Design Conference.

== Tokyo World Design Conference, 1960 ==
The conference had its roots with Isamu Konmochi and Sori Yanagi who were representatives of the Japanese Committee on the 1956 International Design Conference in Aspen, Colorado. They suggested that rather than a four yearly conference in Aspen there should be a roving conference with Tokyo as its first setting in 1960. Three Japanese institutional members were responsible for organising the conference, although after the Japan Industrial Design Association pulled out only the Japan Institute of Architects and the Japan Association of Advertising Arts were left. In 1958 they formed a preparation committee led by Junzo Sakakura, Kunio Maekawa and Kenzo Tange. As Tange had just accepted an invitation to be a visiting professor at Massachusetts Institute of Technology he recommended his junior colleague Takashi Asada to replace him in the organisation of the conference programmes.

The young Asada invited two friends to help him: the architectural critic and former editor of the magazine Shinkenchiku, Noboru Kawazoe, and Kisho Kurokawa who was one of Tange's students. In turn these two men scouted for more talented designers to help, including: the architects Masato Otaka and Kiyonori Kikutake and the designers Kenji Ekuan and Kiyoshi Awazu. Kurokawa was selected because he had recently returned from an international student conference in the Soviet Union and was a student of the Marxist architectural theorist Uzō Nishiyama. Ekuan was asked because of his recent participation in a seminar given by Konrad Wachsmann (he arrived at the lecture on a YA-1 motorbike that he had newly designed for Yamaha) and Otaka was a junior associate of Kunio Maekawa and had just completed the Harumi Apartment Building in Tokyo Bay. Fumihiko Maki, a former undergraduate student of Tange also joined the group whilst in Tokyo on a travelling fellowship from the Graham Foundation.

By day Asada canvassed politicians, business leaders and journalists for ideas, by night he met with his young friends to cultivate ideas. Asada was staying at the Ryugetsu Ryokan in Asakusa, Tokyo and he used it as a meeting place for progressive scholars, architects and artists. He often invited people from other professions to give talks and one of these was the atomic physicist, Mitsuo Taketani. Taketani was a scholar who was also interested in Marxist theory and he brought this along with his scientific theories to the group. Taketani's three stage methodology for scientific research influenced Kikutake's own three stage theory: ka (the general system), kata (the abstract image) and katachi (the solution as built), which he used to summarise his own design process from a broad vision to a concrete architectural form.

The group also searched for architectural solutions to Japan's phenomenal urban expansion brought about by its economic growth and how this could be reconciled with its shortage of usable land. They were inspired by examples of circular growth and renewal found in traditional Japanese architecture like the Ise Shrine and Katsura Detached Palace. They worked in coffee shops and Tokyo's International House to produce a compilation of their works that they could publish as a manifesto for the conference.

The conference ran from 11 to 16 May 1960 and had 227 guests, 84 of whom were international, including the architects Louis Kahn, Ralph Erskine, B. V. Doshi, Jean Prouvé, Paul Rudolph and Peter and Alison Smithson. Japanese participants included Kunio Maekawa, Yoshinobu Ashihara and Kazuo Shinohara.

After his 13 May lecture, Louis Kahn was invited to Kikutake's Sky House and had a long conversation with a number of Japanese architects including the Metabolists. He answered questions until after midnight with Maki acting as translator. Kahn spoke of his universal approach to design and used his own Richards Medical Research Laboratories as an example of how new design solutions can be reached with new thinking about space and movement. A number of the Metabolists were inspired by this.

=== Name ===
Marine City sketch by Kikutake, 1958

Whilst discussing the organic nature of Kikutake's theoretical Marine City project, Kawazoe used the Japanese word shinchintaisha as being symbolic of the essential exchange of materials and energy between organisms and the exterior world (literally metabolism in a biological sense.) The Japanese meaning of the word has a feeling of replacement of the old with the new and the group further interpreted this to be equivalent to the continuous renewal and organic growth of the city. As the conference was to be a world conference, Kawazoe felt that they should use a more universal word and Kikutake looked up the definition of shinchintaisha in his Japanese-English dictionary. The translation he found was the word Metabolism.

== Manifesto ==
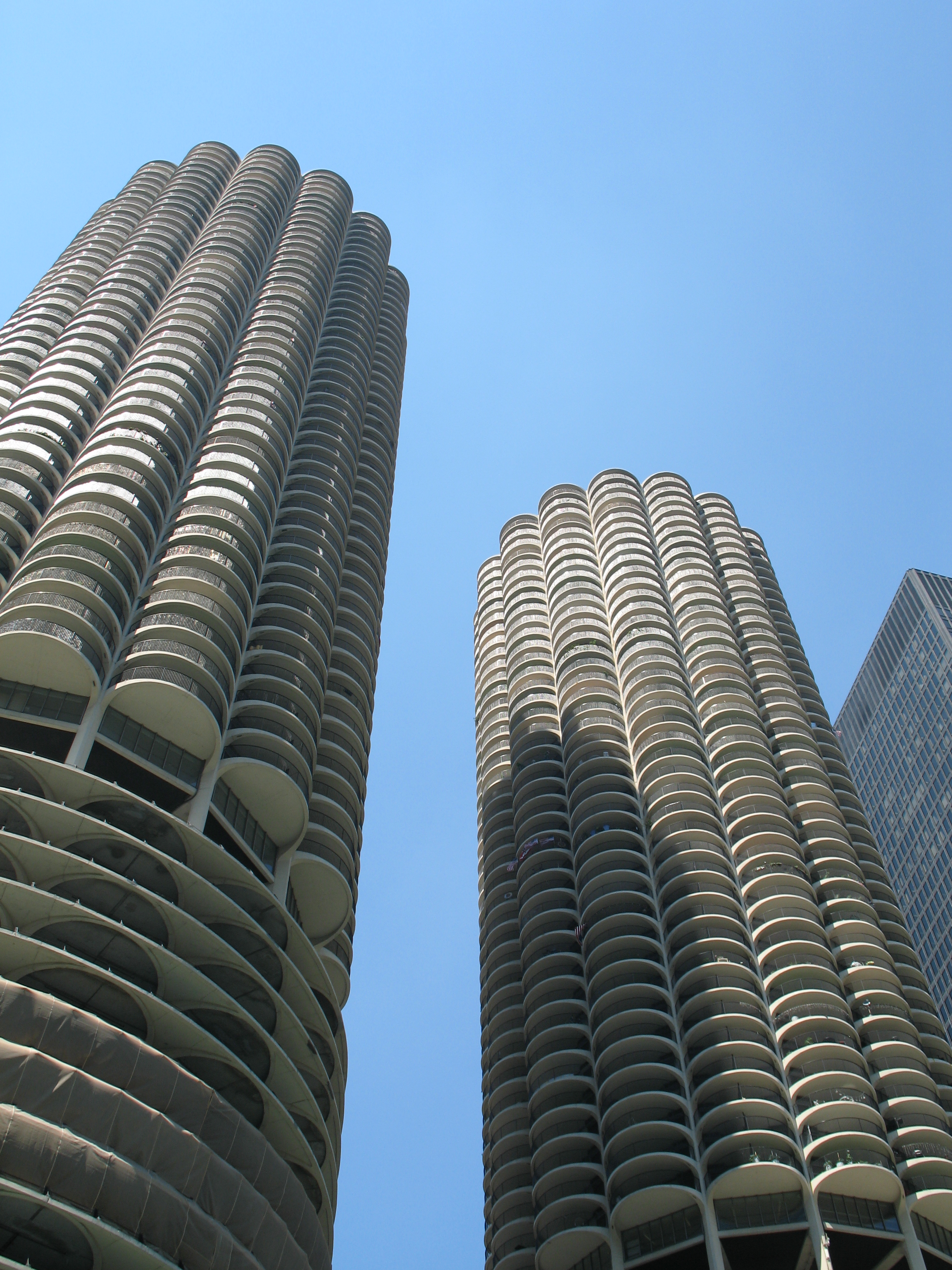
Kikutake used a photo of Marina City to illustrate the idea of capsules plugged onto a central tower.

The group's manifesto, Metabolism: The Proposals for New Urbanism, was published at the World Design Conference. Two thousand copies of the 90 page book were printed and were sold for ¥500 by Kurokawa and Awazu at the entrance to the venue. The manifesto opened with the following statement:

Metabolism is the name of the group, in which each member proposes further designs of our coming world through his concrete designs and illustrations. We regard human society as a vital process—a continuous development from atom to nebula. The reason why we use such a biological word, metabolism, is that we believe design and technology should be a denotation of human society. We are not going to accept metabolism as a natural process, but try to encourage active metabolic development of our society through our proposals.

The publication included projects by each member but a third of the document was dedicated to work by Kikutake who contributed essays and illustrations on the "Ocean City". Kurokawa contributed "Space City", Kawazoe contributed "Material and Man" and Otaka and Maki wrote "Towards the Group Form". Awazu designed the booklet and Kawazoe's wife, Yasuko, edited the layout.

Some of the projects included in the manifesto were subsequently displayed at the Museum of Modern Art's 1960 exhibition entitled Visionary Architecture and exposed the Japanese architects' work to a much wider international audience.

Unlike the more rigid membership structure of Team 10, the Metabolists saw their movement as having organic form with the members being free to come and go. Although the group had cohesion they saw themselves as individuals and their architecture reflected this. This was especially true for Tange who remained a mentor for the group rather than an "official" member.

=== Ocean City ===
Kikutake's Ocean City is the first essay in the pamphlet. It covered his two previously published projects "Tower-shaped City" and "Marine City" and included a new project "Ocean City" that was a combination of the first two. The first two of these projects introduced the Metabolist's idea of "artificial land" as well as "major" and "minor" structure. Kawazoe referred to "artificial land" in an article in the magazine Kindai Kenchiku in April 1960. In responding to the scarcity of land in large and expanding cities he proposed creating "artificial land" that would be composed of concrete slabs, oceans or walls (onto which capsules could be plugged). He said that the creation of this "artificial land" would allow people to use other land in a more natural way.

For Marine City, Kikutake proposed a city that would float free in the ocean and would be free of ties to a particular nation and therefore free from the threat of war. The artificial ground of the city would house agriculture, industry and entertainment and the residential towers would descend into the ocean to a depth of 200 metres. The city itself was not tied to the land and was free to float across the ocean and grow organically like an organism. Once it became too aged for habitation it would sink itself.

Ocean City was a combination of both Tower-shaped City and Marine City. It consisted of two rings that were tangent to one another, with housing on the inner ring and production on the outer one. Administrative buildings were found at the tangent point. The population would have been rigidly controlled at an upper limit of 500,000. Kikutake envisaged that the city would expand by multiplying itself as though it was undergoing cell division. This enforced the Metabolist idea that the expansion of cities could be a biological process.

=== Space City ===
In his essay "Space City", Kurokawa introduced four projects: Neo-Tokyo Plan, Wall City, Agricultural City and Mushroom-shaped house. In contrast to Tange's linear Tokyo City Bay Project, Kurokawa's Neo-Tokyo Plan proposed that Tokyo be decentralised and organised into cruciform patterns. He arranged Bamboo-shaped Cities along these cruciforms but unlike Kikutake he kept the city towers lower than 31 metres to conform with Tokyo's building code (these height limits were not revised until 1968).

The Wall City considered the problem of the ever-expanding distance between the home and the workplace. He proposed a wall-shaped city that could extend indefinitely. Dwellings would be on one side of the wall and workplaces on the other. The wall itself would contain transportation and services.

Surviving the Ise Bay Typhoon in 1959 inspired Kurokawa to design the Agricultural City. It consisted of a grid-like city supported on 4-metre (13 ft) stilts above the ground. The 500 metres square city sat on concrete slab that placed industry and infrastructure above agriculture and was an attempt to combine rural land and the city into one entity. He envisaged that his Mushroom Houses would sprout through the slab of Agriculture City. These houses were shrouded in a mushroom-like cap that was neither wall nor roof that enclosed a tea room and a living space.

=== Towards the Group Form ===
Maki and Otaka's essay on Group Form placed less emphasis on the megastructures of some of the other Metabolists and focused instead on a more flexible form of urban planning that could better accommodate rapid and unpredictable requirements of the city.

Otaka had first thought about the relationship between infrastructure and architecture in his 1949 graduation thesis and he continued to explore ideas about "artificial ground" during his work at Maekawa's office. Likewise, during his travels abroad, Maki was impressed with the grouping and forms of vernacular buildings. The project they included to illustrate their ideas was a scheme for the redevelopment of Shinjuku station which included retail, offices and entertainment on an artificial ground over the station. Although Otaka's forms were heavy and sculptural and Maki's were lightweight with large spans, both contained the homogeneous clusters that were associated with group form.

=== Material and Man ===
Kawazoe contributed a brief essay entitled "I want to be a sea-shell, I want to be a mold, I want to be a spirit". The essay reflected Japan's cultural anguish after the Second World War and proposed the unity of man and nature.

== Plan for Tokyo, 1960–2025 ==
Tokyo Bay Plan, project of the Metabolist and Structuralist movement, 1960 (Kenzo Tange)

On 1 January 1961 Kenzo Tange presented his new plan for Tokyo Bay (1960) in a 45-minute television programme on NHK General TV. The design was a radical plan for the reorganization and expansion of the capital in order to cater for a population beyond 10 million. The design was for a linear city that used a series of nine-kilometre modules that stretched 80 km across Tokyo Bay from Ikebukuro in the north west to Kisarazu in the south east. The perimeter of each of the modules was organised into three levels of looping highways, as Tange was adamant that an efficient communication system would be the key to modern living. The modules themselves were organised into building zones and transport hubs and included office, government administration and retail districts as well as a new Tokyo train station and highway links to other parts of Tokyo. Residential areas were to be accommodated on parallel streets that ran perpendicular to the main linear axis and people would build their own houses within giant A-frame structures.

The project was designed by Tange and other members of his studio at Tokyo University, including Kurokawa and Arata Isozaki. Originally it was intended to publish the plan at the World Design Conference (hence its "1960" title) but it was delayed because the same members were working on the Conference organisation. Tange received interest and support from a number of government agencies but the project was never built. Tange went on to expand the idea of the linear city in 1964 with the Tōkaidō Megalopolis Plan. This was an ambitious proposal to extend Tokyo's linear city across the whole of the Tōkaidō region of Japan in order to re-distribute the population.

Both Kikutake and Kurokawa capitalised on the interest in Tange's 1960 plan by producing their own schemes for Tokyo. Kikutake's plan incorporated three elements both on the land and the sea and included a looped highway that connected all the prefectures around the bay. Unlike Tange however its simple presentation graphics put many people off. Kurokawa's plan consisted of helix-shaped megastructures floating inside cells that extended out across the bay. Although the scheme's more convincing graphics were presented as part of a film the project was not built.

With Japan's property boom in the 1980s, both Tange and Kurokawa revisited their earlier ideas: Tange with his Tokyo Plan 1986 and Kurokawa with his New Tokyo Plan 2025. Both projects used land that had been reclaimed from the sea since the 1960s in combination with floating structures.

== Plan for Skopje ==
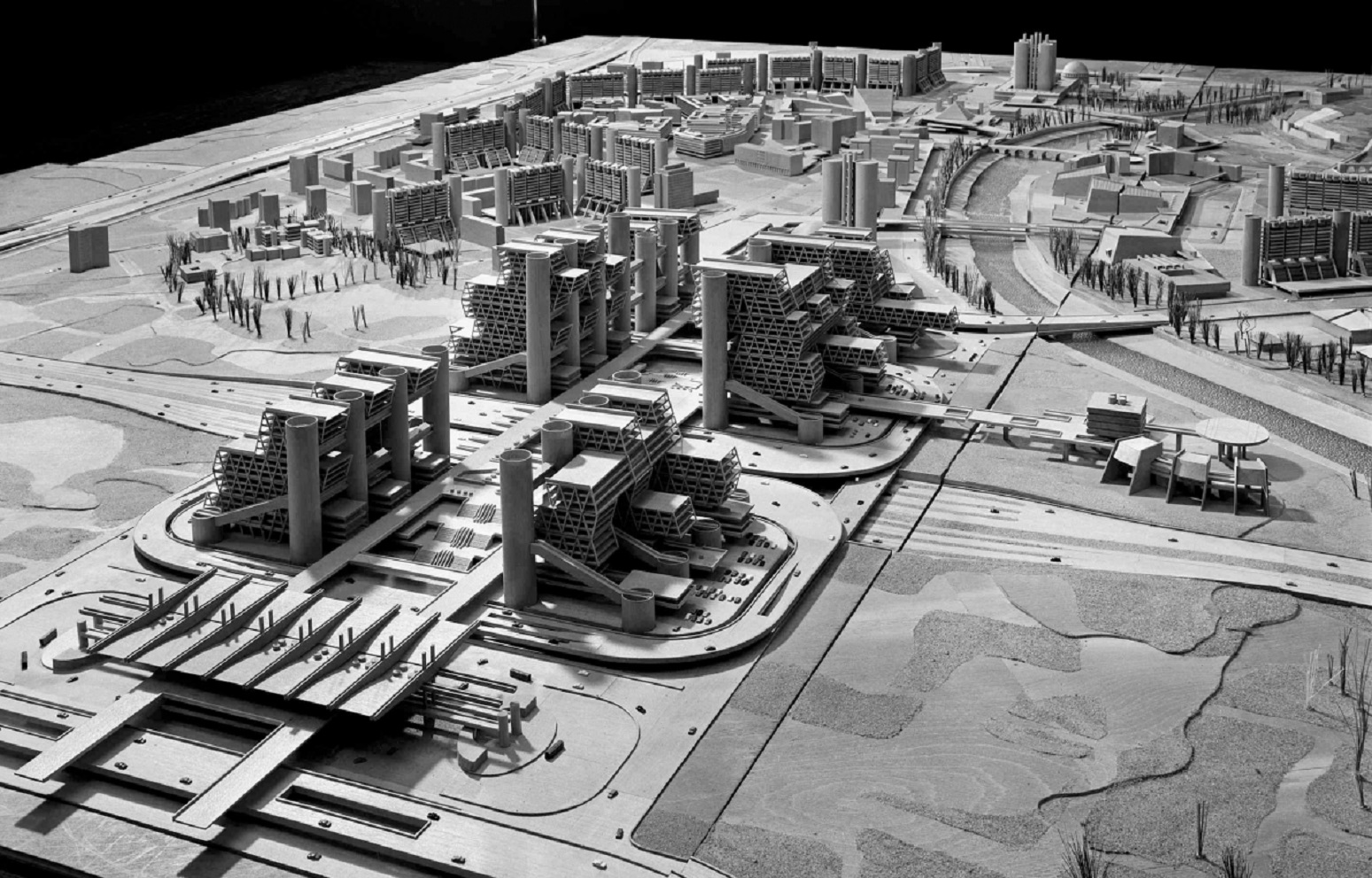
Urban master plan of Skopje 1963

The reconstruction plan of the capital city of Skopje then part of the Yugoslav Republic of Macedonia (now North Macedonia) following a major earthquake was won by Tange's team. The project was significant because of its international influence as well as an international model case for urban reconstruction. It is a major breakthrough for the Metabolist movement to realise their approach on an international scale.

== Selected built projects ==
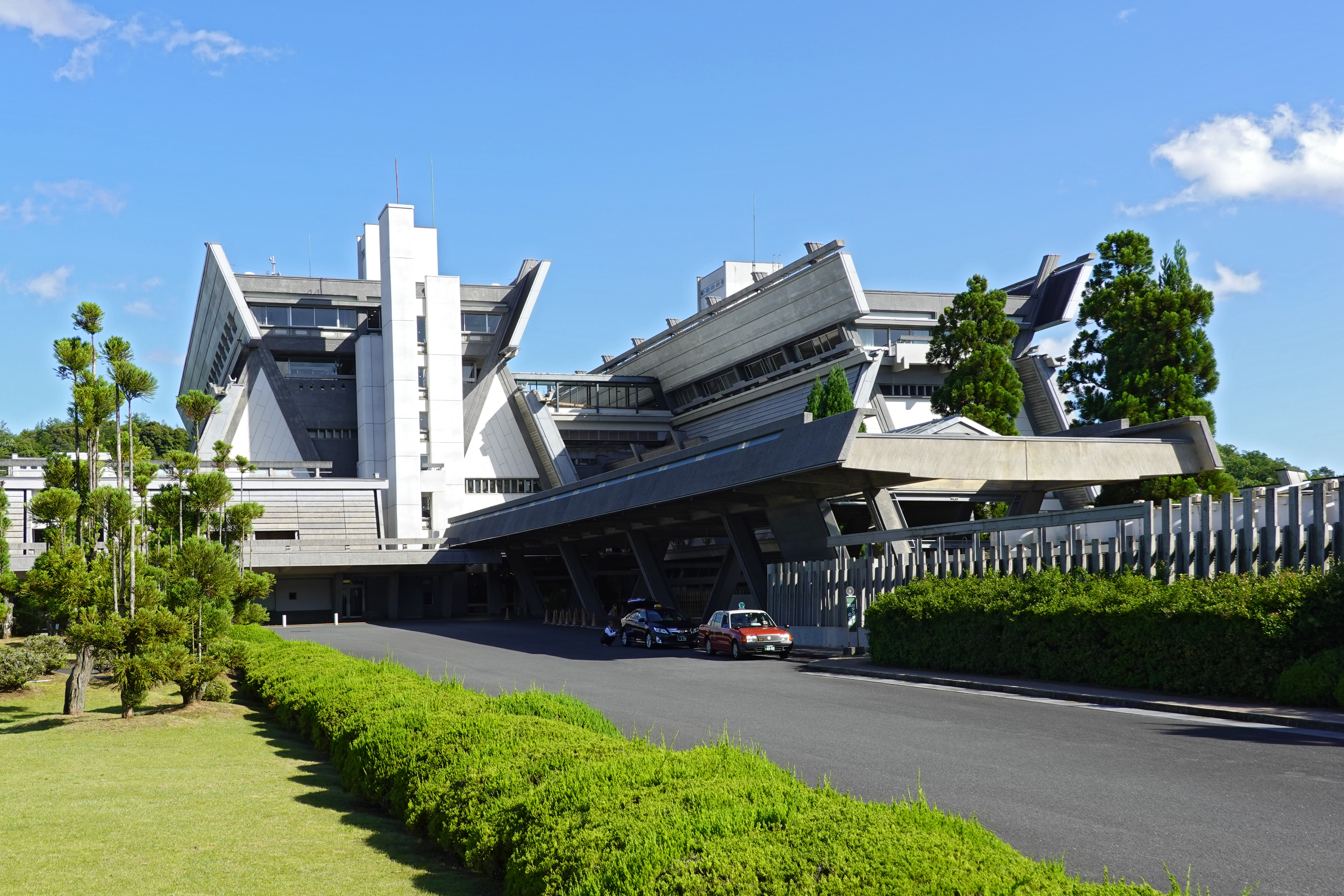
The Kyoto International Conference Center

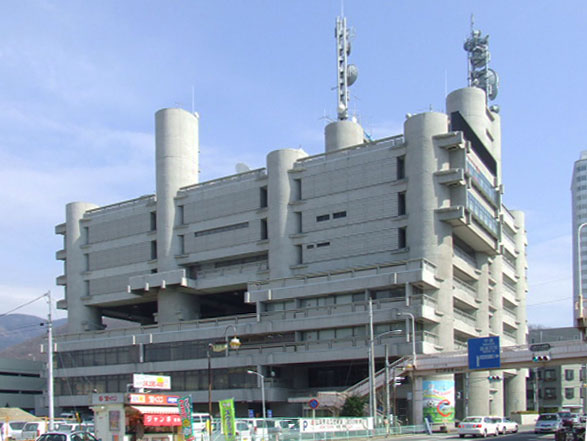
The Yamanashi Press and Broadcaster Centre

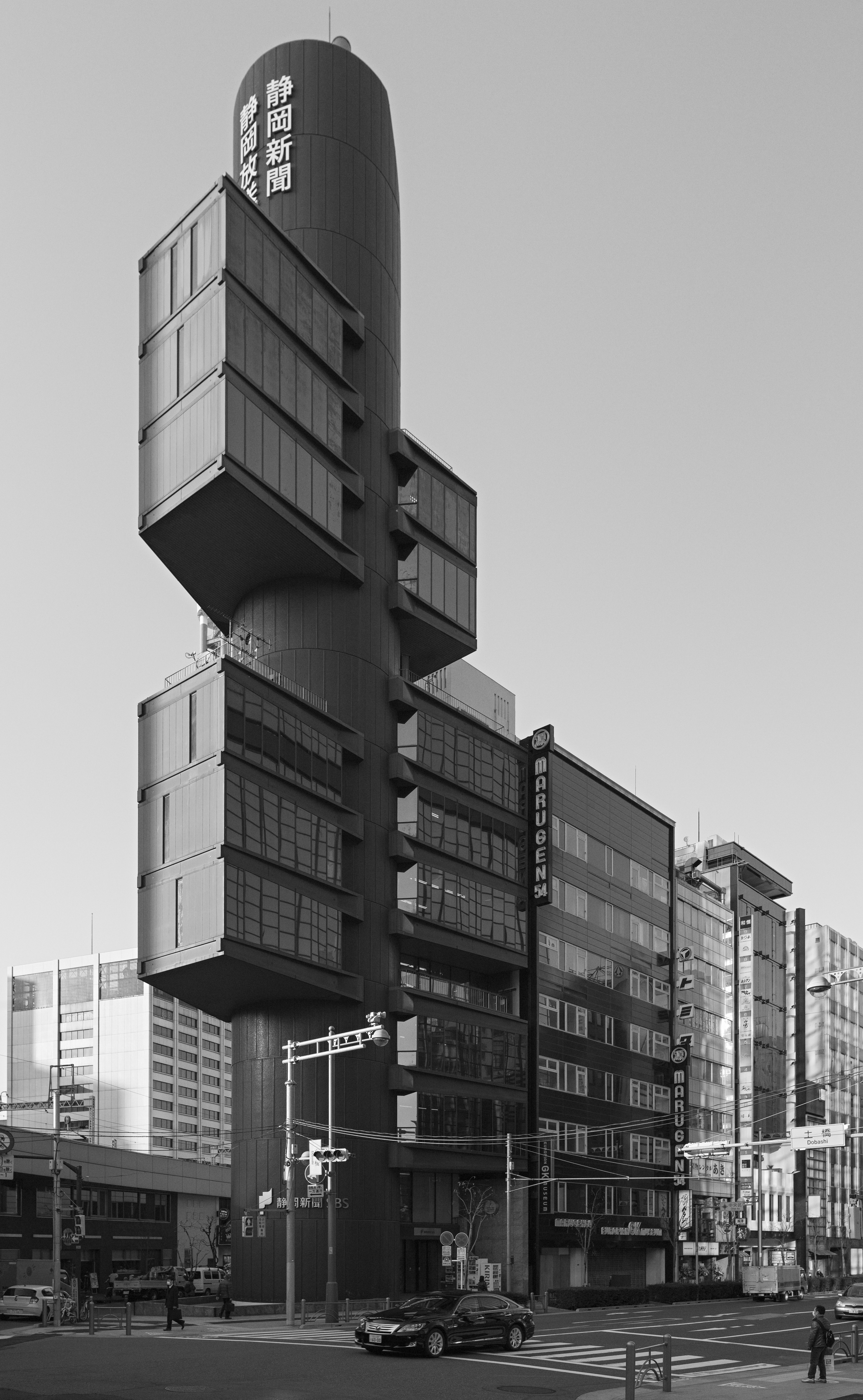
Shizuoka Press and Broadcasting Tower

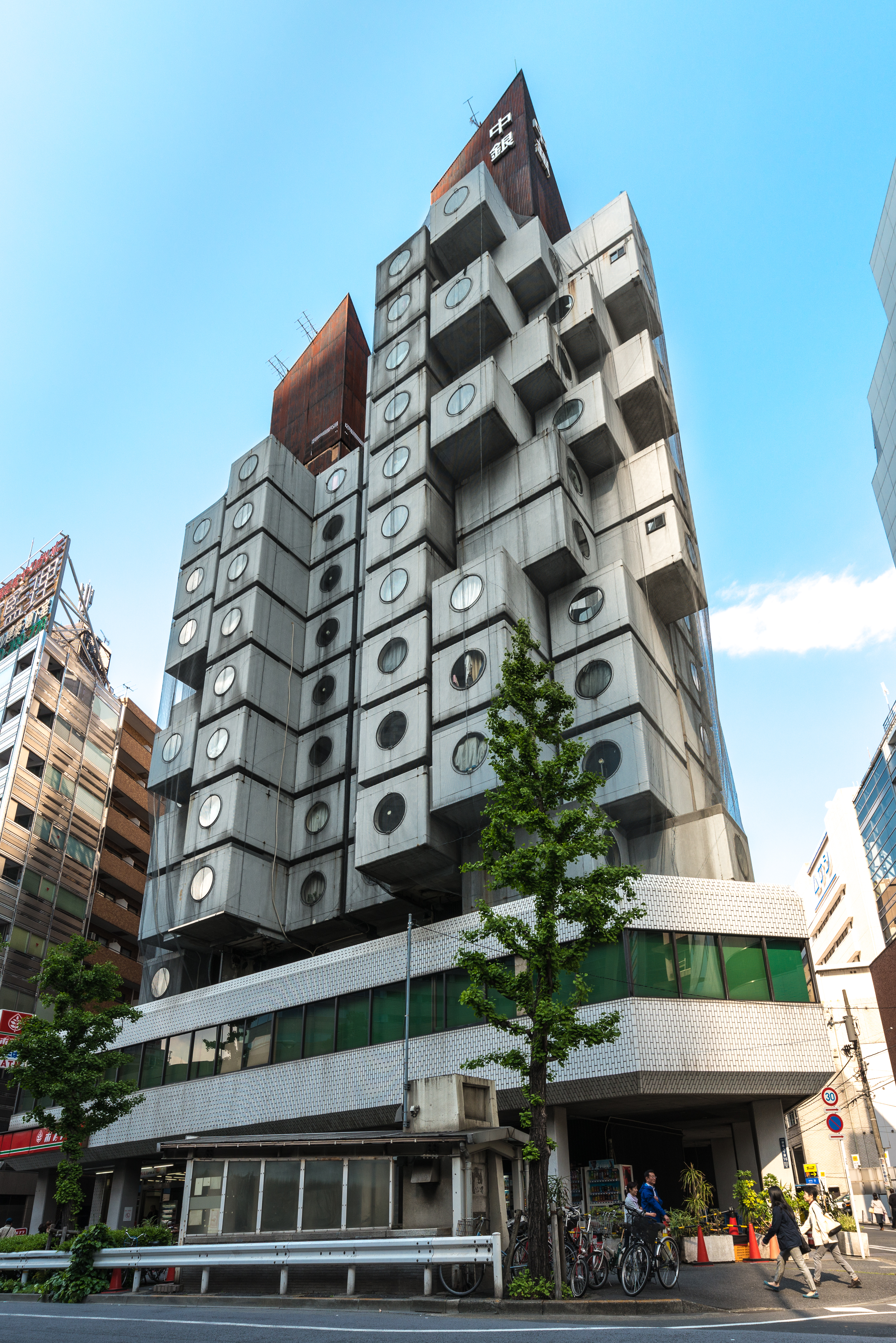
Nakagin Capsule Tower

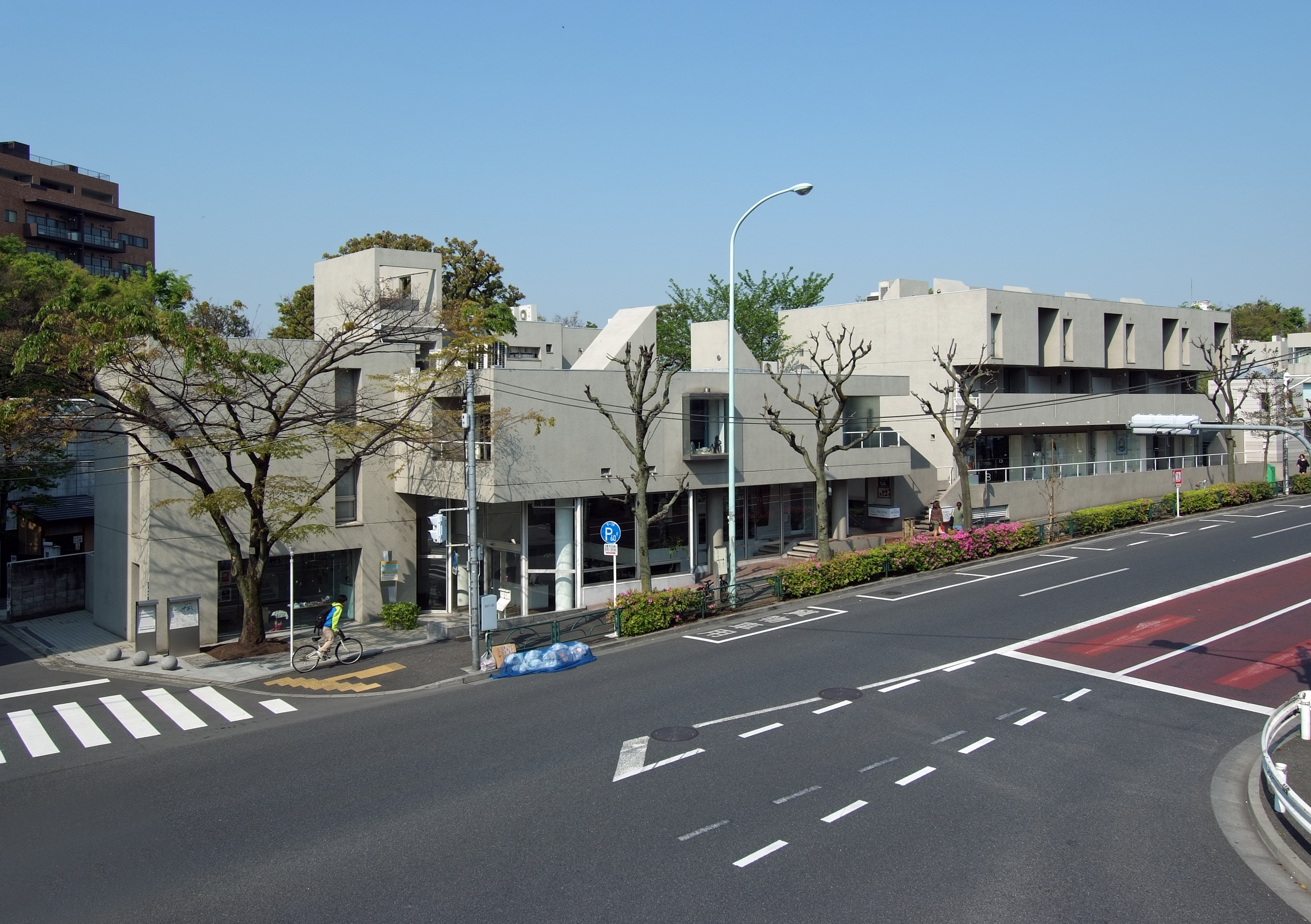
Hillside Terrace

=== Yamanashi Press and Broadcaster Centre ===
In 1961 Kenzo Tange received a commission from the Yamanashi News Group to design a new office in Kōfu. As well as two news firms and a printing company the building needed to incorporate a cafeteria and shops at ground floor level to interface with the adjoining city. It also needed to be flexible in its design to allow future expansion.

Tange organised the spaces of the three firms by function to allow them to share common facilities. He stacked these functions vertically according to need, for example, the printing plant is on the ground floor to facilitate access to the street for loading and transportation. He then took all the service functions including elevators, toilets and pipes and grouped them into 16 reinforced concrete cylindrical towers, each with an equal 5-metre (16 ft) diameter. These he placed on a grid into which he inserted the functional group facilities and offices. These inserted elements were conceived of as containers that were independent of the structure and could be arranged flexibly as required. This conceived flexibility distinguished Tange's design from other architects' designs with open floor offices and service cores – such as Kahn's Richards Medical Research Laboratories. Tange deliberately finished the cylindrical towers at different heights to imply that there was room for vertical expansion.

Although the building was expanded in 1974 as Tange had originally envisioned, it did not act as a catalyst for the expansion of the building into a megastructure across the rest of the city. The building was criticised for forsaking the human use of the building in preference to the structure and adaptability.

=== Shizuoka Press and Broadcasting Tower ===
In 1966 Tange designed the Shizuoka Press and Broadcasting Tower in the Ginza district of Tokyo. This time using only a single core Tange arranged the offices as cantilevered steel and glass boxes. The cantilever is emphasised by punctuating the three-storey blocks with a single-storey glazed balcony. The concrete forms of the building were cast using aluminium formwork and the aluminium has been left on as a cladding. Although conceived as a "core-type" system that was included in Tange's other city proposals, the tower stands alone and is robbed of other connections.

=== Nakagin Capsule Tower ===
The icon of Metabolism, Kurokawa's Nakagin Capsule Tower was erected in the Ginza district of Tokyo in 1972 and completed in just 30 days. Prefabricated in Shiga Prefecture in a factory that normally built shipping containers, it is constructed of 140 capsules plugged into two cores that are 11 and 13 stories in height. The capsules contained the latest gadgets of the day and were built to house small offices and pieds-à-terre for Tokyo salarymen.

The capsules were constructed of light steel welded trusses covered with steel sheeting mounted onto the reinforced concrete cores. The capsules were 2.5 metres wide and four metres long with a 1.3-metre-diameter (4.3 ft) window at one end. The units originally contained a bed, storage cabinets, a bathroom, a colour television set, clock, refrigerator and air conditioner, although optional extras such as a stereo were available. Although the capsules were designed with mass production in mind, there was never a demand for them. Nobuo Abe was a senior manager, managing one of the design divisions on the construction of the Nakagin Capsule Tower.

Since 1996, the tower was listed as an architectural heritage by DoCoMoMo. However, in 2007 the residents voted to tear the tower down and build a new 14-story tower. In 2010, some of the remaining habitable pods were converted for use as budget hotel rooms. As of 2017, many capsules had been renovated and were being used as residential and office spaces, while short-stay renting such as Airbnb or other lodging provisions had been banned by the administration of the building. The tower was demolished in April 2022.

=== Hillside Terrace, Tokyo ===
After the World Design Conference Maki began to distance himself from Metabolist movement, although his studies in Group Form continued to be of interest to the Metabolists. In 1964 he published a booklet entitled Investigations in Collective Form in which he investigated three urban forms: Compositional-form, Megastructure and Group Form. The Hillside Terrace is a series of projects commissioned by the Asakura family and undertaken in seven phases from 1967 to 1992. It includes residential, office and cultural buildings as well as the Royal Danish Embassy and is situated on both sides of Kyū-Yamate avenue in the Daikanyama district of Tokyo.

The execution of the designs evolves through the phases with exterior forms becoming more independent of the interior functions and new materials being employed. For example, the first phase has a raised pedestrian deck that gives access to shops and a restaurant and this was designed to be extended in subsequent phases but the idea, along with the original master plan, was discarded in later phases. By the third phase Maki moved away from the Modernist maxim of form follows function and started to design the building exteriors to better match the immediate environment. The project acted as a catalyst to the redevelopment of the whole area around Daikanyama Station.

== In context ==
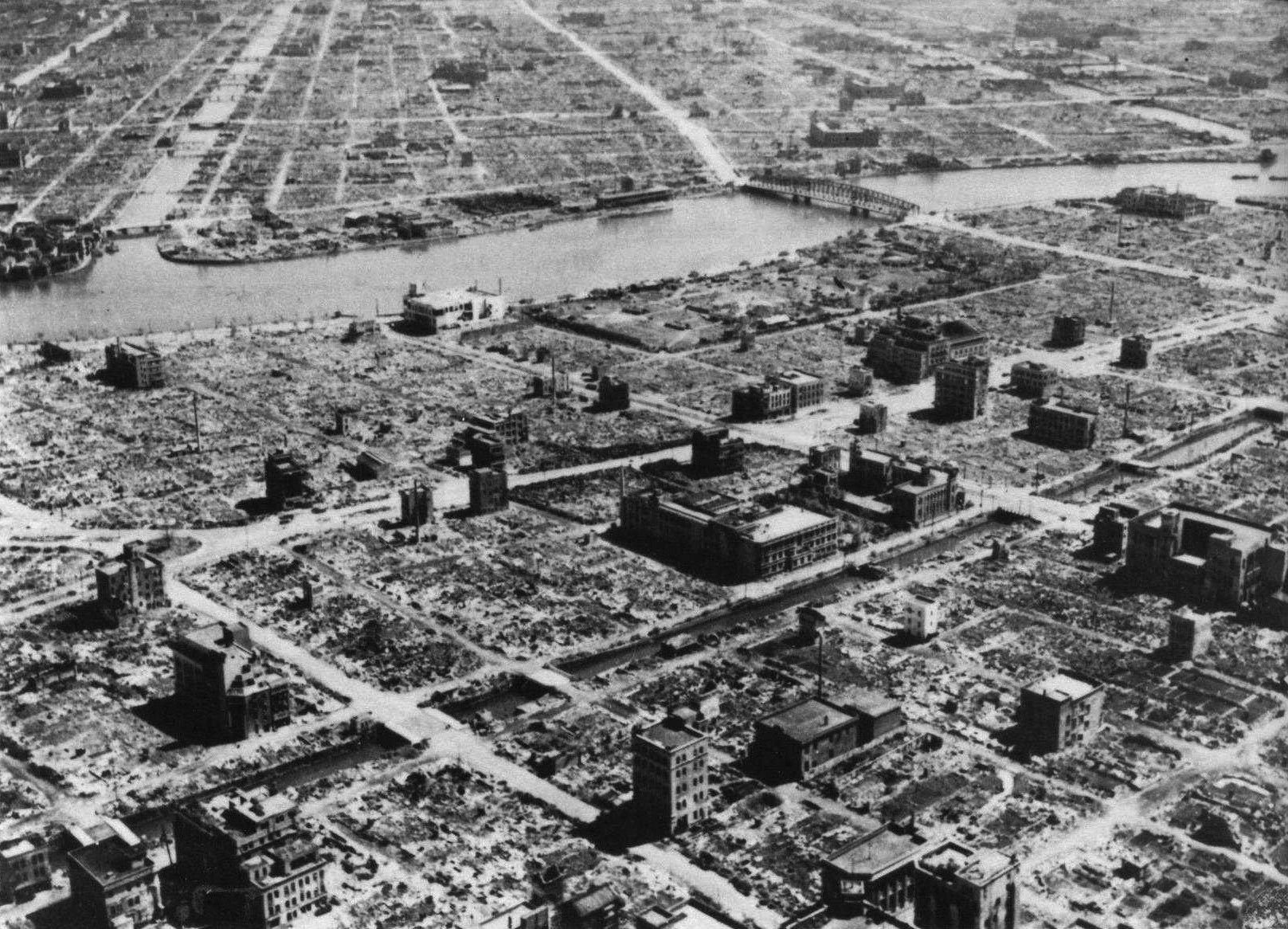
Tokyo after bombing, 1945

Metabolism developed during the post war period in a Japan that questioned its cultural identity. Initially the group had chosen the name Burnt Ash School to reflect the ruined state of firebombed Japanese cities and the opportunity they presented for radical re-building. Ideas of nuclear physics and biological growth were linked with Buddhist concepts of regeneration. Although Metabolism rejected visual references from the past, they embraced concepts of prefabrication and renewal from traditional Japanese architecture, especially the twenty-year cycle of the rebuilding of the Ise Shrine (to which Tange and Kawazoe were invited in 1953). The sacred rocks onto which the shrine is built were seen by the Metabolists as symbolising a Japanese spirit that predated Imperial aspirations and modernising influences from the West.

In his Investigations in Collective Form Maki coined the term Megastructure to refer structures that house the whole or part of a city in a single structure. He originated the idea from vernacular forms of village architecture that were projected into vast structures with the aid of modern technology. Reyner Banham borrowed Megastructure for the title of his 1976 book which contained numerous built and unbuilt projects. He defined megastructures as modular units (with a short life span) that attached to structural framework (with a longer life span). Maki would later criticise the Megastructure approach to design advocating instead his idea of Group Form which he thought would better accommodate the disorder of the city.

The architect Robin Boyd readily interchanges the word Metabolism with Archigram in his 1968 book New Directions in Japanese Architecture. Indeed, the two groups both emerged in the 1960s and disbanded in the 1970s and used imagery with megastructures and cells, but their urban and architectural proposals were quite different. Although utopian in their ideals, the Metabolists were concerned with improving the social structure of society with their biologically inspired architecture, whereas Archigram were influenced by mechanics, information and electronic media and their architecture was more utopian and less social.

== Osaka Expo, 1970 ==
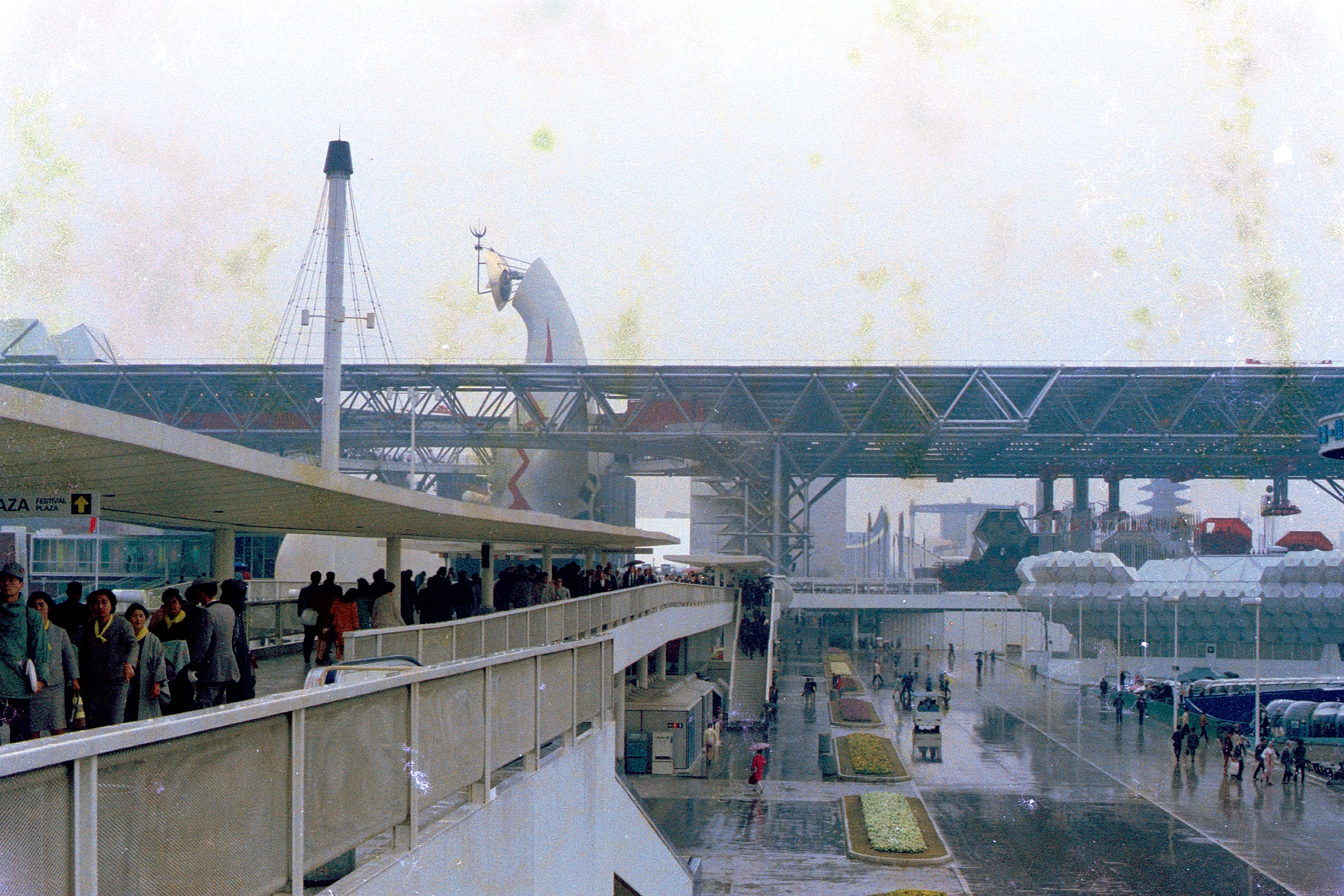
The roof of the Festival Plaza, Osaka Expo 1970

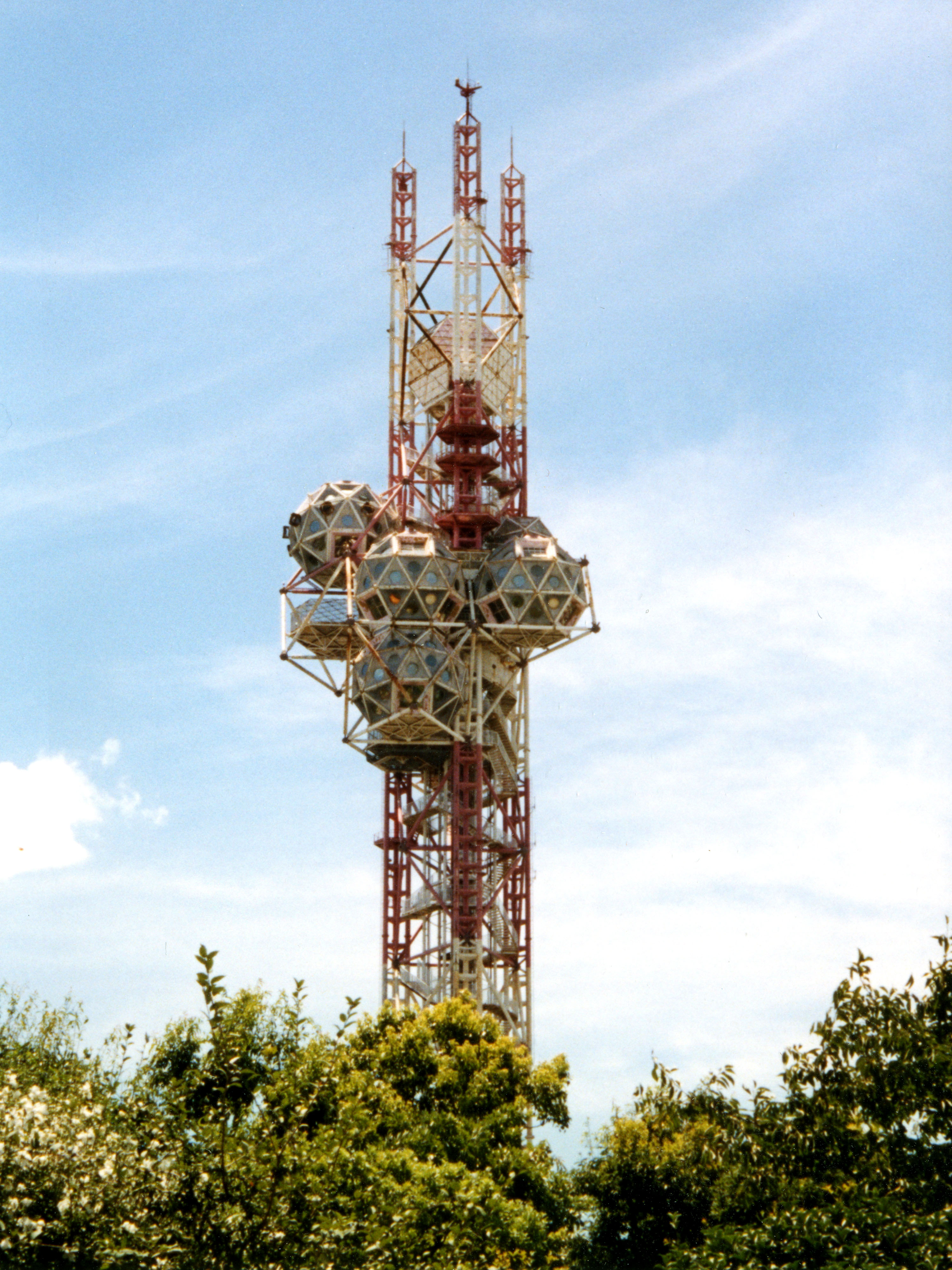
Kikutake's Expo Tower, Osaka Expo 1970

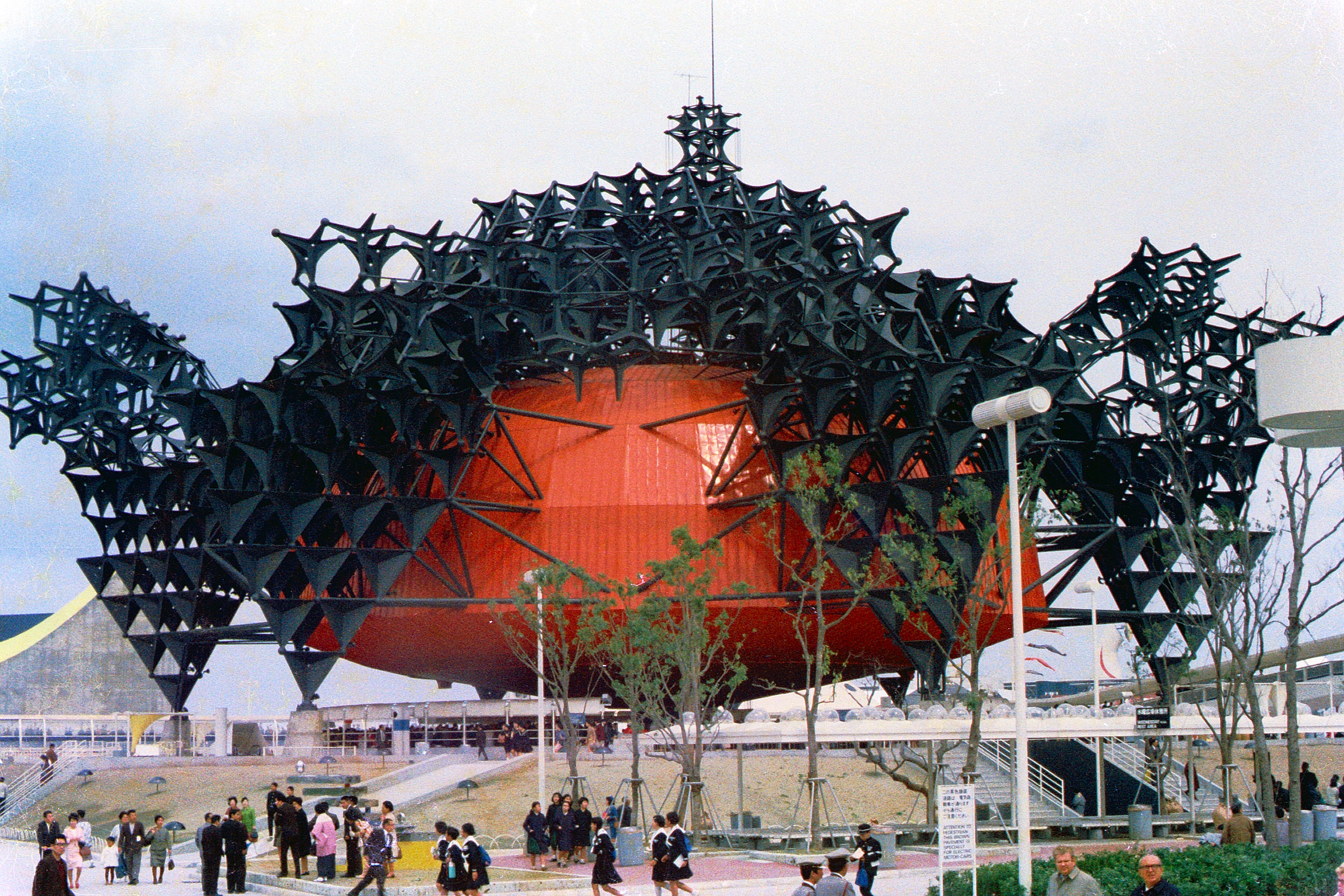
Kurokawa's Toshiba-IHI Pavilion, Osaka Expo 1970

Japan was selected as the site for the 1970 World Exposition and 330 hectares in the Senri Hills in Osaka Prefecture were set aside as the location. Japan had originally wanted to host a World Exposition in 1940 but it was cancelled with the escalation of the war. The one million people who had bought tickets for 1940 were allowed to use them in 1970.

Kenzo Tange joined the Theme Committee for the Expo and along with Uso Nishiyama he had responsibility for master planning the site. The theme for the Expo became "Progress and Harmony for Mankind". Tange invited twelve architects, including Arata Isozaki, Otaka and Kikutake to design individual elements. He also asked Ekuan to oversee the design of the furniture and transportation and Kawazoe to curate the Mid-Air Exhibition which was sited in the huge space-frame roof.

Tange envisioned that the Expo should be primarily conceived as a big festival where human beings could meet. Central to the site he placed the Festival Plaza onto which were connected a number of themed displays, all of which were united under one huge roof. In his Tokyo Bay Project Tange spoke about the living body having two types of information transmission systems: fluid and electronic. That project used the idea of a tree trunk and branches that would carry out those types of transmission in relation to the city. Kawazoe likened the space frame roof of the Festival Plaza to the electronic transmission system and the aerial-themed displays that plugged into it to the hormonal system.

Kawazoe, Maki and Kurokawa had invited a selection of world architects to design displays for the Mid-Air Exhibition that was to be incorporated within the roof. The architects included Moshe Safdie, Yona Friedman, Hans Hollein and Giancarlo De Carlo. Although Tange was obsessed with the theory of flexibility that the space framed provide he did concede that in reality it was not so practical for the actual fixing of the displays. The roof itself was designed by Koji Kamaya and Mamoru Kawaguchi who conceived it as a huge space frame. Kawaguchi invented a welding-free ball joint to safely distribute the load and worked out a method of assembling the frame on the ground before raising it using jacks.

Kikutake's Expo Tower was situated on the highest hill in the grounds and acted as a landmark for visitors. It was built of a vertical ball and joint space onto which was attached a series of cabins. The design was to have been a blueprint for flexible vertical living based upon a 360m3 standard construction cabin clad with a membrane of cast aluminium and glass that could be flexibly arranged anywhere on the tower. This was demonstrated with a variety of cabins that were observation platforms and VIP rooms and one cabin at ground level that became an information booth.

Kurokawa had won commissions for two corporate pavilions: the Takara Beautillion and the Toshiba IHI pavilion. The former of these was composed of capsules plugged onto six point frames and was assembled in just six days; the latter was a space frame composed of tetrahedron modules, based upon his Helix City that could grow in 14 different directions and resemble organic growth.

Expo '70 has been described has the apotheosis of the Metabolist movement. But even before Japan's period of rapid economic growth ended with the world energy crisis, critics were calling the Expo a dystopia that was removed from reality. The energy crisis demonstrated Japan's reliance both on imported oil and led to a re-evaluation of design and planning with architects moving away from utopian projects towards smaller urban interventions.

== Later years ==
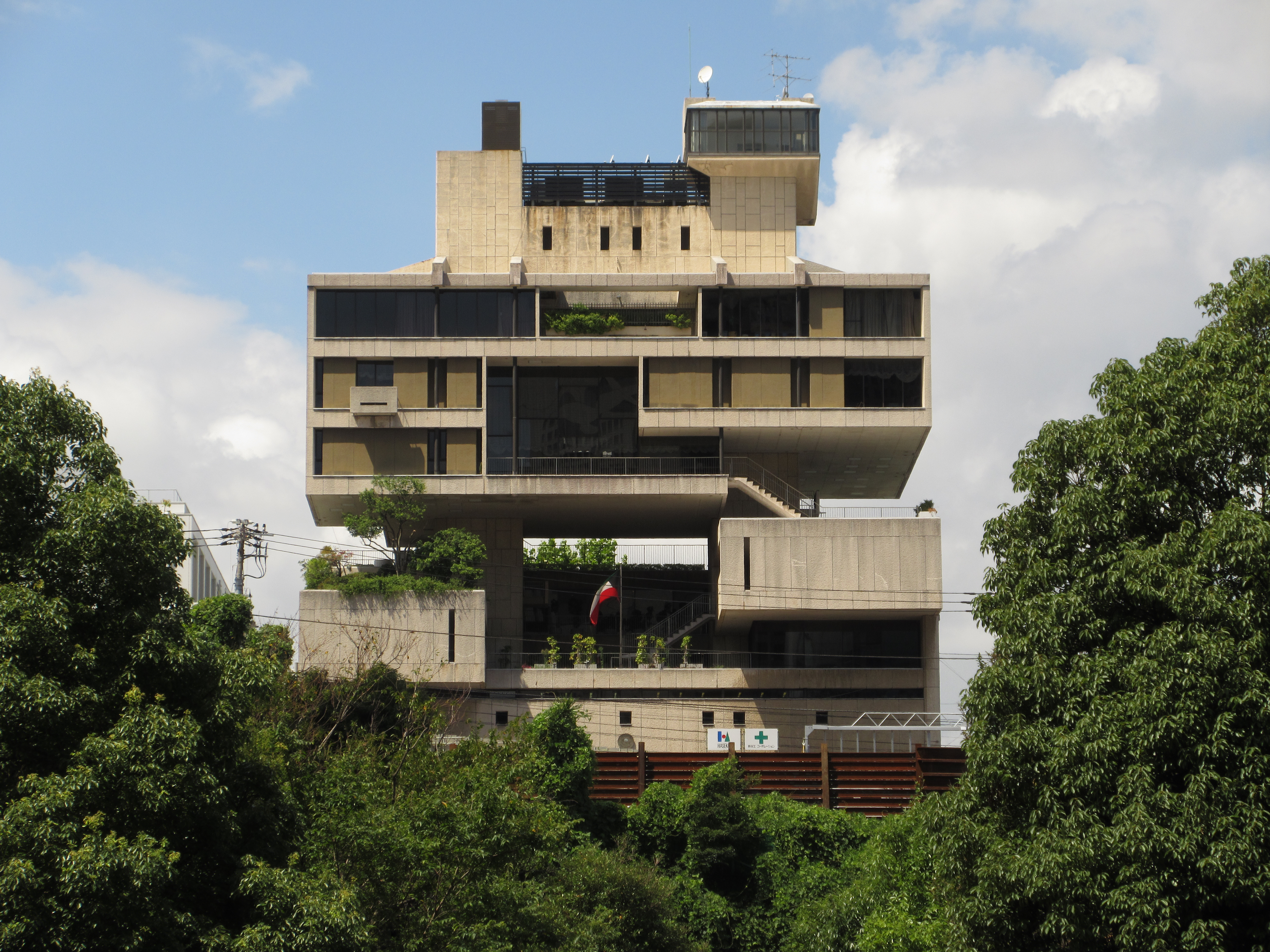
Kuwait Embassy and Chancellery of Japan (1970)

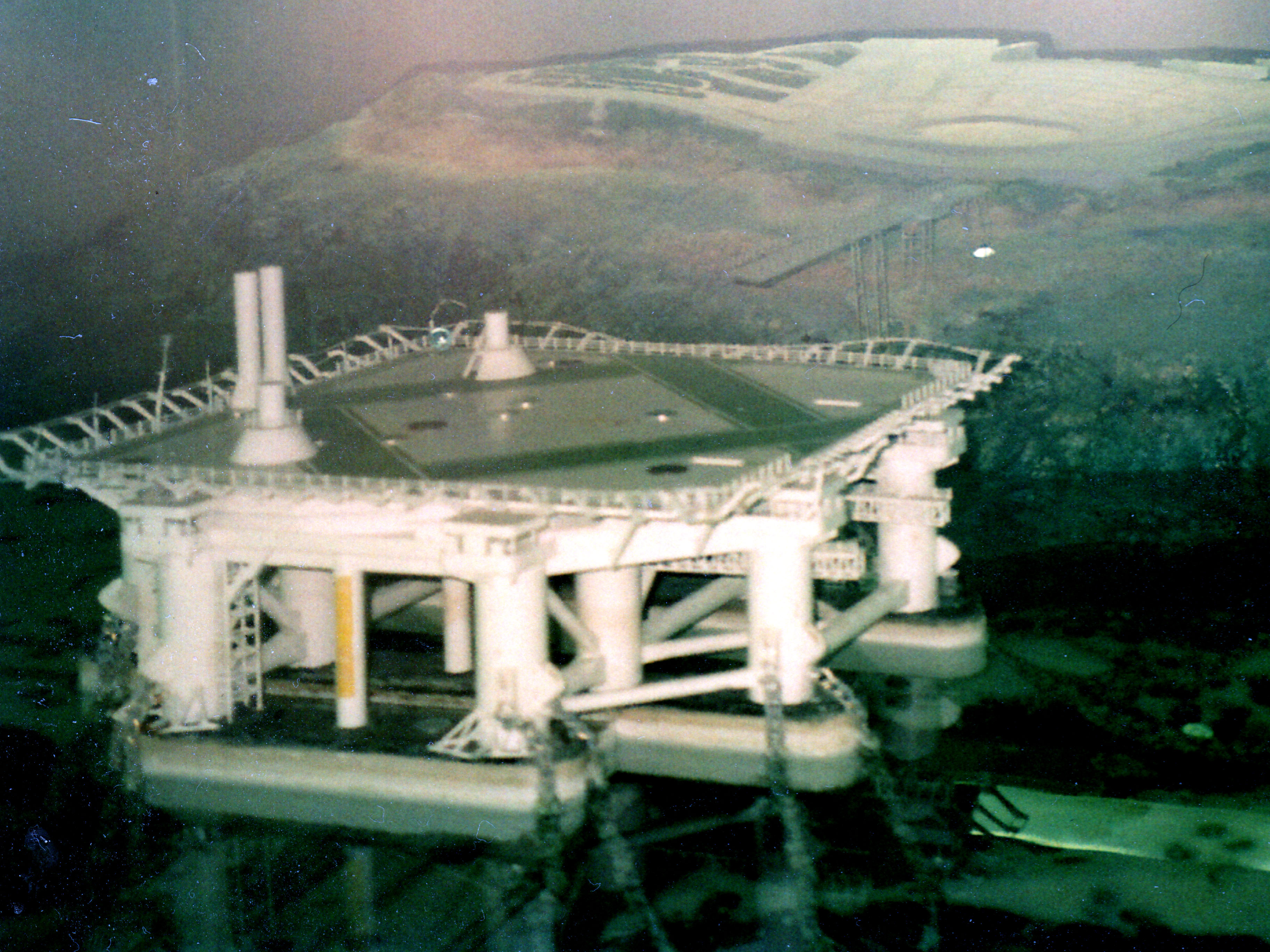
Model of the Aquapolis, Okinawa Ocean Expo 1975

After the 1970 Expo, Tange and the Metabolists turned their attention away from Japan towards the Middle East and Africa. These countries were expanding on the back of income from oil and were fascinated by both Japanese culture and the expertise that the Metabolists brought to urban planning. Tange and Kurokawa capitalised on the majority of the commissions, but Kikutake and Maki were involved too.

Tange's projects included a 57,000-seat stadium and sports center in Riyadh for King Faisal, and a sports city for Kuwait for the planned 1974 Pan Arab Games. However, both were put on hold by the outbreak of the Fourth Arab–Israeli War in 1973. Likewise, the plan for a new city center in Tehran was cancelled after the 1979 revolution. He did however complete the Kuwaiti Embassy in Tokyo in 1970 and Kuwait's International Airport, as well as the Presidential Palace in Damascus, Syria.

Kurokawa's work included a competition win for Abu Dhabi's National Theatre (1977), capsule-tower designs for a hotel in Baghdad (1975) and a city in the desert in Libya (1979–1984).

Kikutake's vision for floating towers was partly realised in 1975 when he designed and built the Aquapolis for the Okinawa Ocean Expo. The 100 x 100 meter floating city block contained accommodation that included a banquet hall, offices and residences for 40 staff and it was built in Hiroshima and then towed to Okinawa. Further unbuilt floating city projects were undertaken, including a floating city in Hawaii for ocean research and a plug-in floating A-frame unit containing housing and offices that could have been used to provide mobile homes in the event of a natural disaster.
