= Yona Friedman =

Hungarian-born French architect (1923–2020)

- Born: 5 June 1923; Budapest, Hungary
- Died: 20 February 2020 (aged 96); Los Angeles, United States
- Education: Technion - Israel Institute of Technology Budapest University of Technology and Economics
- Occupation: Architect

Yona Friedman (5 June 1923 – 20 February 2020) was a Hungarian-born French architect, urban planner and designer. He was influential in the late 1950s and early 1960s, best known for his theory of "mobile architecture". In 2018, on his 95th birthday, he was awarded the Austrian Frederick Kiesler Prize for Architecture and the Arts.

== Early years ==
Born in Budapest, Hungary, in 1923, into an ethnic Jewish family, which posed him problems because of the anti-Semitic quota laws at universities, Friedman survived the Second World War by escaping the Nazi roundups of Jews, and he lived for about a decade in the city of Haifa in Israel before moving permanently to Paris in 1957. He became a French citizen in 1966.

In 1956, at the Xth International Congress of Modern Architecture in Dubrovnik, his "Manifeste de l'architecture mobile" contributed to question definitely the daring will planning to architectural design and urbanism. It was during that conference, and thanks especially to the youth of the Team 10, that "mobile architecture" was coined in the sense of "mobility of living." With the example of "Ville spatiale", Friedman set out – for the first time – the principles of an architecture capable of understanding the constant changes that characterize the "social mobility" and based on "infrastructure" that provide housing. Planning rules could be created and recreated, according to the need of the inhabitants and residents. Its focus on people themselves arises from its direct experience of homeless refugees, first in European cities facing war and disaster and later in Israel, where, in the early years of the State, thousands of people landed every day, with housing problems .

== Maturity ==
In 1958, Friedman founded the Groupe d'études de architecture mobile (GEAM) which dissolved in 1962. In 1963, he developed the idea of a city bridge and participated actively in the cultural climate and utopian architecture of the 1960s known as the "Age of megastructures". From the mid nineteen sixties on he taught at MIT, and Princeton, Harvard and Columbia universities. In the following decade he worked for the United Nations and UNESCO through the dissemination of self-building manuals in African countries, South America and India. Despite the perennial utopian label, Friedman said: "I have always tried, in architectural studies, to develop projects that were feasible." In 1978, he was commissioned to design the Lycée Bergson in Angers, France, completed in 1981. On this occasion he published a procedure in which the distribution and arrangement of all the architectural elements were designed and decided by future users. Because even non-professionals can understand and apply his method, he also wrote how-to comics. Interest in the issue of participation brought Friedman's work to the attention of architects like Giancarlo De Carlo and Bernard Rudofsky.

In 1987, in Madras, India, Friedman completed the Museum of Simple Technology in which the principles of self-construction from local materials such as bamboo were applied. He also authored books dealing with technical subjects (For a scientific architecture, Workshop 1975), sociological (L'architecture du survie, L'éclat 2003) and epistemological (L'univers erratique , PUF 1994). The book that best represents, however, Friedman's ethics and spirit is perhaps "Utopies Réalisables (French for feasible utopias), published in France in 1975 and also published in Italian (Quodlibet 2003) describing a project to restructure our society in a genuine democratic way, seeking to escape any elitism through the theory of the critical group. The book is also a fierce critique of the myth of global communication. From the book: "The analysis of social utopias presented in this book implies, implicitly in the act of accusation and criticism of these two 'plagues' of our times which are: 'the state mafia' and the 'media mafia' (press, television etc.). The existence of a state mafia results from the impossibility of the classic democratic state to keep the shape once its size exceeds certain limits, and the 'media mafia' is a direct result of the same inability in global communication ( Worldwide). The Internet can be used as an example of this inability, which is not the result of technical difficulties but rather stems from the fundamental human inability to communicate universally (from all to all). The failure of these two generous utopias, democracy and the 'global communication' between men, logically leads to the formation of gangs who act on our behalf against our interests. As well as an indictment, this book will simultaneously be an act of encouragement: the individual should be encouraged not to offer their help or their tacit consent to these two gangs. It is not a call for revolution, but a call to resistance. "

== Mobile architecture ==
In 1958, Yona Friedman published his first manifesto : "Mobile architecture". It describes a new kind of mobility not of the buildings, but for the inhabitants, who are given a new freedom.

Mobile architecture is the "dwelling decided on by the occupant" by way of "infrastructures that are neither determined nor determining". Mobile architecture embodies an architecture available for a "mobile society". To deal with it, the classical architect invented "the Average Man". The projects of architects in the 1950s were undertaken, according to Friedman, to meet the needs of this make-believe entity, and not as an attempt to meet the needs of the actual members of this mobile society.

The teaching of architecture was largely responsible for the "classical" architect's under-estimation of the role of the user. Furthermore, this teaching did not embrace any real theory of architecture. Friedman proposed then teaching manuals for the fundamentals of architecture for the general public.

The spatial city, which is a materialization of this theory, makes it possible for everyone to develop his or her own hypothesis. This is why, in the mobile city, buildings should :

1. touch the ground over a minimum area
2. be capable of being dismantled and moved
3. and be alterable as required by the individual occupant.

== The Spatial City ==
The Spatial City is the most significant application of "mobile architecture". It is raised up on piles which contains inhabited volumes, fitted inside some of the "voids", alternating with other unused volumes, making it look aesthetically pleasant. The basis of its design is that of trihedral elements which operate as "neighbourhoods" where dwellings are distributed without a price.

This structure introduces a kind of merger between countryside and city (compare to Paolo Soleri's Arcology concept) and may span:

- certain unavailable sites,
- areas where building is not possible or permitted (expanses of water, marshland),
- areas that have already been built upon (an existing city),
- above farmland.

This spanning technique which includes container structures ushers in a new development in town-planning. Raised plans increase the original area of the city becoming three-dimensional. The tiering of the spatial city on several independent levels, one on top of the other, determines "spatial town-planning" both from the functional and from the aesthetic viewpoint. The lower level may be earmarked for public life and for premises designed for community services as well as pedestrian areas. The piles contain the vertical means of transport (lifts, staircases). The superposition of levels should make it possible to build a whole industrial city, or a residential or commercial city, on the same site. In this way, the Spatial City forms what Friedman would call an "artificial topography". This grid suspended in space outlines a new cartography of the terrain with the help of a continuous and indeterminate homogeneous network with a major positive outcome: this modular grid would authorize the limitless growth of the city.

The spaces in this grid are rectangular and habitable modular "voids", with an average area of 25–35 square meters. Conversely, the form of the volumes included within the grid depends solely on the occupant, and their configuration set with a "Flatwriter" in the grid is completely free. Only one half of the spatial city would be occupied. The "fillings" which correspond to the dwellings only actually take up 50% of the three-dimensional lattice, permitting the light to spread freely in the spatial city. This introduction of elements on a three-dimensional grid with several levels on piles permits a changeable occupancy of the space by means of the convertibility of the forms and their adaptation to multiple uses.

In Friedman's own words "The city, as a mechanism, is thus nothing other than a labyrinth : a configuration of points of departure, and terminal points, separated by obstacles".

== Major written works ==
- 1958: Mobile architecture
- 1975: Towards a scientific architecture ISBN 0-262-56019-4
- 1980: A better life in towns: [campaign for the renaissance of cities]
- 1999: Yona Friedman. Structures serving the unpredictable ISBN 90-5662-108-4 / ISBN 978-90-5662-108-7
- 2006: Yona Friedman: Pro Domo ISBN 84-96540-51-0
- 2010: Yona Friedman Drawings and models ISBN 978-2-84066-406-2
- 2015: Yona Friedman. The Dilution of Architecture ISBN 978-3-906027-68-5

== Exhibitions ==
- 2017: "Yona Friedman. People's Architecture". Centre des arts de l'École Internationale de Genève – EIG
- Sketches in Permanent Collections: MOMA, New York; Centre Pompidou, Paris.
- 2015: Mobile Architecture: Yona Friedman, Power Station of Art, Shanghai
- 2014: 1001 nuits + 1 jour, mfc-michèle didier
- 2014: Dictionnaire, Promenadologues #3, Cneai, Chatou
- 2014: Yona Friedman, École nationale supérieure d'architecture de Paris-La Villette, Paris
- 2013: Möbianne, Cneai, Chatou
- 2013: Iconostase version 3, Cneai, Chatou
- 2013: Diapositives 1958–2002, Cneai, Chatou
- 2012: "Yona Friedman. Genesis of a Vision". Centre Archizoom – EPFL
- 2012: Le Musée de rue et le Musée iconostase, Cneai, Chatou
- 2012: Handbuch, Berlin – Paris 2012, Galerie Chert, Berlin
- 2011: "Architecture Without Buildings", Ludwig Museum, Budapest
- 2009: Venice Biennale, Inventing Worlds.
- 2007: Dare to make your own exhibition, Cneai, Chatou
- 2007: Shanghai Biennale
- 2005: Venice Biennale
- 2003: Venice Biennale
- 2002: Yokohama Triennale

== See also ==
- Archigram
- Constantin Xenakis
- Manfredi Nicoletti
- Megastructures (architecture)
- Metabolist Movement
