= Embassy of Kuwait, Tokyo =

Embassy of the State of Kuwait, Tokyo
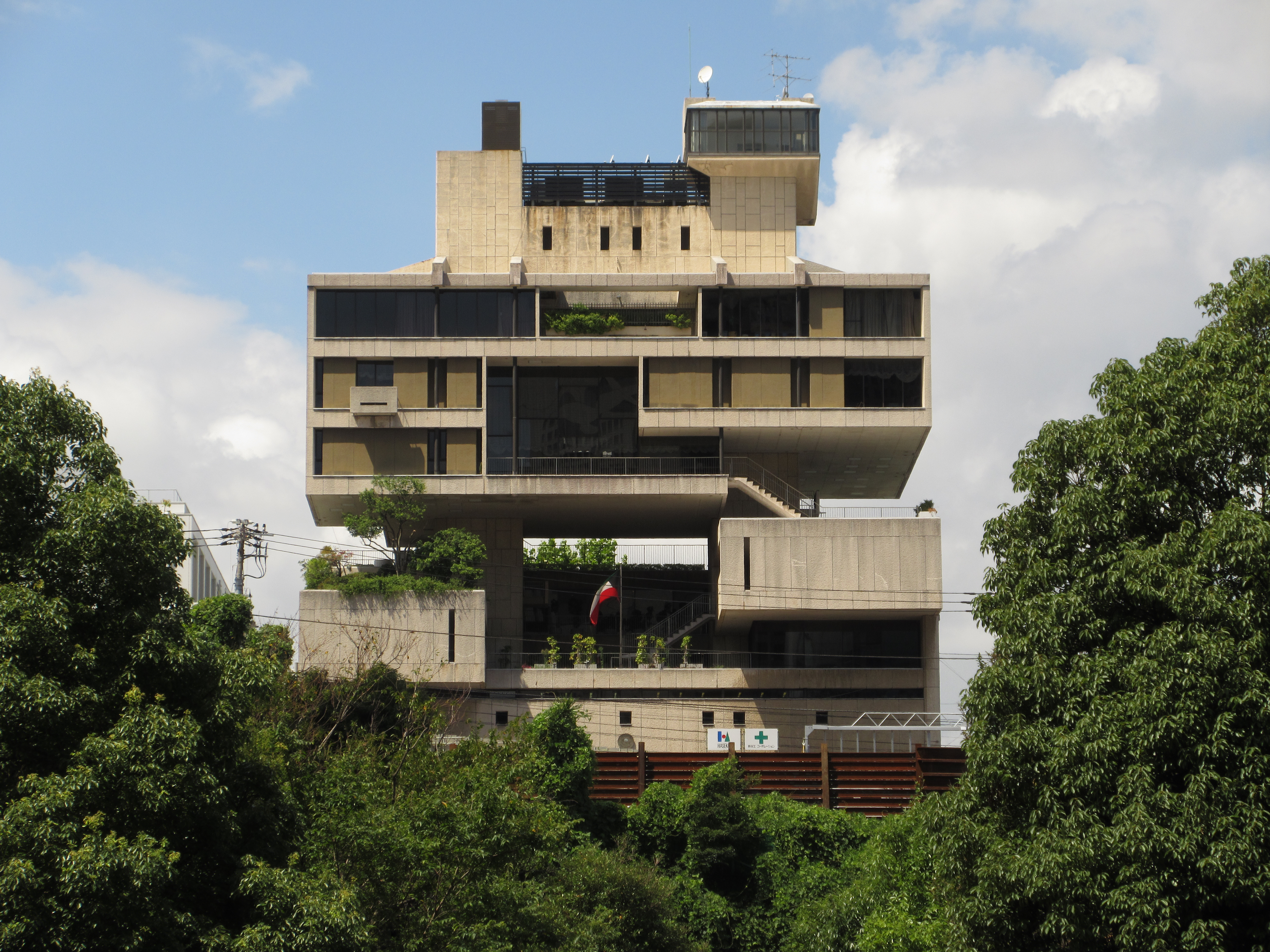
- Location: Mita, Tokyo
- Address: 4 Chome-13-12 Mita, Minato, Tokyo 108-0073
- Ambassador: Sami GH. AL-ZAMANAN

The Embassy of the State of Kuwait in Tokyo is the diplomatic mission of Kuwait in Japan. The embassy faces Hijirizaka and neighbours Mita Junior High School. The area was known as Tsuki no Misaki in the Edo period and was a popular subject of haiku poetry and ukiyo-e.

The embassy was opened on 20 February 1962, following the country's independence in 1961. The current building was designed by Kenzo Tange and completed in 1970. It is an example of brutalism and metabolism. It is noted for being one of the few works by Tange in Japan built in the 1970s, as most of his works during this decade were built outside Japan. The contractor was Kajima.
