= Shizuoka Press and Broadcasting Center =

Building in Tokyo, Japan

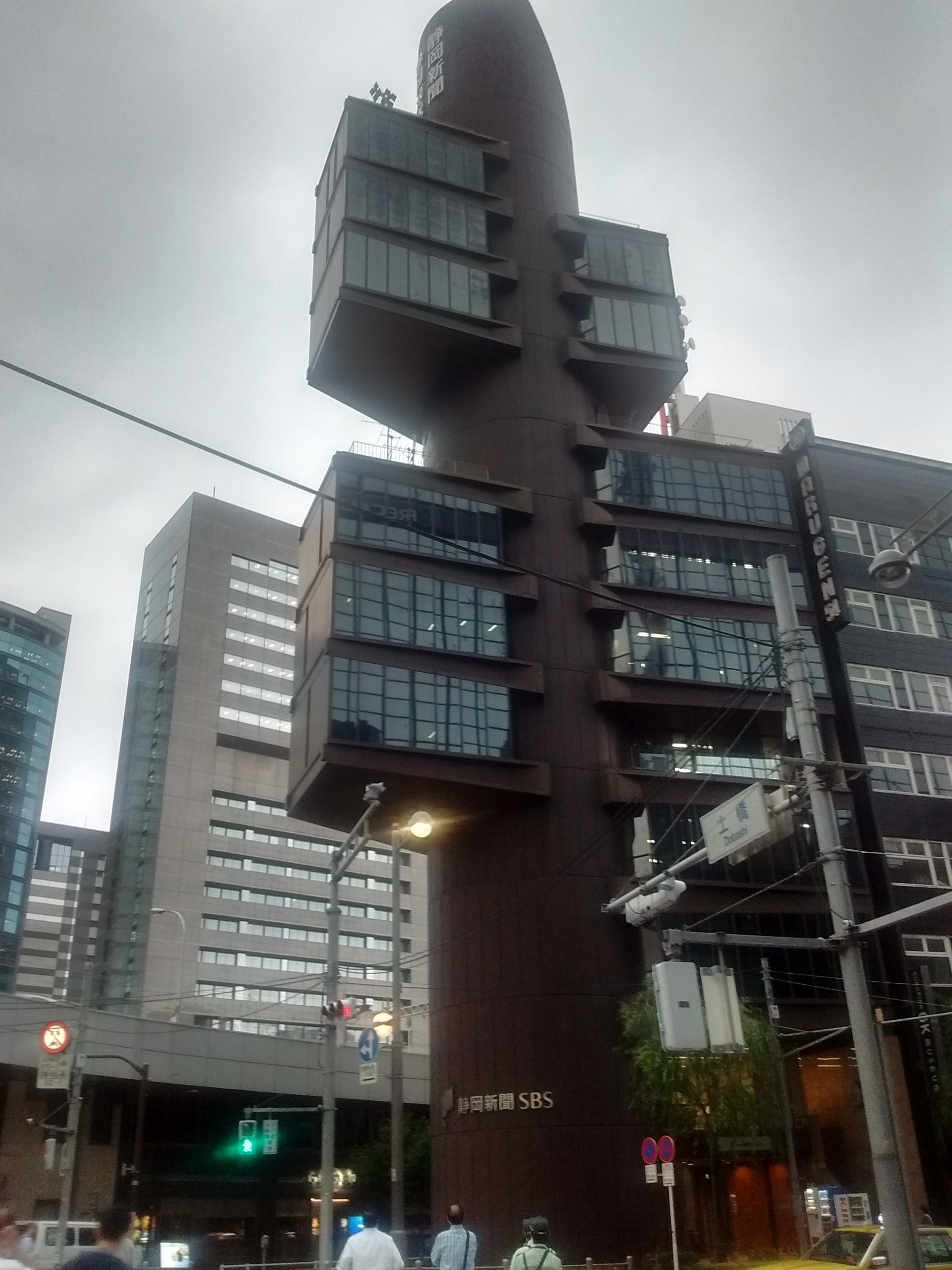

General information
- Type: Office
- Architectural style: Metabolism
- Location: 8 Chome-3-7 Ginza, Chuo City, Tokyo 104-0061, Japan
- Coordinates: 35°40′07″N 139°45′32″E
- Completed: 1967
- Height: 57 m (187 ft)

Technical details
- Floor count: 12

Design and construction
- Architect(s): Kenzo Tange

The Shizuoka Press and Broadcasting Center is a building located in Ginza, Tokyo, Japan. Built in 1967, it is considered to be the first realization of Kenzo Tange's Metabolist movement, which called for a new urban typology that could self-perpetuate in an organic, "metabolic" way. It was built on a 189 square metres (2,030 sq ft) triangular site, and erected around a column, 7.7 metres (25 ft) in diameter, which forms the building's central core, and around which thirteen individual offices are connected asymmetrically. The building was meant to be a prototype for a perpetually regenerating, prefabricated urban megastructure. It was designed with the intention that the space between the office clusters could be filled with additional offices in the future as demand increased. However, this idea was never realized and the building remains unchanged since it was built. Despite this, it is still considered to be a aesthetically notable example of form and function.

== Metabolist movement ==
After World War II, a group of Japanese architects, including Kenzo Tange, began exploring the concept of "Metabolism" in their work. Tange and the Metabolist movement believed that design and technology should be a reflection of human society and that they should strive to actively encourage the development of society through their designs. They saw human society as a continuous process of growth and development, like the biological concept of metabolism, and wanted to use their designs to promote this growth. Tange and the Metabolist movement influenced a number of 20th century architects in both East and Western hemispheres.

== See also ==
- Nakagin Capsule Tower
- Shizuoka Broadcasting System
- Shizuoka Shimbun
