= Noboru Kawazoe =

Japanese author (1926–2015)

Noboru Kawazoe (川添 登, Kawazoe Noboru) (1926–2015) was a Japanese author, editor, architectural critic and one of the founding members of the Japanese Metabolist Movement.

== Early life and education ==
Kawazoe was born in Tokyo in 1926. He was recruited to the military just four months before the end of World War II. Kawazoe studied at Waseda University, graduating in 1953. By 1955 he became editor at Shinkenchiku. In 1956 he started an English edition of Shinkenchiku, called "The Japan Architect".

== Metabolist Movement ==
Not long after resigning as editor of Shinkenchiku in 1957, Kawazoe began regularly meeting with Kisho Kurokawa and Kiyonore Kikutake. These meetings to discuss ideas precipitated into a "Theme Committee", organised in 1959, ahead of the 1960 World Design Conference in Tokyo. Kawazoe led this committee alongside Kikutake, and Kurokawa as well as architect, Masato Otaka.

Kawazoe would go on to contribute essays to Metabolist publications. He wrote "Material and Man" for the seminal metabolist manifesto "Metabolism" (1960).

== Selected works ==
- Ise: Prototype of Japanese Architecture (1965)
- Contemporary Japanese Architecture (1968, available in English 1973)
- Jingu: A Temple of Forest and Peace (2015)
