= Daikan-yama Station =

Railway station in Tokyo, Japan

Coordinates: 35.648038°N 139.703205°E

Daikan-yama Station 代官山駅

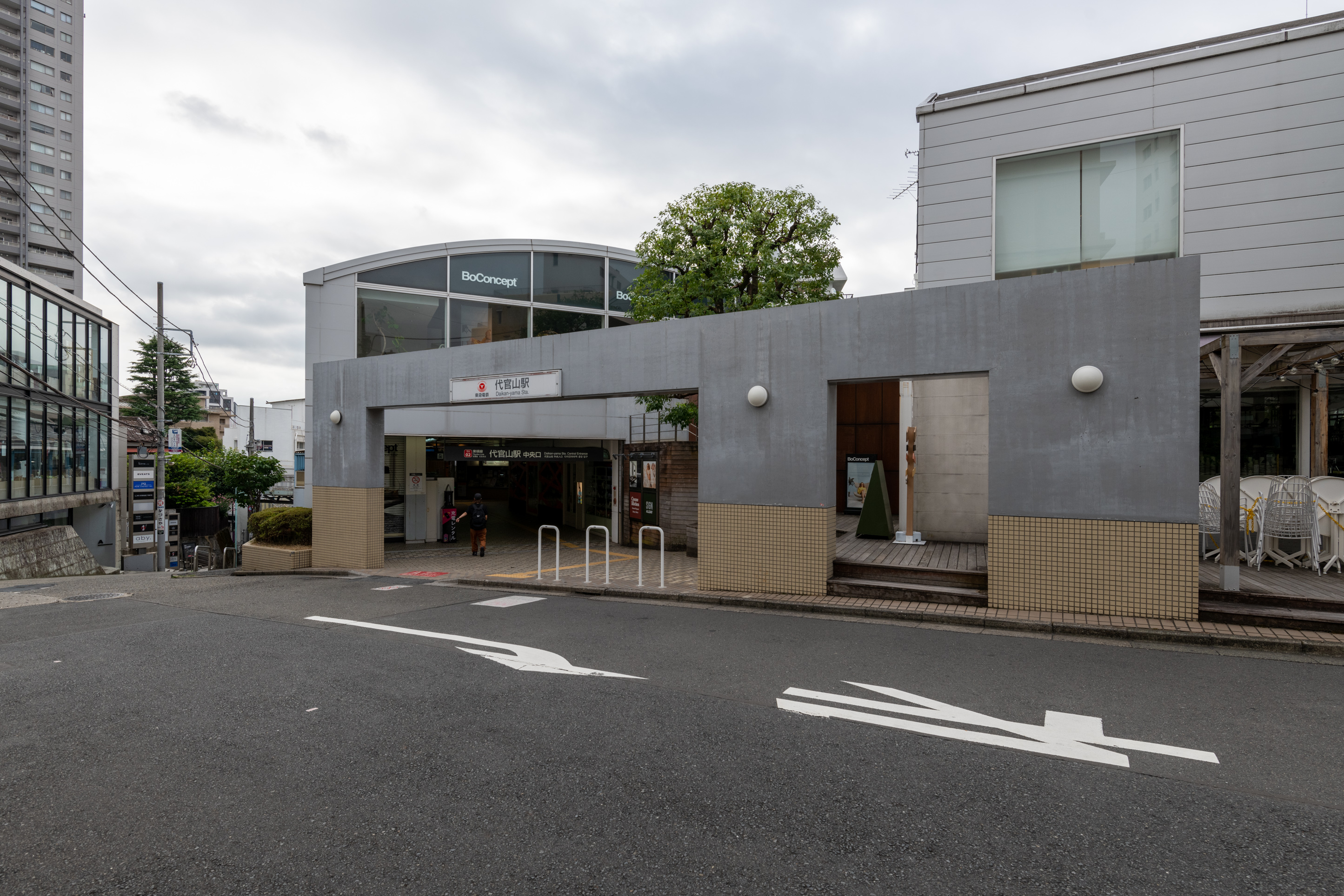
- The station entrance in August 2022

General information
- Location: 19-4 Daikanyamachō, Shibuya-ku, Tokyo 150-0034; Japan
- Operator: Tōkyū Railways
- Line: Tōyoko Line
- Platforms: 2 side platforms
- Tracks: 2
- Connections: Bus stop

Construction
- Structure type: At grade

Other information
- Station code: TY02

History
- Opened: 28 August 1927; 98 years ago

Passengers
- FY2013: 29,483 daily

Services
Preceding station	Tōkyū Railways	Following station
Naka-meguro towards Yokohama	Tōyoko Line Local	Shibuya Terminus
Location
- Location within Tokyo Yamanote Loop Location within Tokyo wards area Location within Japan

Daikan-yama Station (代官山駅, Daikan-yama-eki) is a railway station on the Tokyu Toyoko Line in Shibuya, Tokyo, Japan, operated by the private railway operator Tokyu Corporation.

== Station layout ==
This station consists of two opposed side platforms serving two tracks. This station can only accommodate eight-car-length trains.

=== Platforms ===
1	Tōyoko Line	for Naka-meguro, Jiyūgaoka, Musashi-Kosugi, Kikuna and Yokohama; Minatomirai Line for Minatomirai and Motomachi-Chūkagai
2	Tōyoko Line	for Shibuya; Tokyo Metro Fukutoshin Line for Ikebukuro; Tobu Tojo Line for Kawagoeshi and Shinrinkōen; Seibu Ikebukuro Line for Hannō

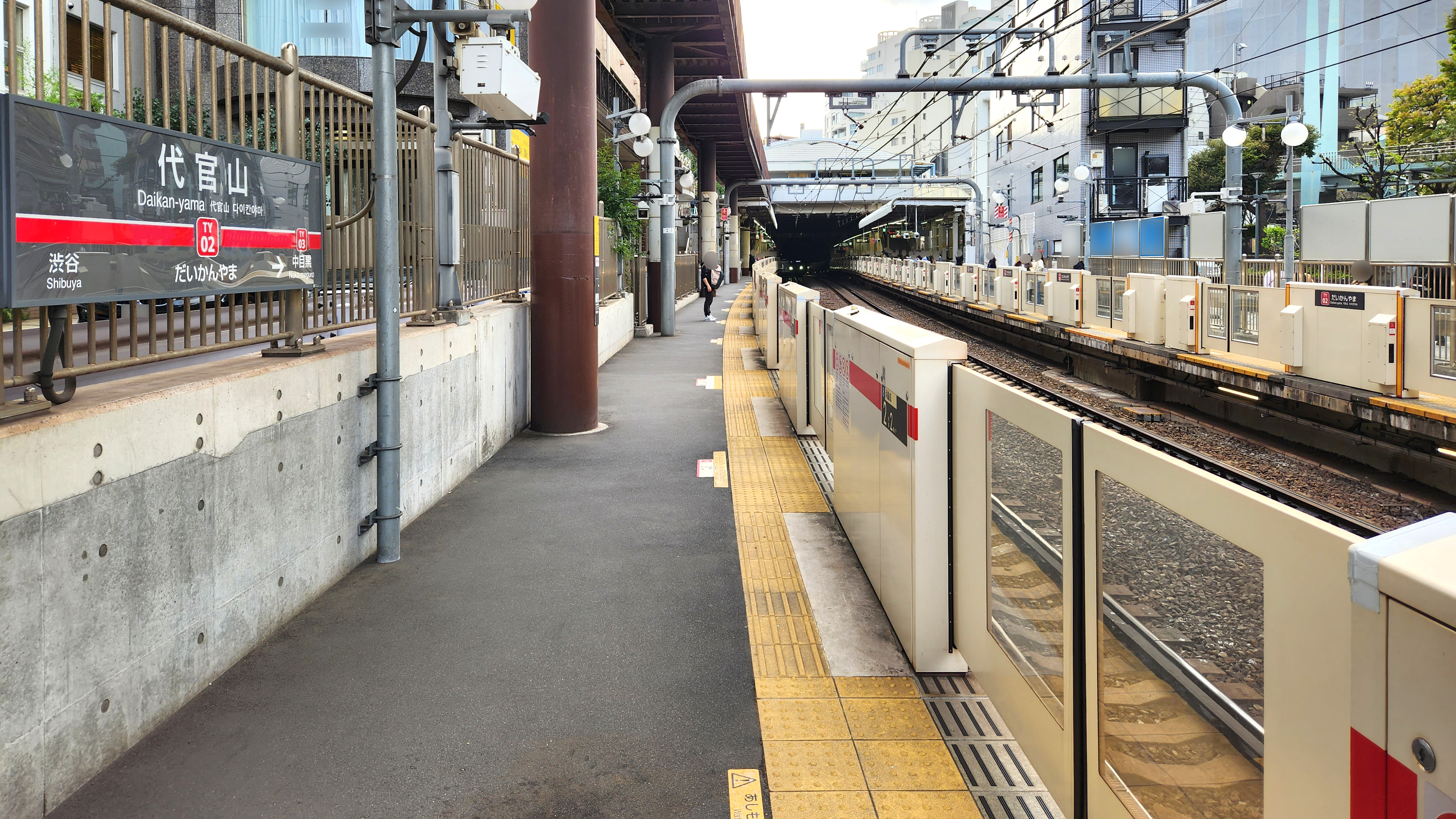
The platforms in April 2023

== History ==
Daikan-yama Station opened on 28 August 1927, 18 months after the Tokyu Toyoko line opened. On March 15, 2013, the Shibuya Station above-ground train platforms closed down to serve the new underground platforms at the same station to serve the through service from the Tokyo Metro Fukutoshin Line through services. As a result, the line between Daikan-yama and Shibuya Stations had to be replaced with a new section of underground track. On the morning of 16 March 2013, Tokyu Corporation started construction on converting the upwards slope at Daikan-yama station downwards. This included doing the same to the tracks and platforms to accommodate the new underground section. A total of 1,200 engineers worked 3 hours and 25 minutes throughout the night to lower the slope downwards.

== Surrounding area ==
The station serves an area where many foreign embassies are located. The area is also famous for its stylish neighborhoods with many sidewalk cafes, patisseries, restaurants, and from high fashion boutiques to vintage clothing shops. Between Shibuya and Ebisu stations, it is located on the western plateau of Shibuya on the Tōyoko Line nestled between the Meguro and Shibuya Rivers.

== See also ==
- List of railway stations in Japan
