= Daikanyamachō, Shibuya =

District in Shibuya, Tokyo, Japan

Coordinates: 35°39′6″N 139°42′20″E

Daikanyamachō 代官山町
- Neighborhood in Shibuya
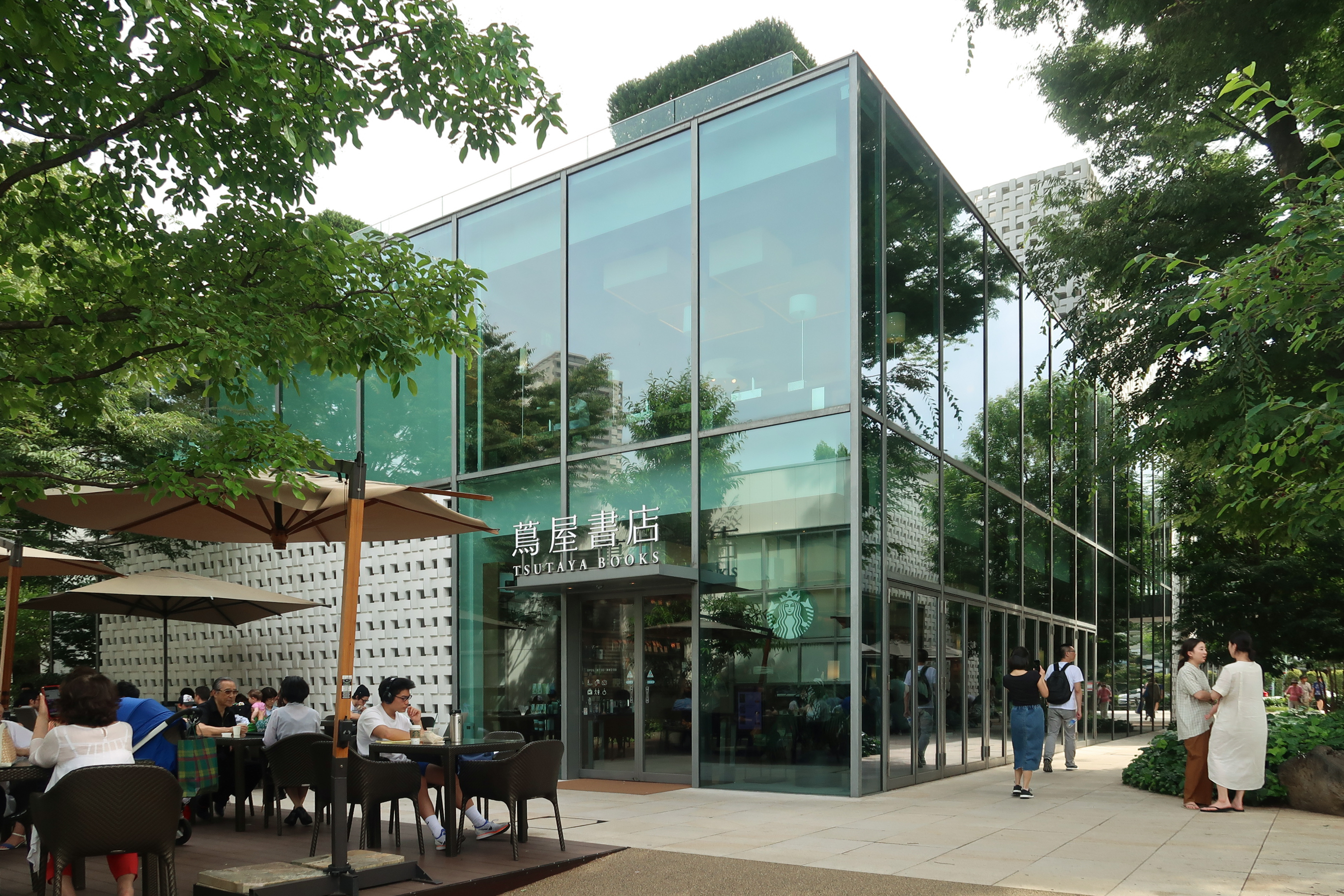
- Daikanyama T-Site
- Interactive map of Daikanyamachō
- Country: Japan
- Prefecture: Tokyo
- Special ward: Shibuya

Population (1 October 2020)
  - Total: 2,078
- Time zone: UTC+09:00
- ZIP code: 150-0034
- Telephone area code: 03

Daikanyamachō (代官山町, Daikan'yama-chō), or simply Daikanyama (代官山), is a neighborhood in Shibuya, Tokyo, Japan. The neighborhood is known for its small boutique shops, giving it the nickname "the Brooklyn of Tokyo." It is served by Daikan-yama Station on the Tokyu Toyoko Line.

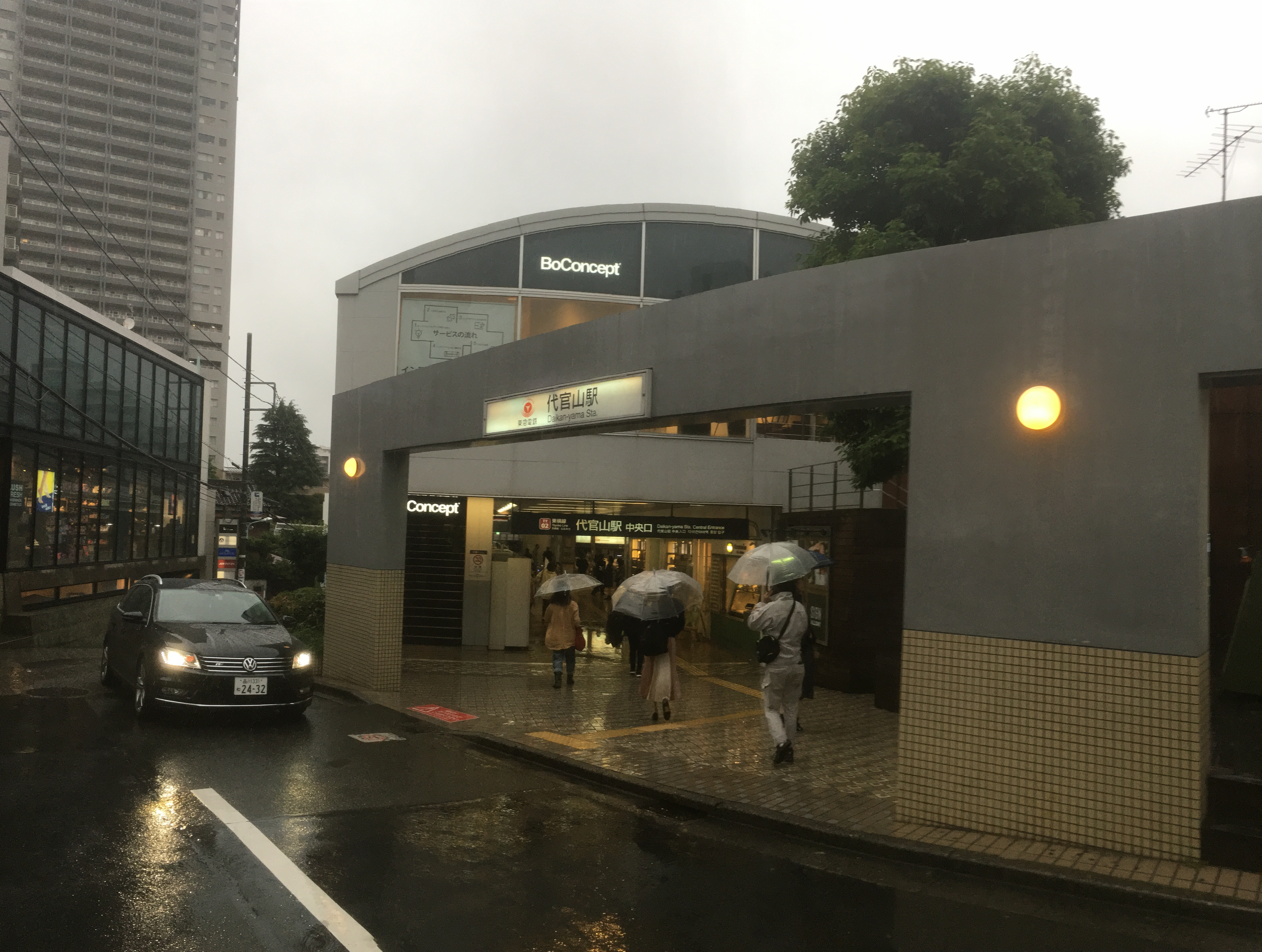
Daikan-yama Station

== Education ==
Shibuya Board of Education operates public elementary and junior high schools.

Elementary schools are zoned as follows:

- Sarugaku Elementary School (猿楽小学校): 1–12, most of 13 (except for two lots), 14–17, 18 (except for one lot), and 19-20-ban
- Nagayato Elementary School (長谷戸小学校): two lots in 13-ban and one lot in 18-ban

All of Daikanyamacho is zoned to Hachiyama Junior High School (鉢山中学校).

== Gallery ==
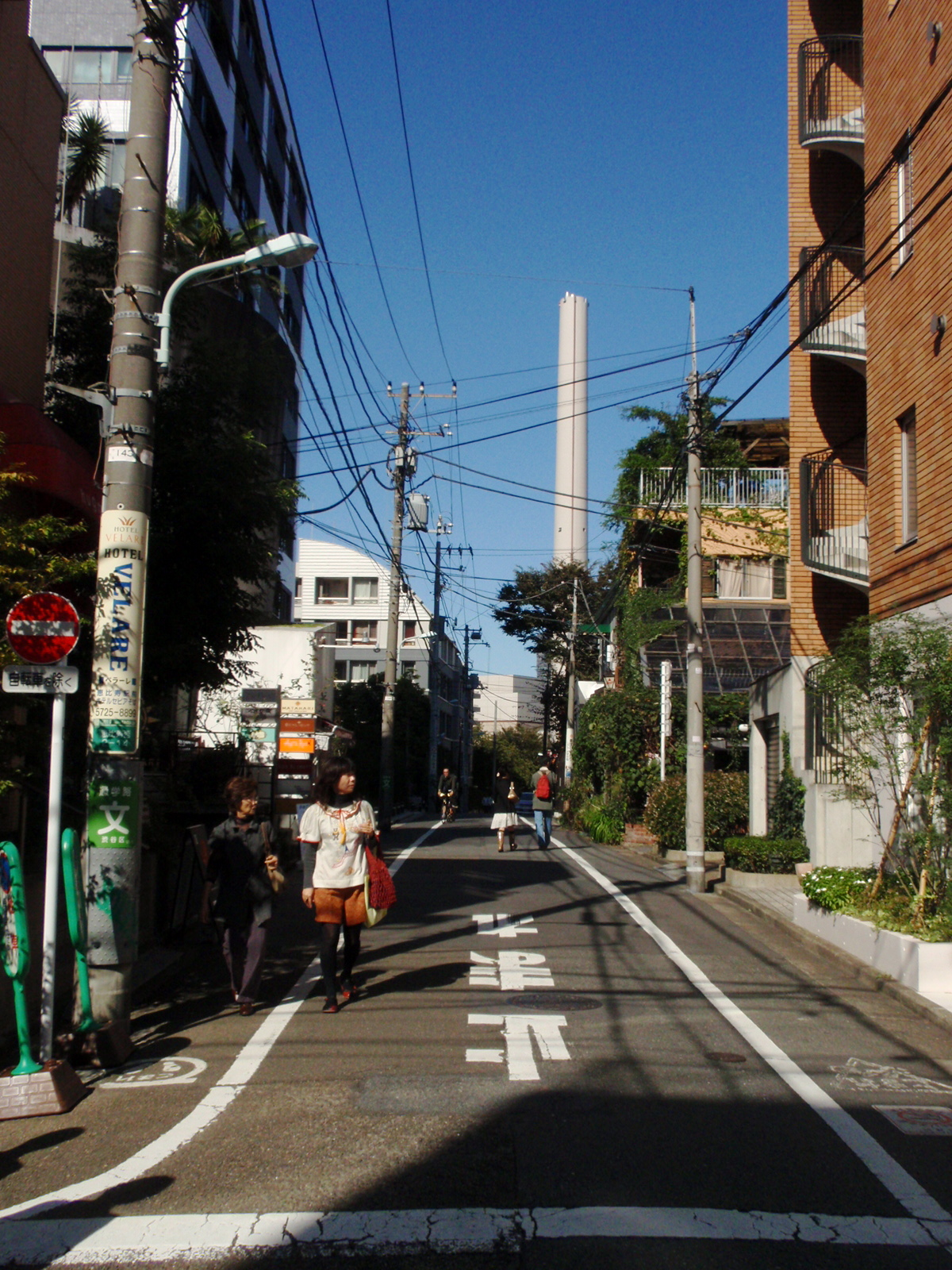
Backstreet in Daikanyama

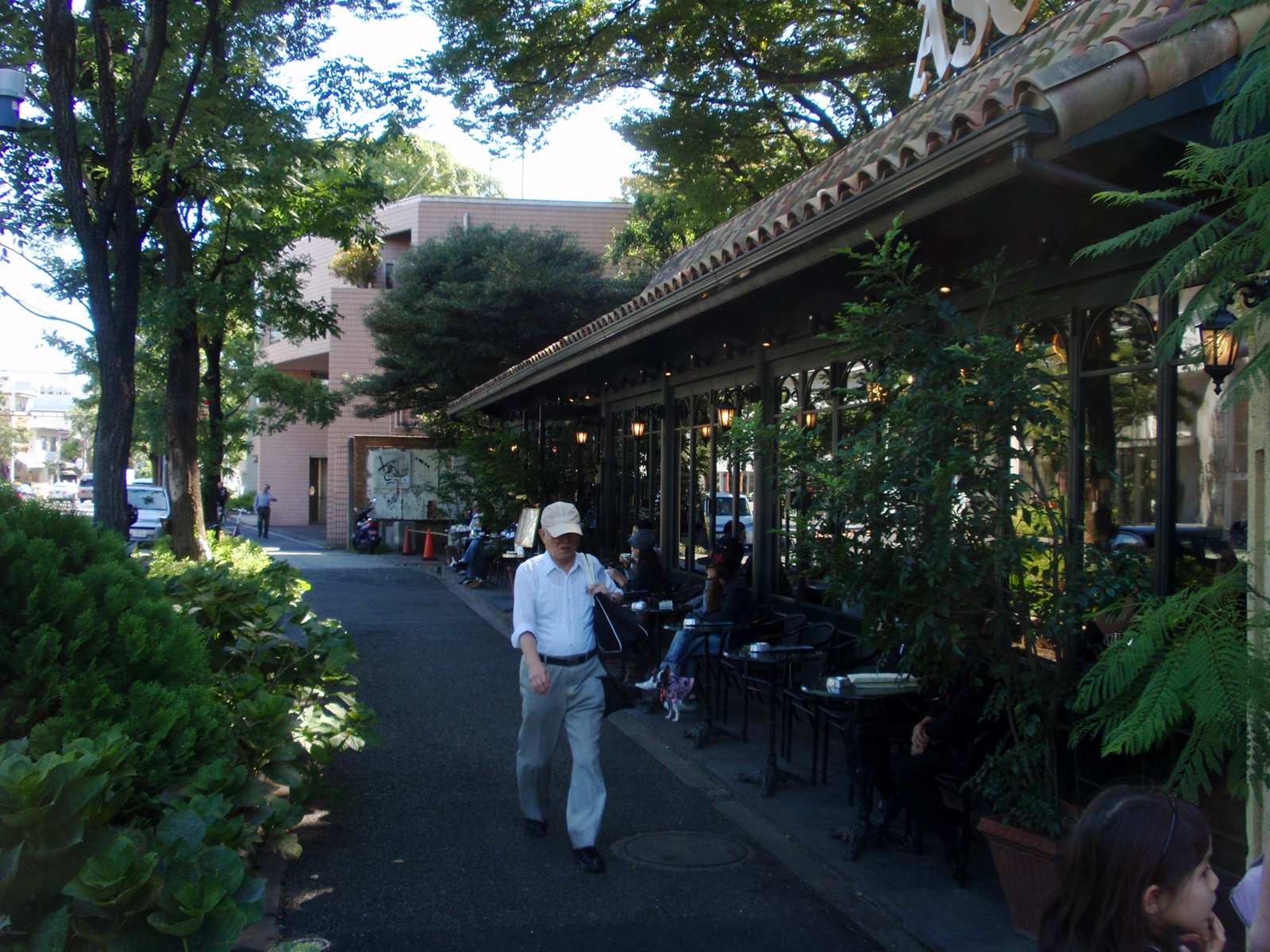
Sidewalk cafe in Daikanyama

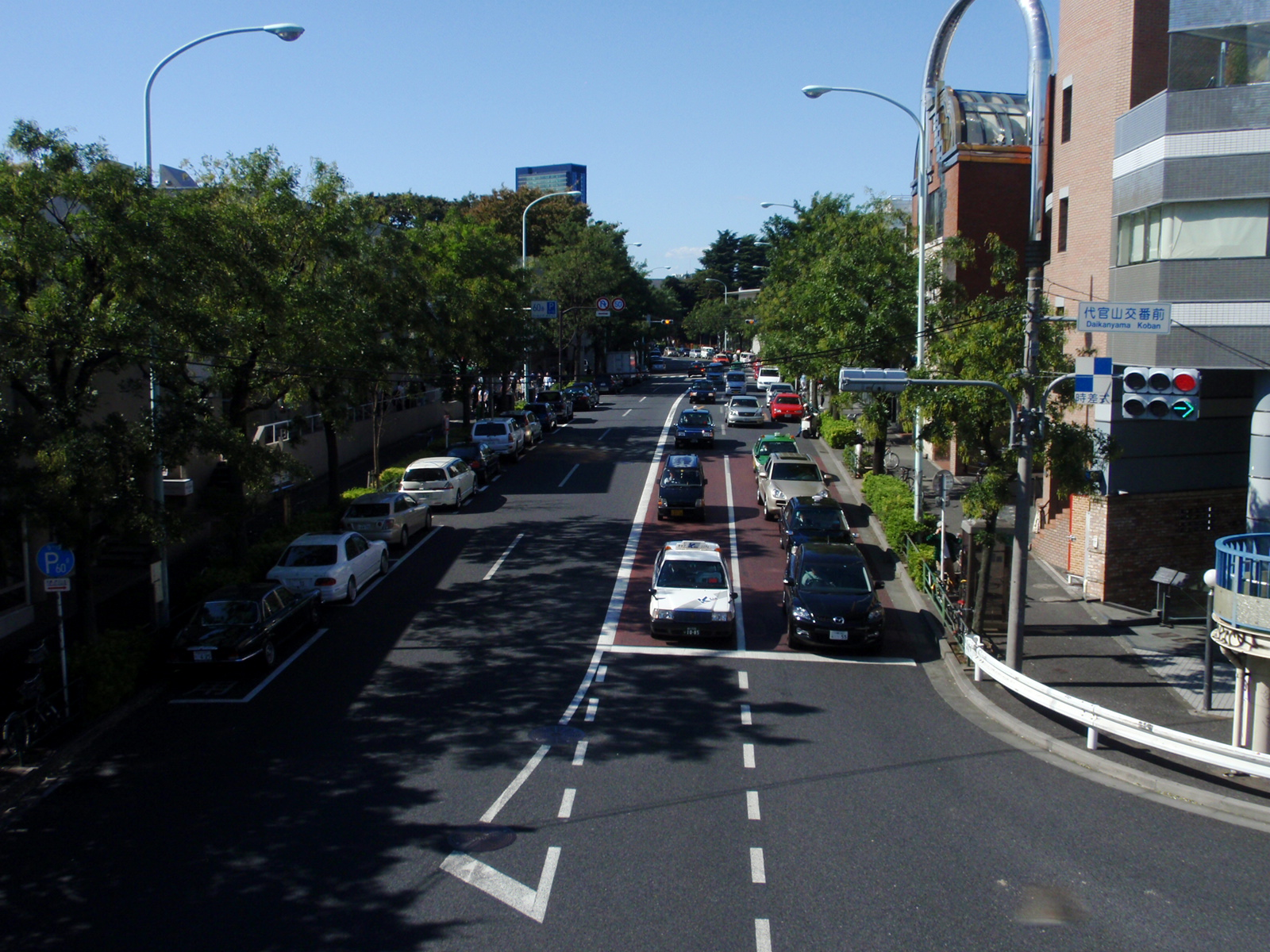
Main road in Daikanyama as seen from a pedestrian bridge

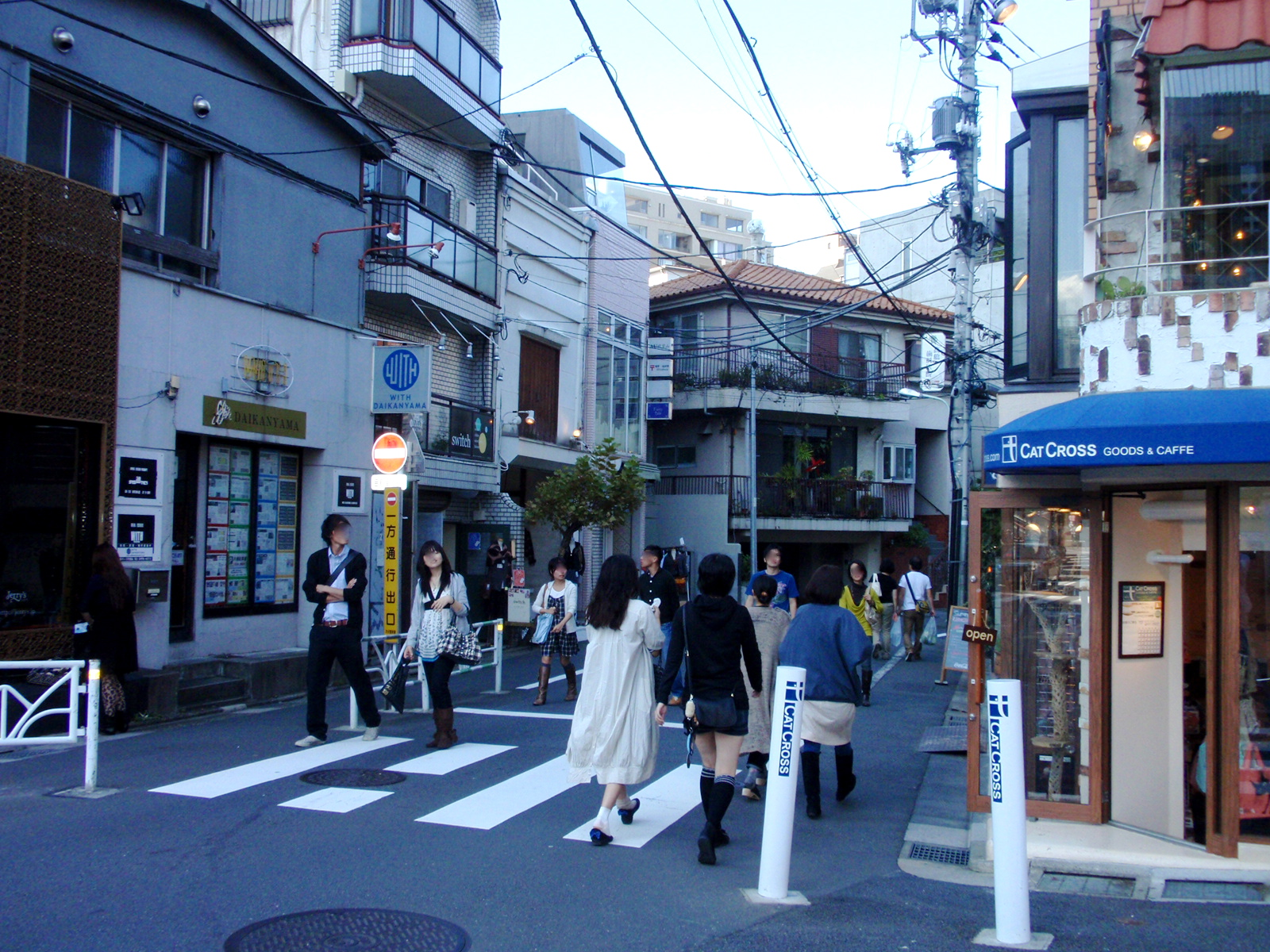
Street scene, Daikanyama
