= Megastructure (planning concept) =

Architectural concept

Megastructure is an architectural and urban concept of the post-war era, which envisions a city or an urban form that could be encased in a massive single human-made structure or a relatively small number of interconnected structures. In a megastructural project, orders and hierarchies are created with large and permanent structures supporting small and transitional ones.

According to John W. Cook and Heinrich Klotz, the lexical meaning of megastructure is an over-scaled, colossal, multi-unit architectural mass. The post-war megastructure movements led by avant-garde architectural groups such as Metabolists and Archigram regarded megastructure as an instrument to solve issues of urban disorder.

Megastructure was once the dominant tendency in architecture of the 1960s, which resulted in numerous radical architectural proposals and a few built projects.

== History ==
=== Urban antecedents ===
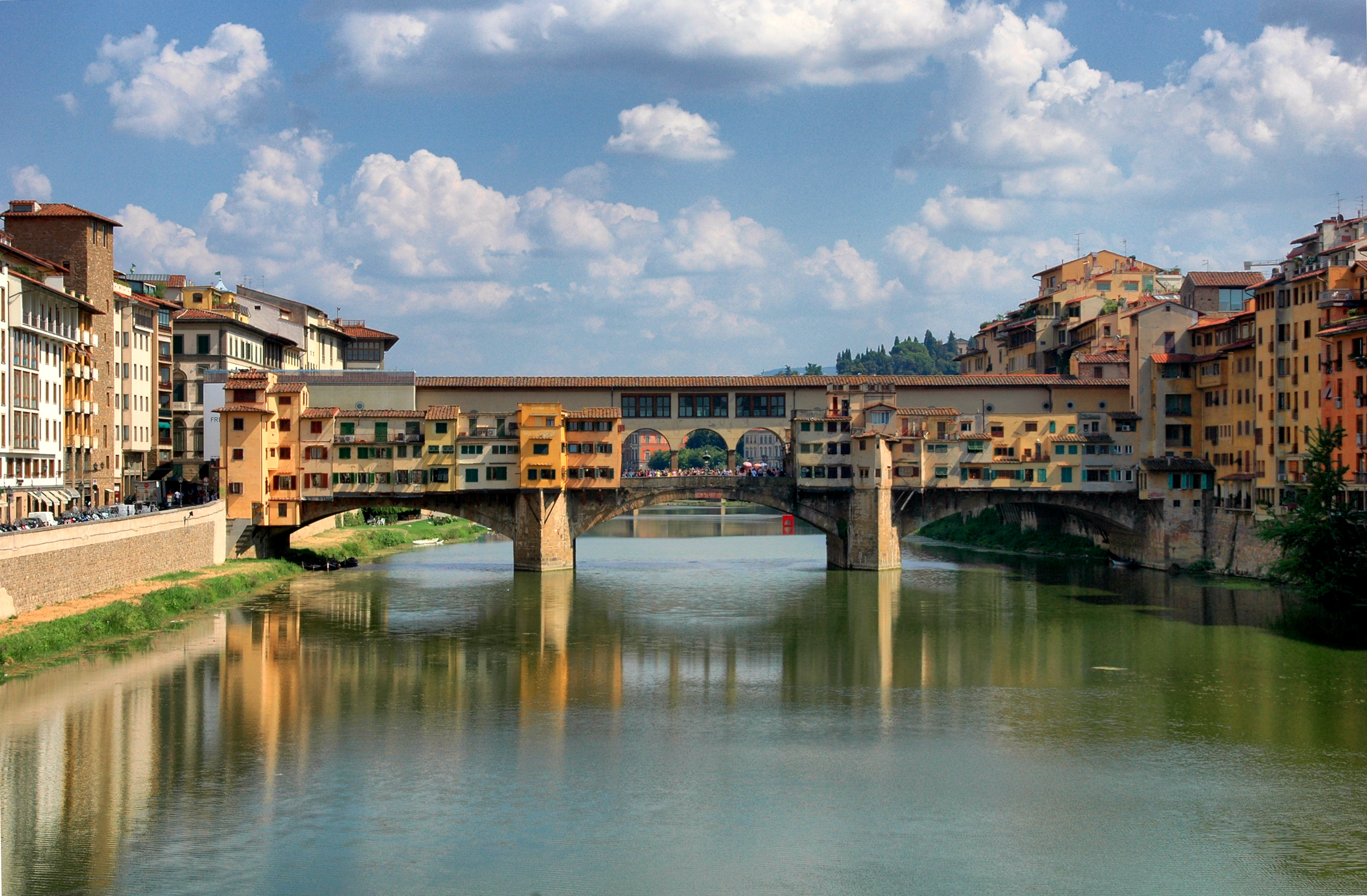
Ponte Vecchio in Florence, Italy

The emergence of megastructural characters in built forms can be found in pre-industrial built forms such as Ponte Vecchio in Florence, Italy. This multi-level bridge, built in 1345, has numerous housings and shops attached on its structures above the Arno River. Although there is no evidence of architect-designed system, architect Paul Rudolph, in his discussion with John Cook and Heinrich Klotz, regarded the bridge as the best model of megastructure.

The Milan Central Station project, which was designed by Antonio Sant’Elia in 1914, is one of the most influential antecedents of post-war megastructure movements. As Reyner Banham pointed out in his book Megastructure: Urban Futures of the Recent Past, Milan Central Station not only invented a spatial arrangement of a huge building connecting to urban traffic arteries, but also developed an A-frame structural system that had then been widely used in megastructural proposals.

After World War II, in a series of design competition for institutional buildings in Britain such as the Sheffield University competition (1953), megastructural approaches emerged in some schemes that incorporated small-scale building entities supported by architectural frames within giant buildings.

=== Megastructure movements in the early 1960s ===
The rise of megastructure movements happened in 1959 when the Japanese architect Kenzō Tange and his students at the Massachusetts Institute of Technology (MIT) published the Boston Harbor project. This project is widely regarded as the first true megastructure. What followed the publication were megastructure movements around the world.

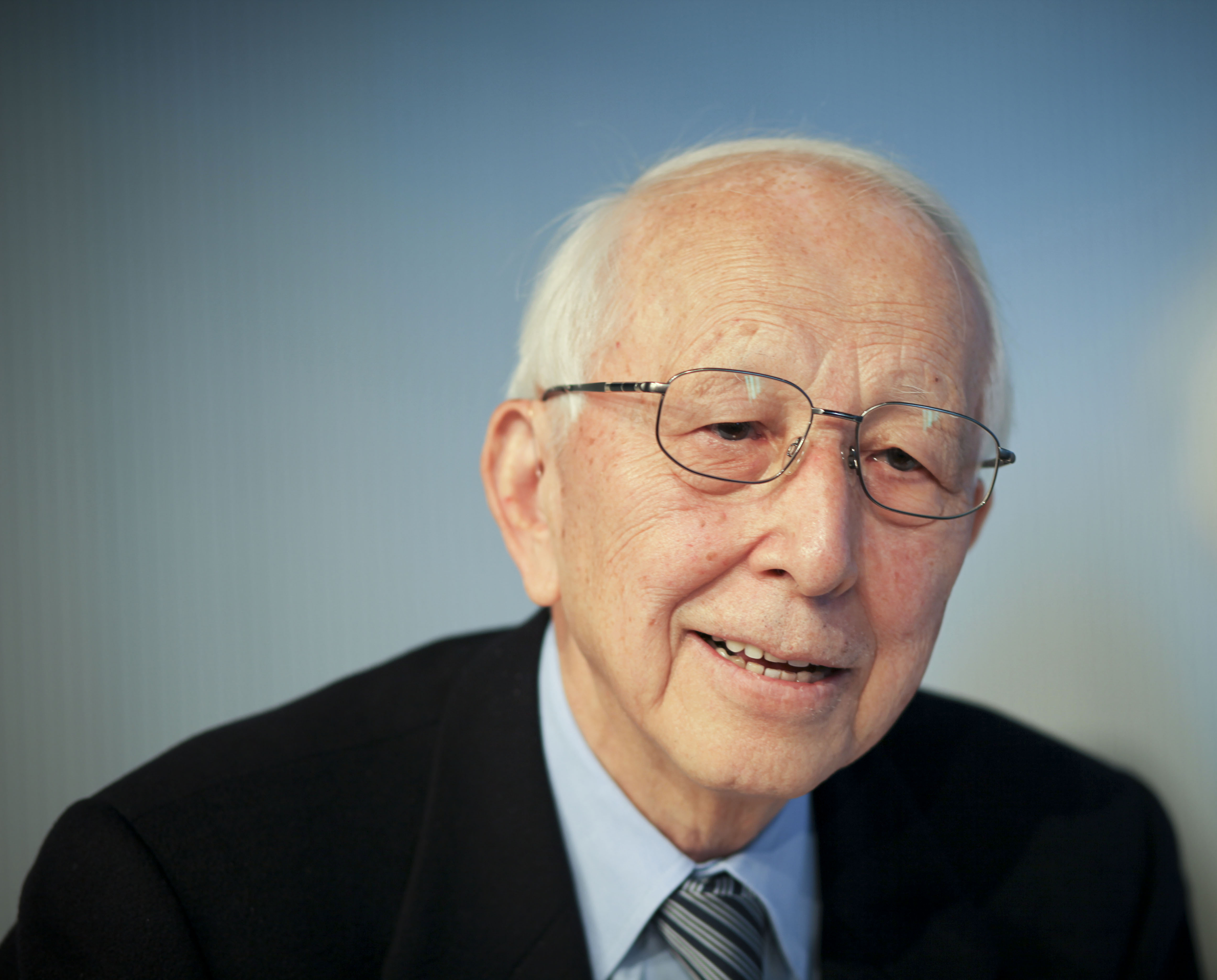
Fumihiko Maki in 2010

At the 1960 World Design Conference in Tokyo, a group of Japanese architects launched the Metabolism manifesto with their megastructural approaches for architecture and urbanism. Fumihiko Maki, one of the core members of Metabolists, promoted a megastructure as a large form that houses multiple functions and urban environments. According to Project Japan Metabolism Talks, the main approach of megastructure under the Metabolism is to create artificial land equipped with infrastructure. This approach, materialized in Ocean City project (Kiyonori Kikutake, 1962) and Shinjuku Station Redevelopment project (Fumihiko Maki, 1962), aims to provide more space for small-scale programs to be built in a congested city.

At the same time, European architects also initiated megastructure movements by forming megastructural groups and schools with various theories and approaches. One of the most influential groups among them was Archigram based at the Architectural Association in London. In the 1961 pamphlet "Archigram I" the group advocated a megastructural approach for buildings and cities which emphasizes technology, infrastructure, and dynamic movements within megastructures (Simon Sadler, Archigram: Architecture Without Architecture). Projects by Archigram, such as the Walking City (Ron Herron, 1964) and Plug-in-City (Peter Cook, 1964), illustrated the future of city where modular structures and movable urban entities resemble fun and flexibility.

Reyner Banham saw 1964 as a 'Megayear' in which megastructure movements around the world culminated with diverse approaches evolved into a common place to address serious propositions such as social and economic responsibilities. Many projects utilized megastructures as an instrument to increase commercial values of land and smoothen traffic networks at transportation nodes.

=== The Expo 67 ===
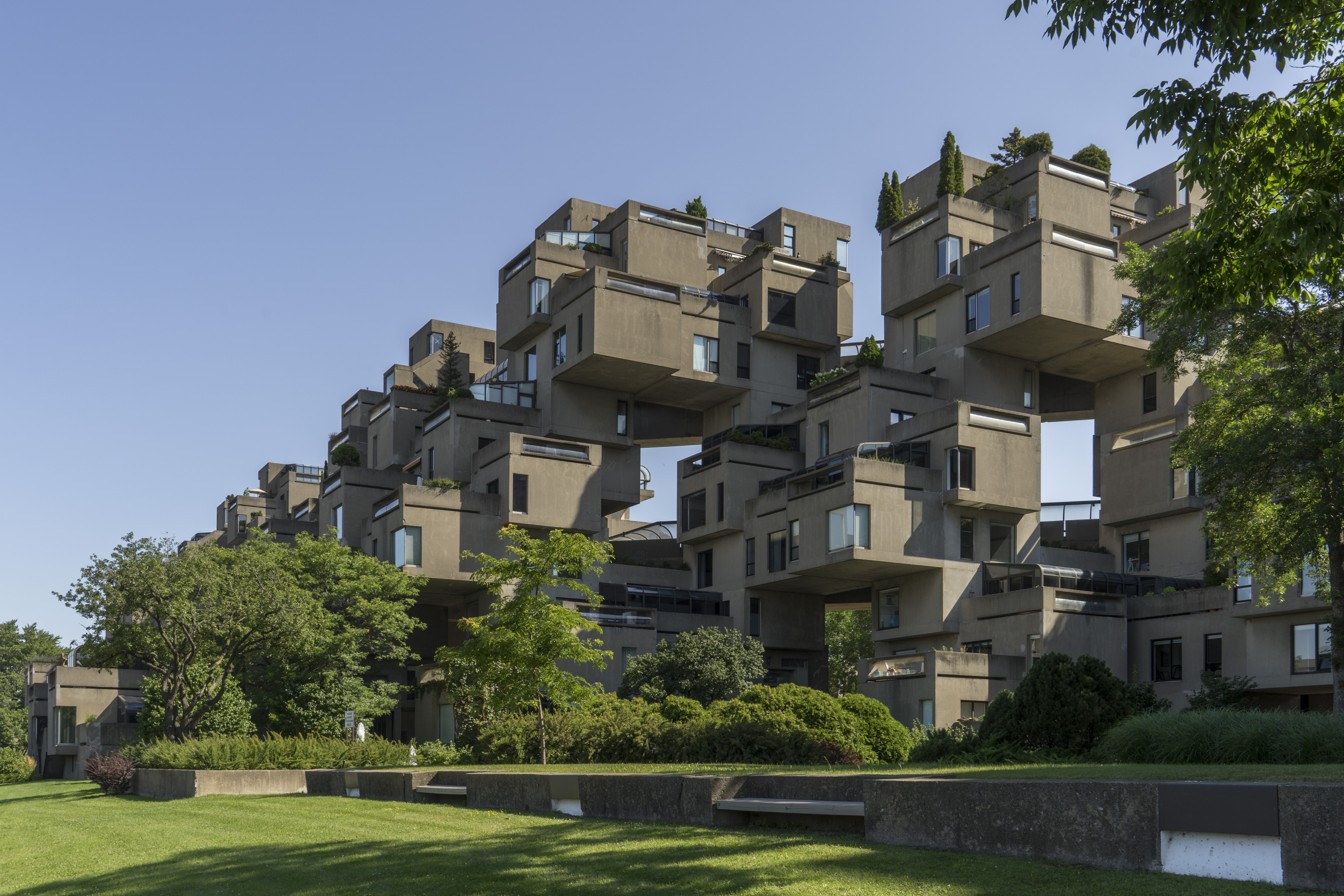
Habitat '67, a housing complex built for Expo 67

The Expo 67 held in Montreal, Quebec was a significant event for megastructure movements. During the Expo, various pavilions exhibited megastructure features, such as the USA, Netherlands and Theme pavilions, as well as Habitat '67.

Architectural critics visiting the exhibition were struck by Montreal's Grain elevators which, with their networks of covered conveyors belts, irresistibly evoked the images of megastructures touted in experimental circles.

In addition to exhibited megastructures, Montreal’s subway system also evoked megastructures as it is directly connected to several downtown buildings, which eventually evolved into the famed Underground City.

=== After the 1960s ===
After the avant-garde movements of the 1960s, megastructure was mainly proposed and practiced in academe. Reyner Banham has, however, identified some university and hospital designs derived from megastructural approaches, with modular, interconnected buildings and pedestrian-oriented environments. He highlights the McMaster University Health Sciences Center (Craig, Zeidler and Strong) in Hamilton, Ontario, which opened in 1972, and the Free University of Berlin (Candilis/Josic/Woods/Schidhelm), designed 1963, built in two stages between 1967 and 1979, which are projects designed with megastructural approaches.

== Projects ==
=== Boston Harbor project, Kenzo Tange and students at MIT, 1959 ===
Boston Harbor project is an experimental housing project done by students at Massachusetts Institute of Technology under the instruction of Kenzo Tange, who was a visiting instructor at the institute in 1959. The project resulted in a megastructure with an A-frame structure shaped by two expandable housing blocks. Each block consists of multiple layers of platforms for residential accommodations to be built. A series of transportation infrastructures including roads and monorail tracks are placed in the void space between two blocks.

=== Shinjuku redevelopment project, Tokyo, Fumihiko Maki, 1962 ===
Shinjuku redevelopment project is a large-scale urban design projects under the Metabolism movement of Japan. In this project, Maki proposed an expandable urban space consisting of artificial ground platforms and plazas on and above ground. These structures span across Shinjuku Station and allow new shops and housing units to be built upon.

=== Plug-in-City project, Peter Cook, 1963-4 ===
Plug-in-City is a project by Archigram members. The project depicts a megastructure with a "kit of parts" system, in which standardized housing units are mass-produced and plugged into a series of infrastructural frameworks.

=== The Walking City, Ron Herron and Brian Harvey, 1964 ===
The Walking City envisions utopian human settlements that resemble robots or artificial organisms with mechanical legs that move residents along with their homes to different cities and places.

== See also ==
- Arcology
- Megaproject
- Structuralism (architecture)

== Bibliography ==
- Reyner Banham, Megastructure - Urban Futures of the Recent Past, 224 p., Thames and Hudson, London 1976.
- Sabrina van der Ley & Markus Richter (eds.), Megastructure Reloaded - Visionary Architecture and Urban Design of the Sixties Reflected by Contemporary Artists, 287 p., Hatje Cantz, Ostfildern near Stuttgart 2008.
- John W. Cook and Heinrich Klotz, Conversations with Architects, Praeger Publishers, New York, 1973.
- Rem Koolhaas; Hans U Obrist, Project Japan Metabolism Talks, Taschen, London 2011.
- Fumihiko Maki, Investigation in Collective Form, A Special Publication, The School of Architecture, Washington University in St. Louis, June 1964.
