= Kunio Maekawa =

Japanese architect (1905–1986)

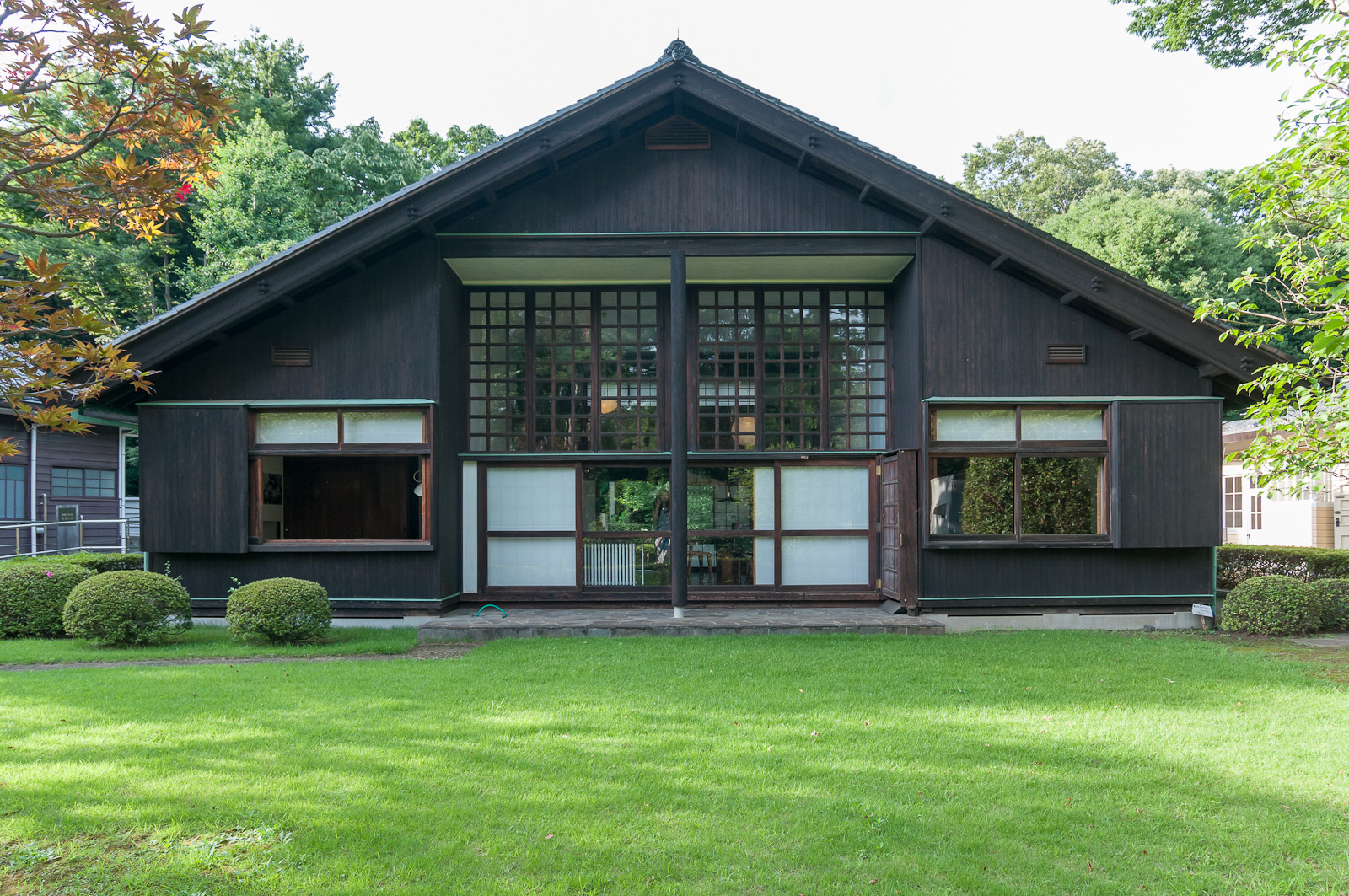
- Maekawa House in the Edo-Tokyo Open Air Architectural Museum
- Born: 14 May 1905; Niigata, Niigata Prefecture, Japan
- Died: 26 June 1986 (aged 81); Toranomon, Minato, Japan
- Education: Tokyo Imperial University
- Occupation: Architect
- Practice: Mayekawa Kumio Associates
- Buildings: Kyoto Kaikan, Kyoto; National Museum of Modern Art, Tokyo; Saitama Prefectural Museum of History and Folklore, Saitama; The Miyagi Museum of Art, Sendai
- Projects: Okayama Prefectural Government Office, Okayama; Tokyo Bunka Kaikan, Tokyo; Tokio Marine & Nichido Fire Insurance Building, Tokyo

Kunio Maekawa (前川 國男, Maekawa Kunio; 14 May 1905 – 26 June 1986) was a Japanese architect and a key figure of modernism in post-war Japan. After early stints in the studios of Le Corbusier and Antonin Raymond, Maekawa began to articulate his architectural language after establishing his firm in 1935, maintaining a continuous tension between Japanese traditional design and European architectural modernism throughout his career.

Firmly insistent that both civic and vernacular architecture should be rendered through a modernist lens appropriate to the contemporary lifestyle of the Japanese people, Maekawa's early work and competition entries consistently pushed back against the dominant Imperial Crown Style. His post-war prefab housing projects borrowed from manufacturing strategies in the automotive industry to create houses that privileged light, ventilation, and openness against the feudal hierarchical principles perpetuated by the interior divisions found in traditional Japanese homes.

He is particularly known for his designs of the Tokyo Bunka Kaikan and the National Museum of Modern Art, as well as the Tokyo Kaijo Building, a 25-story tall skyscraper that became the flashpoint for the bikan ronso debates in 1970s Tokyo surrounding urban beautification and building height regulation. Many noted modernist architects began their careers in Maekawa's office, including Kenzō Tange and Miho Hamaguchi. His home (and one-time office), which he designed and completed in 1942, has been preserved and permanently installed in the Edo-Tokyo Open Air Architectural Museum.

== Career beginnings ==
=== Early life and education ===
Kunio Maekawa was born in 1905 in Niigata, Niigata Prefecture, in Japan. Maekawa came from a privileged background, and possessed samurai heritage on both sides of the family; his paternal grandfather was a retainer of the Ii clan, while his maternal relatives were retainers of the Tsugaru clan. He entered the prestigious First Tokyo Middle School in 1918, and in 1925 enrolled in the Department of Architecture at Tokyo Imperial University. Though architecture departments were established at Waseda University and Kyoto Imperial University in the same year, the latter institute's program remained the eminent and most influential environment for architectural study in Japan at the time. While the majority of his classmates were interested in the German Bauhaus during this period, Maekawa was drawn towards French artistic and architectural precedents, leading him to the work of Swiss–French architect Le Corbusier.

=== Career beginnings under Le Corbusier and Antonin Raymond ===
After graduating in 1928, he travelled to France to apprentice with Le Corbusier through the aid of his uncle Naotake Satō, a diplomat stationed in Paris with the Japanese delegation to the League of Nations. While in Paris, Maekawa primarily worked under Le Corbusier's brother Pierre Jeanneret, along with furniture and interior designer Charlotte Perriand and architect Alfred Roth. He participated in projects including the unbuilt Cité Mondiale (Mundaneum) center—an expansion upon the League of Nations headquarters in Geneva, Switzerland, and a utopian vision conceptualized to hold Paul Otlet's Universal Decimal Classification Collection—the Louise-Catherine barge project by Madeleine Zillhardt, and the Salvation Army branch in Paris.

In 1930 he returned to Japan and worked under Czech architect Antonin Raymond, a student of Frank Lloyd Wright, for five years. In 1935, Maekawa established his own office, Mayekawa Kunio Associates, and began to enter a number of architectural competitions sponsored by the Japanese Imperial Government. Later on, the firm served as a training ground for many Japanese architects who found success in the decades after the war, including Kenzō Tange and Toshihiko Kimura.

=== Maekawa House (1942) ===
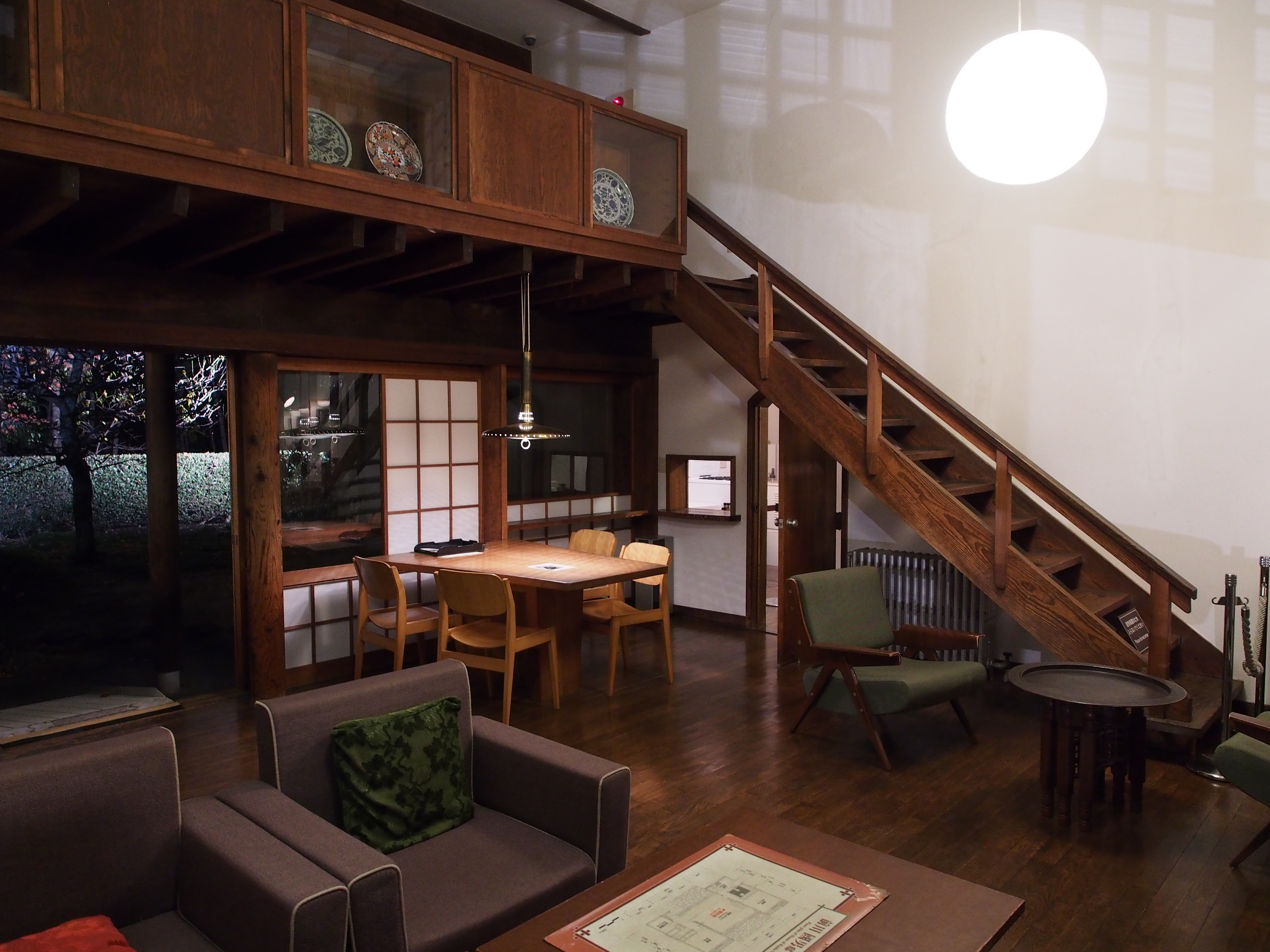
Double-height living room area featuring furnishings and lighting designed by Maekawa

The careful balance between traditional and modern design principles in Maekawa's early work is best illustrated by his own home, designed in 1942. The Maekawa House, constructed in wood, has been described as a critical node in his aesthetic development. By bringing piloti inside the house to create a two-story space, while integrating traditional grid formations in the deeply recessed windows, Maekawa deftly combined values borrowed from his European mentors with the vernacular building traditions of Japan. The original house, which was located in Kamiōsaki, Shinagawa, has been dismantled and relocated to the Edo-Tokyo Open Air Architectural Museum.

== Post-war projects (1945–1960s) ==
Owing to the limited resources available during the war, particularly steel, most of Maekawa's projects between 1937 and 1950 were constructed in wood. Within these restricted circumstances, Maekawa sought to innovate traditional building methods using modernist designs, as can be readily observed in his first post-war project, the Kinokuniya Bookstore in Shinjuku, Tokyo. The end of World War II also brought a close to the dominance of the Imperial Crown Style of architecture that had dictated much of the public construction during the early 20th century across the Japanese Empire. As a result, Maekawa and his fellow architects were primed to lean more liberally into their modernist impulses, which were no longer regarded as political threats to the Japanese state. Maekawa himself had, at times, been regarded as unpatriotic during the wartime years owing to his interest in Le Corbusier's non-historicist, proto-Brutalist concrete designs. No longer needing to modify their styles to meet the particular, limiting demands of the state in the post-war period, however, Maekawa and his modernist colleagues found greater success with both private and public commissions.

=== Kinokuniya Bookstore (1947) ===
His first major project in the post-war period, the Kinokuniya Bookstore in Shinjuku, Tokyo, embodied the spirit of urban renewal and cultural revival amidst the ravaged landscape of war. The two-story wood frame building featured a glass-clad facade facing the street, creating a stark visual and symbolic distinction between the bookshop and its surroundings, the latter of which still largely remained in states of ruin and disarray, dominated by the presence of black markets. At the time of its completion, the front area was still obscured by barracks and slums, and the entrance could only be accessed through a narrow path leading to the door. The glass facade filled the flat-roofed building with natural light, while Japanese Ōya stone (a material famously featured in Frank Lloyd Wright's design of the Imperial Hotel) was used in the entryway and staircase. Through the combination of vernacular materials and new design strategies borrowed from his European mentors, Maekawa began to concretize his neo-traditionalist approach to architecture, negotiating the needs of a modern Japanese society ravaged by the war, Imperial order, and American occupation while probing new ways of refashioning national identity through vernacular tropes and regionalist details.

Maekawa would also build Kinokuniya's 1964 steel-framed reinforced concrete headquarters and flagship store in Shinjuku, featuring a theatre, art gallery and various tenants in nine above ground stories, and two underground. As opposed to the earlier property, the new building was designed to be more welcoming and serve as a meeting place for the public. It still survives today and has been designated a Tokyo Historic Building in 2017.

=== Prefabrication Maekawa Ono San-in Kōgyō (PREMOS) (1946–1951) ===
In the wake of the widespread firebombing of cities across Japan perpetrated by the Allied forces between 1942 and 1945, many Japanese citizens were forced to construct makeshift shelters and barracks out of found materials. Within this context of wartime and post-war destruction, Maekawa capitalized on his interest in low-cost, prefabricated housing that had been brewing since his time in Le Corbusier's office. While Le Corbusier's concepts for affordable housing, such as the Dom-Ino House, failed to gain traction due to the high costs of actually producing them, Maekawa was inspired by the free plan advocated by Le Corbusier and the modernist visions for urban living and mass production he proposed.

Maekawa collaborated with aircraft factory San-in Kōgyō (whose owner, Yoshisuke Ayukawa was a client of Maekawa's during the war) and architectural engineer Kaoru Ono to create a production line of prefabricated housing, a project that was dubbed Prefabrication Maekawa Ono San-in Kōgyō, or PREMOS for short. PREMOS produced approximately 1,000 units, which were made almost exclusively out of wood and mostly used as residences for coal miners in rural Japan, although a few were commissioned as private urban homes by clients and friends of Maekawa. None of the PREMOS houses survive today. The houses were supported by L-shaped walls located at the corners of the home, had no columns, and used a collection of floor, ceiling, and partition panels that were all manufactured in the factory before being sent to the building site, where they could be fully constructed within a week. Though PREMOS never reached widespread success owing largely to the actual expenses of the construction and the decline of coal mining in the late 1960s (an industry that had peaked during the U.S. occupation due to the operating needs of national industries, particularly steel), the modernist principles demonstrated in the project—combined dining and kitchen spaces, the Western-style living room, the flat-roofed structure, and the mass-production methods—emblematized the flux of the postwar years and allowed Maekawa to test out ideas borrowed from his time working with European architects within a Japanese context.

=== Tokyo Bunka Kaikan (1961) ===
One of his best-known works, the Tokyo Bunka Kaikan (Tokyo Metropolitan Festival Hall) located in Ueno Park, Taitō, was commissioned in commemoration of the 500th anniversary of the establishment of the Tokyo Metropolitan Government in 1956. The building contains a main concert hall, used for ballet, opera, and other large concerts, a smaller recital hall, rehearsal rooms and a music library. The 21,000-square foot complex was designed in conjunction with architects Junzo Sakakura and Takamasa Yoshizaka, both of whom had also apprenticed under Le Corbusier. The building works in harmony with Le Corbusier's National Museum of Western Art (1959), which the three architects had also worked on, and the Japan Art Academy (1958), both also located within Ueno Park. The three complexes are connected by an extended terrace, and the reinforced concrete and formalist cues echo Le Corbusier's structure without fully replicating its visual cues. The National Museum of Western Art is Le Corbusier's only building in East Asia, featuring an austere concrete facade consisting of a rhythmically organized rectangular panels that become compressed as the eye moves upward, adding to the illusion of height that is further pronounced by the pilotis in the interior and exterior of the building.

The Tokyo Bunka Kaikan features a wide-set cornice supported by square pilotis, which continue into the interior of the large entrance hall. The upturned eaves are reminiscent of Le Corbusier's Notre-Dame du Haut, while the wooden acoustic panels of the 2,300-seat main auditorium feature organic, cloud-like forms, counterbalancing the heft and linearity of the concrete details. The smaller Recital Hall, which seats 649 individuals and is used for chamber music performances and smaller recitals, has a sound-reflecting panel that resembles a folding screen hung vertically, as well as sound-diffusing concrete niches that similarly call to mind paper cutouts and folds. Both interior elements were designed by sculptor Masayuki Nagare. The forms of the two halls extend above the level of the roof, creating dynamic hexagonal and triangular prisms that enliven the rectilinear structure.

== Late career projects (1960s–1980s) ==
Maekawa took on a series of large-scale civic, cultural, and corporate projects during the latter half of his career, including the main building of the National Diet Library (1968) (the annex, also designed by Maekawa Kunio Associates, was completed in 1986), the Steel Pavilion at Expo '70 (1970), Saitama Prefectural Museum of History and Folklore (1971), Tokio Marine & Nichido Fire Insurance Building (1974), Tokyo Metropolitan Art Museum (1975), and the Miyagi Museum of Art (1981).

In contrast to his younger colleagues such as Kenzō Tange and those associated with the Metabolism movement, Maekawa displayed a reticence towards the megastructures and biomorphic forms that approached the rapid growth of technological modernity with exuberance, and expressed concerns over the capacity of machines to undermine human skill and artistry in architectural labor. At the same time, he maintained a consistently apolitical stance throughout the course of his career, in contrast to both his mentor Le Corbusier and other contemporaries in Japan—a decision that was surely driven by personal choice, but as Jonathan Reynolds suggests, also allowed him to remain in the good graces of the academy, authorities and other stakeholders who continued to provide him with large-scale commissions that played a central role in the transformation of urban landscapes in postwar Japan.

=== Use of uchikomi (cast-in-place) tiling ===
Many of Maekawa's projects from the 1960s onward feature extensive use of glazed tiles on facades and flooring, as seen in examples such as the Saitama Hall, the Saitama Prefectural Museum of History and Folklore, and in the annex of the National Diet Library, where the distinctive blue tile cladding provides a visual contrast against the bold concrete exterior of the main building and illustrates the architect's aesthetic developments over the course of his post-war career. During the later years of his career, Maekawa began to shift away from relying primarily on exposed concrete as the post-war decades had begun to reveal the vulnerabilities of the material to weathering and discoloration. He pioneered the use of uchikomi ("cast-in-place") tiles, which were set within wooden frames through which concrete was poured in, became a signature feature of late-career projects. The tiles provide structural support and textural dimension, while creating exteriors that are more resistant to deterioration. During his later years, Maekawa cited an increasing affinity towards William Morris' thinkings on material integrity and the value of aesthetically compelling functional goods, and his experimentation with different tiled facades and floors illustrates his keen engagement with the aesthetic dimensions of contemporary industrial production.

=== Tokio Marine & Nichido Building and the bikan ronso debate (1974) ===
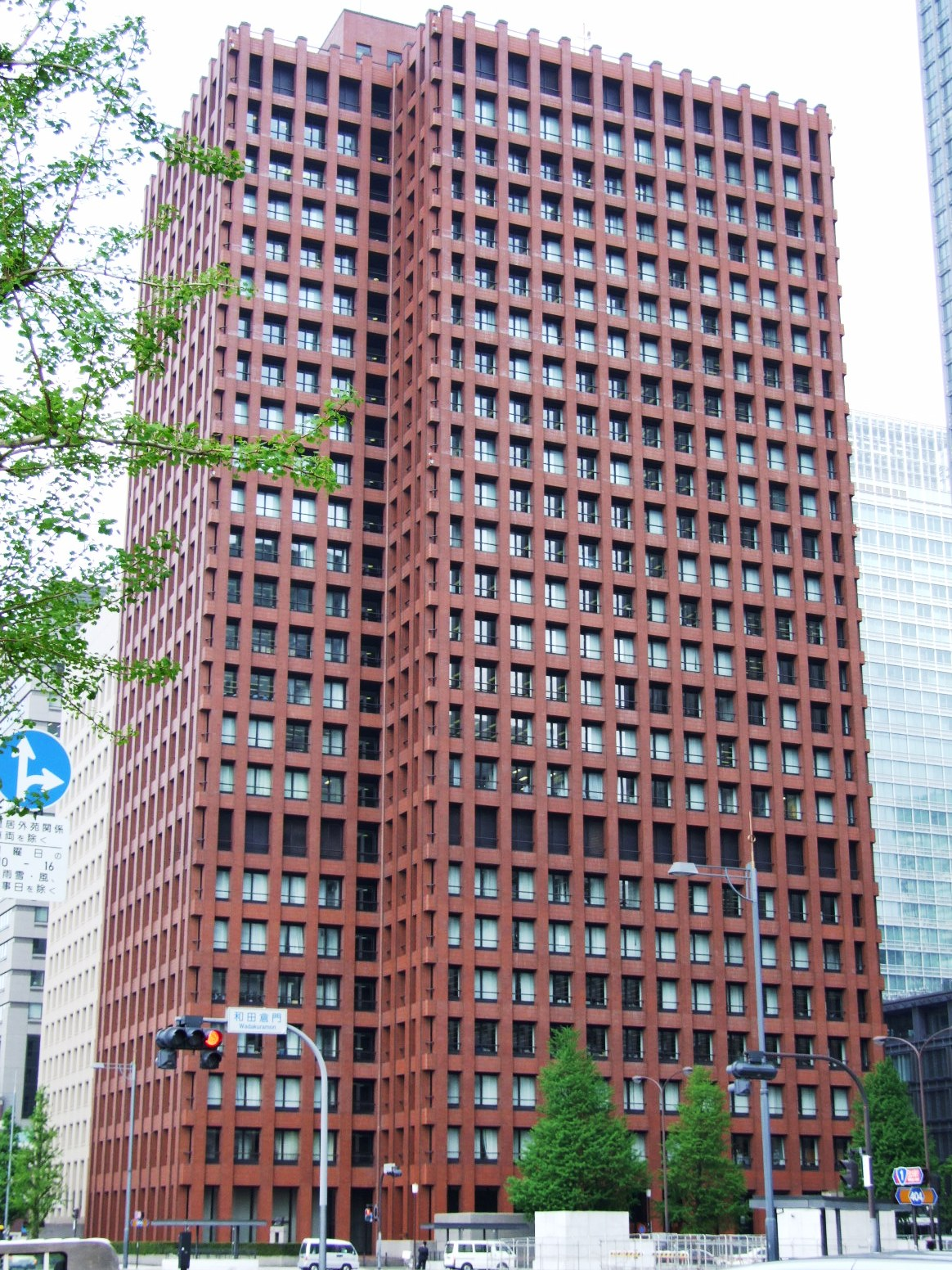
Skyscraper of the Tokio Marine & Nichido Fire Insurance Building (1974)

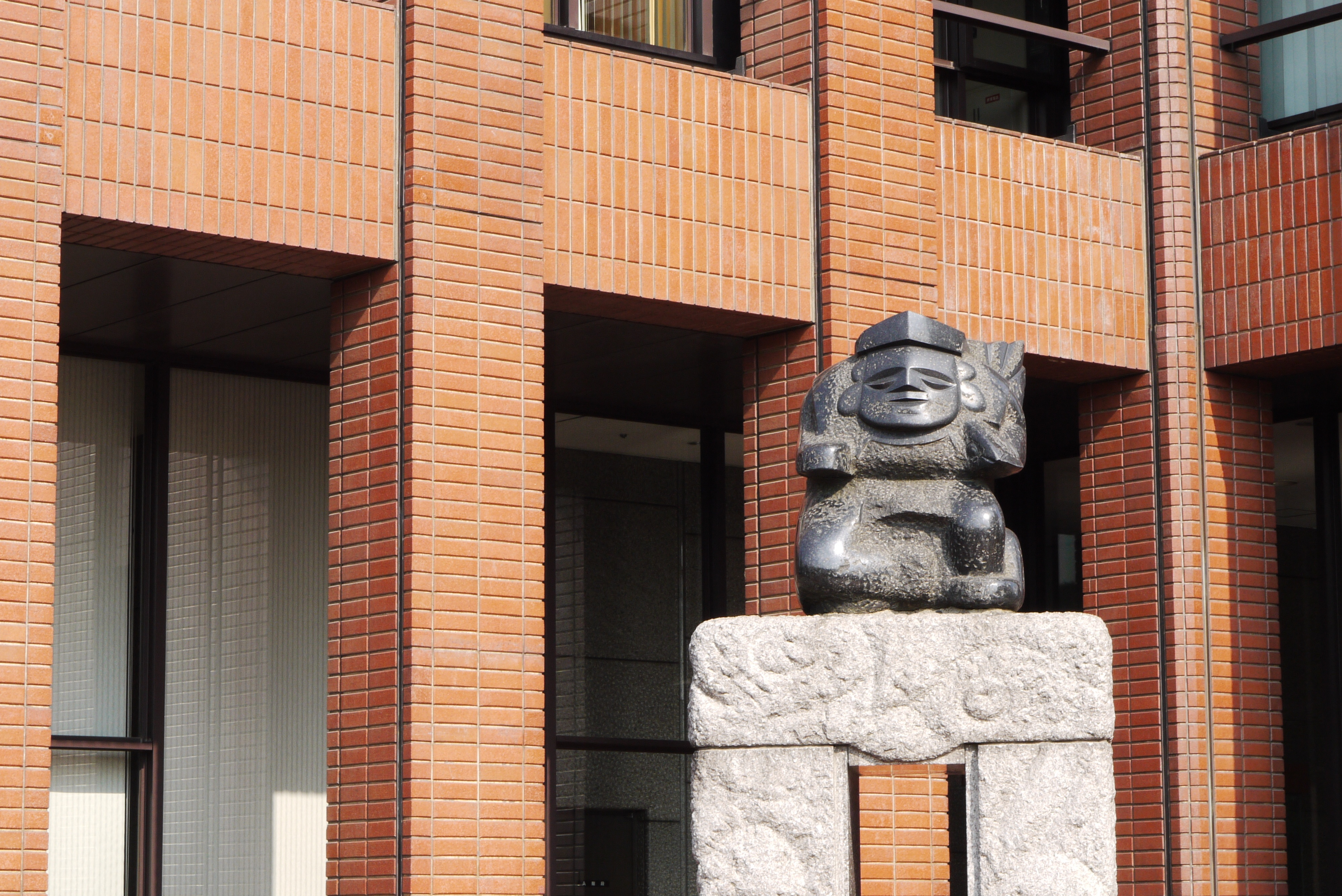
View of tiles on the exterior of the Tokio Marine & Nichido Fire Insurance Building

As industrialization and economic growth progressed rapidly and urban centers swelled in size throughout the 1960s, the Tokyo skyline became increasingly punctuated by high-rise skyscrapers that signified the onset of a new era after the post-war period. In 1965, the Tokio Marine & Nichido Fire Insurance Company announced that they would be constructing a new headquarters building in Marunouchi, Chiyoda, in proximity to the Imperial Palace of Tokyo. Maekawa was commissioned for the project, which was slated to have 30 floors and stand 127 meters high. Though the scale seems insignificant today considering Tokyo's high-rise laden skyline, buildings in the surrounding area at the time were limited to a height of just 31 meters due to the requirements of the prewar "aesthetic district" (bikan chiku) designation and the Building Standards Act enacted in 1950. In 1948, however, the bikan chiku system was suspended after its purposes were deemed unnecessary with the onset of the Building Standards Act (municipalities could later pursue this designation provided they establish a separate ordinance specific to their area).

Maekawa's design made use of colossal orders running up the length of the structure, which emphasized the verticality of the building and suppressed the windows to provide an illusion of greater height. This facade, along with the terracotta tiles that clad the building, nod to Louis Sullivan's Wainwright Building, as if to link Maekawa's break with urban tradition in Tokyo to the pioneering structure of the skyscraper genre.

Although the Tokyo Metropolitan Construction Review Board tried to shut down Tokio Marine & Nichido Fire Insurance Company's proposal and revive the aesthetic district designation in order to protect the area, lack of consensus among the municipal assembly prevented the plan from materializing, allowing Tokio Marine & Nichido Fire Insurance Company to move forward to with the project. The widely publicized back-and-forth surrounding the construction created what was termed the "aesthetics debate" (bikan ronso) as politicians, architects, and planners engaged in heated discourse over the symbolic and visual stakes of the proposed building. Dissenters, such as Tokyo Governor Ryokichi Minobe and Prime Minister Eisaku Sato, argued that the modernist building would disrupt the skyline and pollute the aesthetics of the Imperial Palace, its looming presence a sign of disrespect to the Imperial family situated in its shadow. Those in favor insisted that aesthetics should not be subject to government regulation, and that such attempts to mandate the visage of the city were antiquated.

After a year of discussion, the Construction Review Board and Tokio Marine & Nichido Fire Insurance Company settled on a compromise: the building would be shrunk to a height of 99.7 meters and 25 stories. No significant changes to the appearance of the building were made, as Maekawa's design consisted of two rectangular volumes, flat on all sides, with modular windows across the entirety of the facade, making the process of removing floors a relatively simple revision. This rendered the debate around aesthetics somewhat moot, as the change in height essentially served as a symbolic gesture (creating a 100 meter limit that would later be surpassed by many buildings in Marunouchi, Chiyoda) and effected little noticeable change in the appearance of the building and its relation to the palace. Nevertheless, the building and the ensuing debate transformed the discourse surrounding urbanization, economic growth, and aesthetics in the Japanese capital, setting the stage for the dozens of skyscrapers that would be constructed in the decades to follow.

In 2021, the Tokio Marine & Nichido Fire Insurance Company announced that Maekawa's building would be demolished and replaced with an even taller structure designed by Renzo Piano Building Workshop and Mitsubishi Jisho Sekkei, slated to be completed in 2028. The building's fate falls in line with a trend befalling numerous other skyscrapers built in the same era, such as the World Trade Center in Tokyo.

== Selected projects ==
- 1932 Kimura Industrial Laboratory, Hirosaki, Aomori Prefecture
- 1936 Hinamoto Hall
- 1938 Dairen Town Hall
- 1942 Maekawa House, Edo-Tokyo Open Air Architectural Museum, Koganei Park, Tokyo
- 1952 Nippon Sogo Bank, Tokyo, Tokyo Metropolitan Area
- 1954 Kanagawa Prefectural Library and Music Hall, Yokohama, Kanagawa Prefecture
- 1955 The International House of Japan, Tokyo (with Junzo Sakakura and Junzo Yoshimura)
- 1955 Okayama Prefectural Office, Okayama, Okayama Prefecture
- 1956 Fukushima Education Center, Fukushima, Fukushima Prefecture
- 1959 Harumi flats, Harumi, Tokyo
- 1959 Setagaya Community Centre, Setagaya, Tokyo
- 1960 Kyoto Kaikan, Kyoto, Kyoto Prefecture
- 1961 Tokyo Bunka Kaikan, Ueno, Tokyo
- 1964 Hayashibara Museum of Art, Okayama
- 1964 Kinokuniya Building, Shinjuku, Tokyo
- 1966 Saitama Cultural Centre, Saitama, Saitama Prefecture
- 1970 Steel Pavilion, Expo '70, Osaka, Osaka Prefecture
- 1974 Tokio Marine & Nichido Fire Insurance Building, Tokyo
- 1975 Tokyo Metropolitan Art Museum, Tokyo
- 1976 Kumamoto Prefecture Museum of Art, Kumamoto, Kumamoto Prefecture
- 1977 Museum of East Asian Art, Cologne, West Germany
- 1978 Yamanashi Prefecture Museum of Art, Kōfu, Yamanashi Prefecture
- 1979 Fukuoka Art Museum, Fukuoka, Fukuoka Prefecture
- 1979 National Museum of Western Art, Ueno Park, Taitō, Tokyo (with Junzo Sakakura and Takamasa Yoshizaka)
- 1981 The Miyagi Museum of Art, Sendai, Miyagi Prefecture
- 1982 Kumamoto Prefectural Theater, Kumamoto

=== Gallery ===
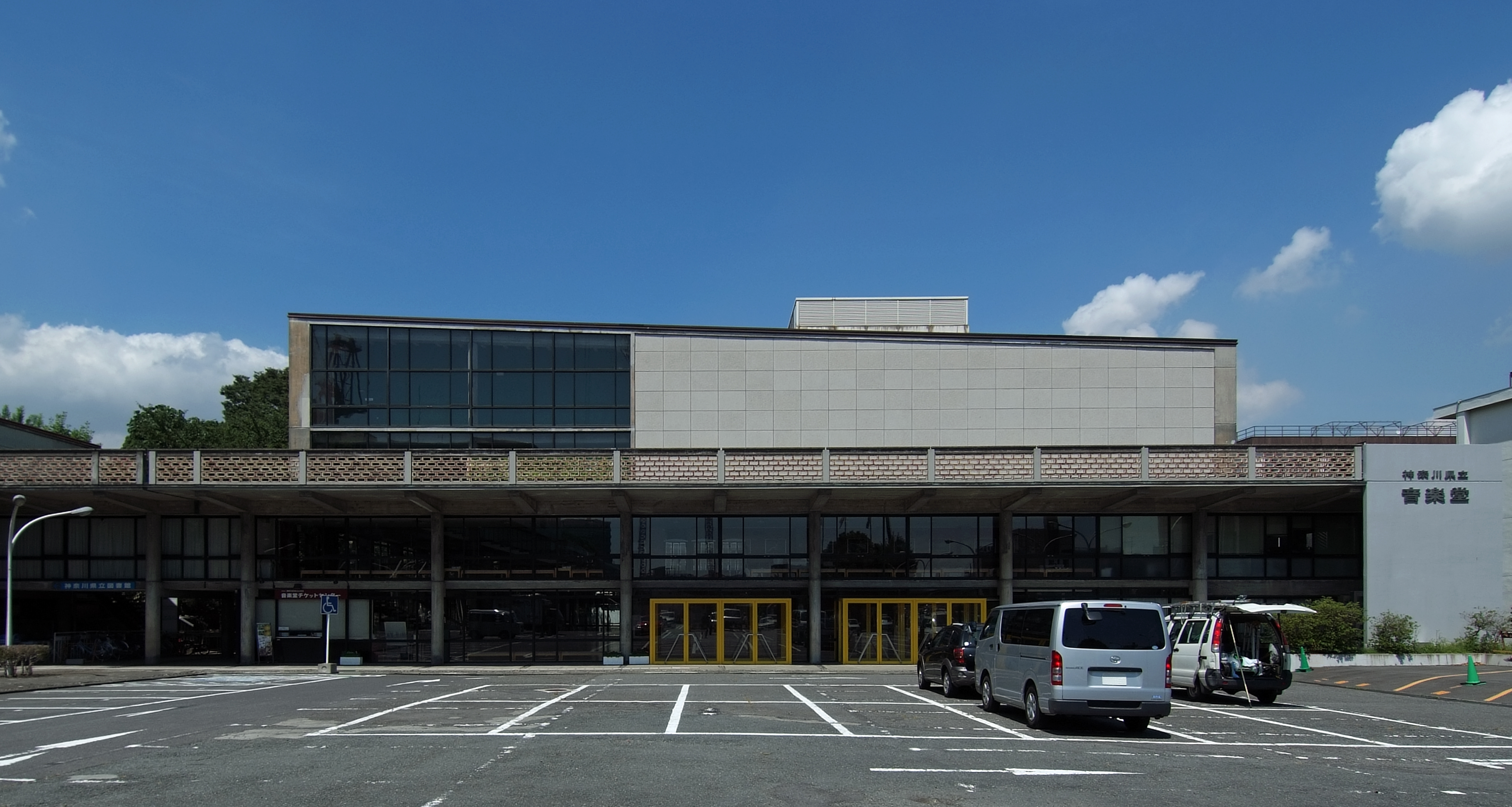
Kanagawa Prefectural Library and Music Hall, Yokohama (1954)

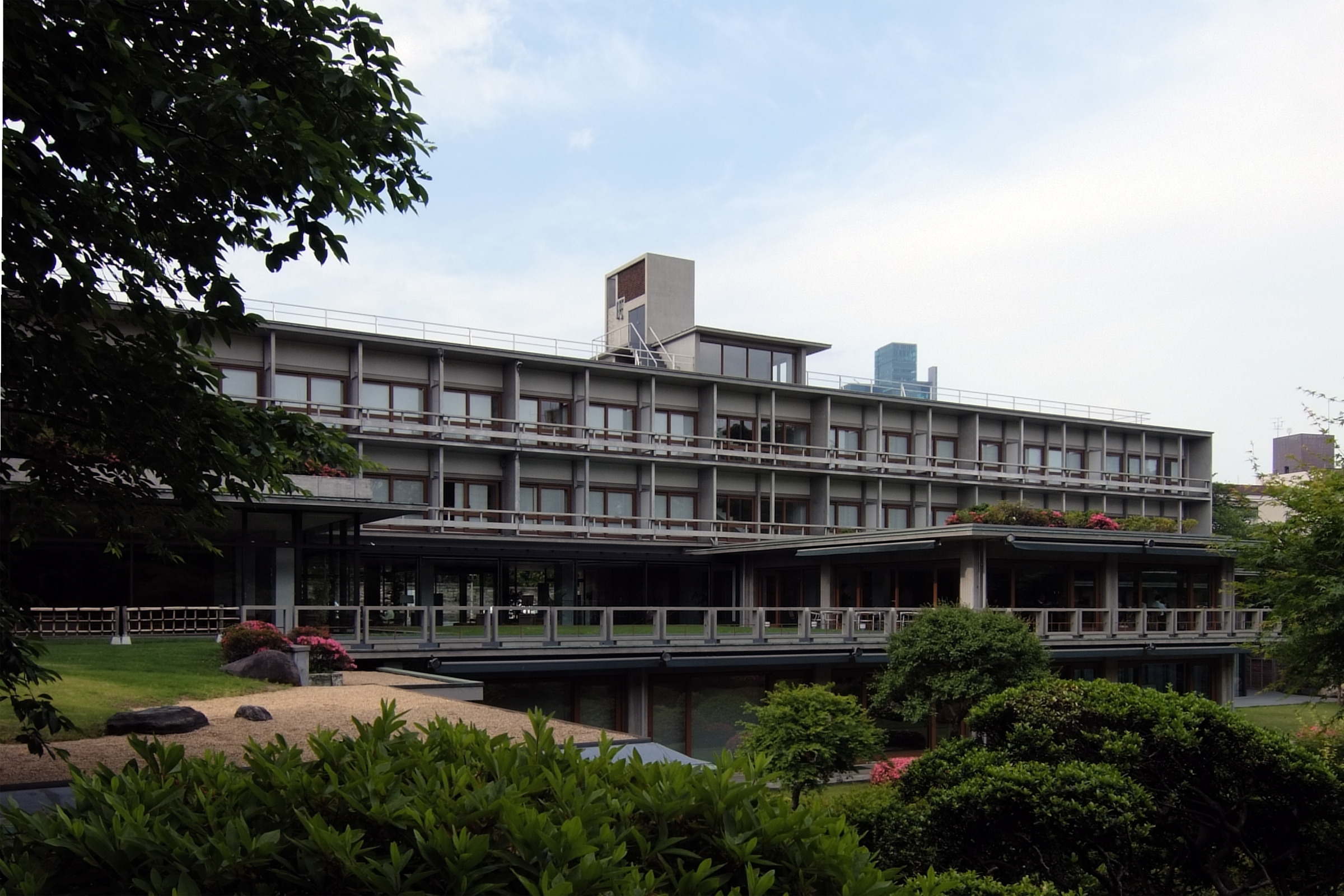
International House of Japan, Minato, Tokyo (1955)

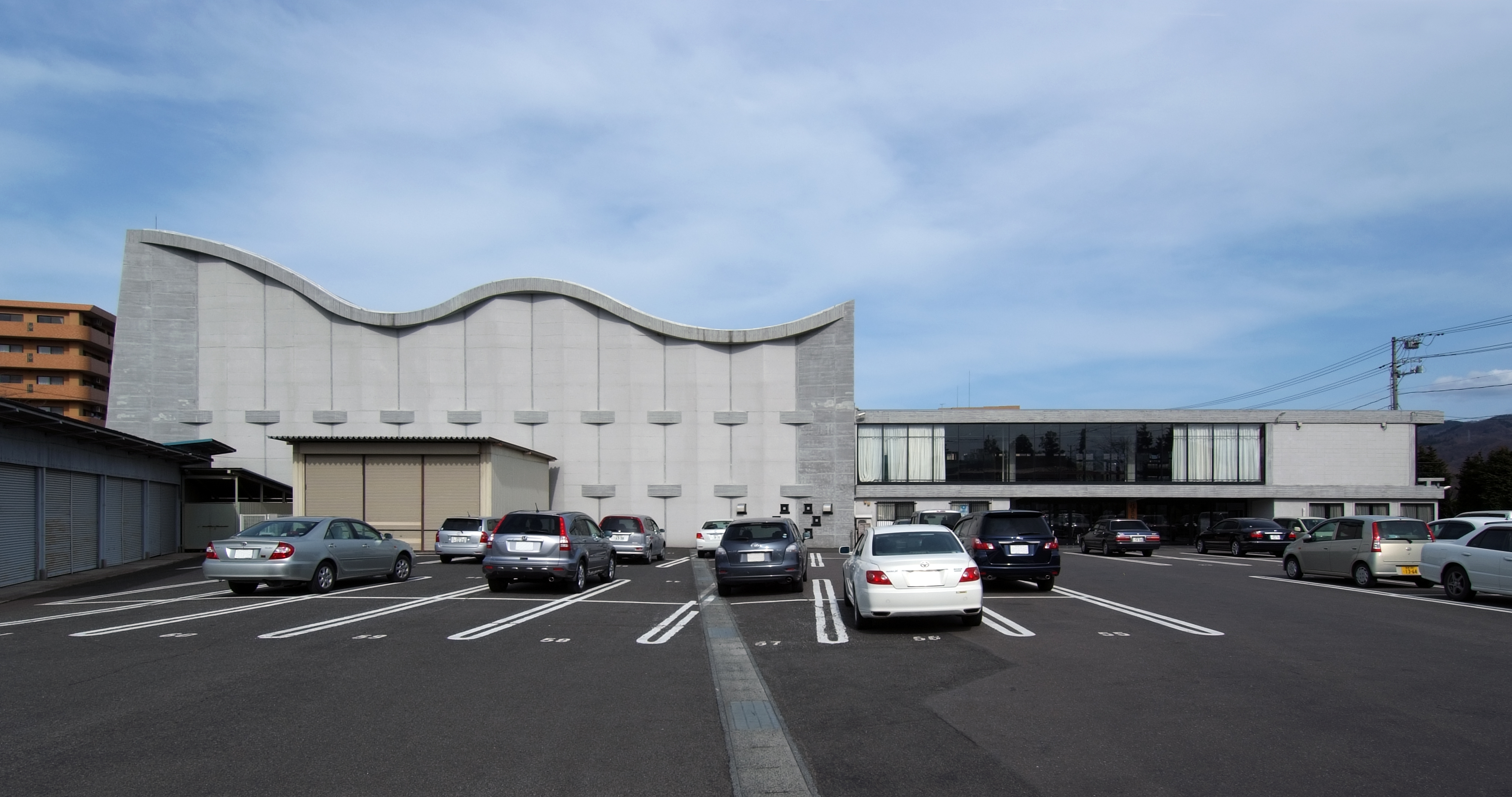
Fukushima Education Center, Fukushima (1956)

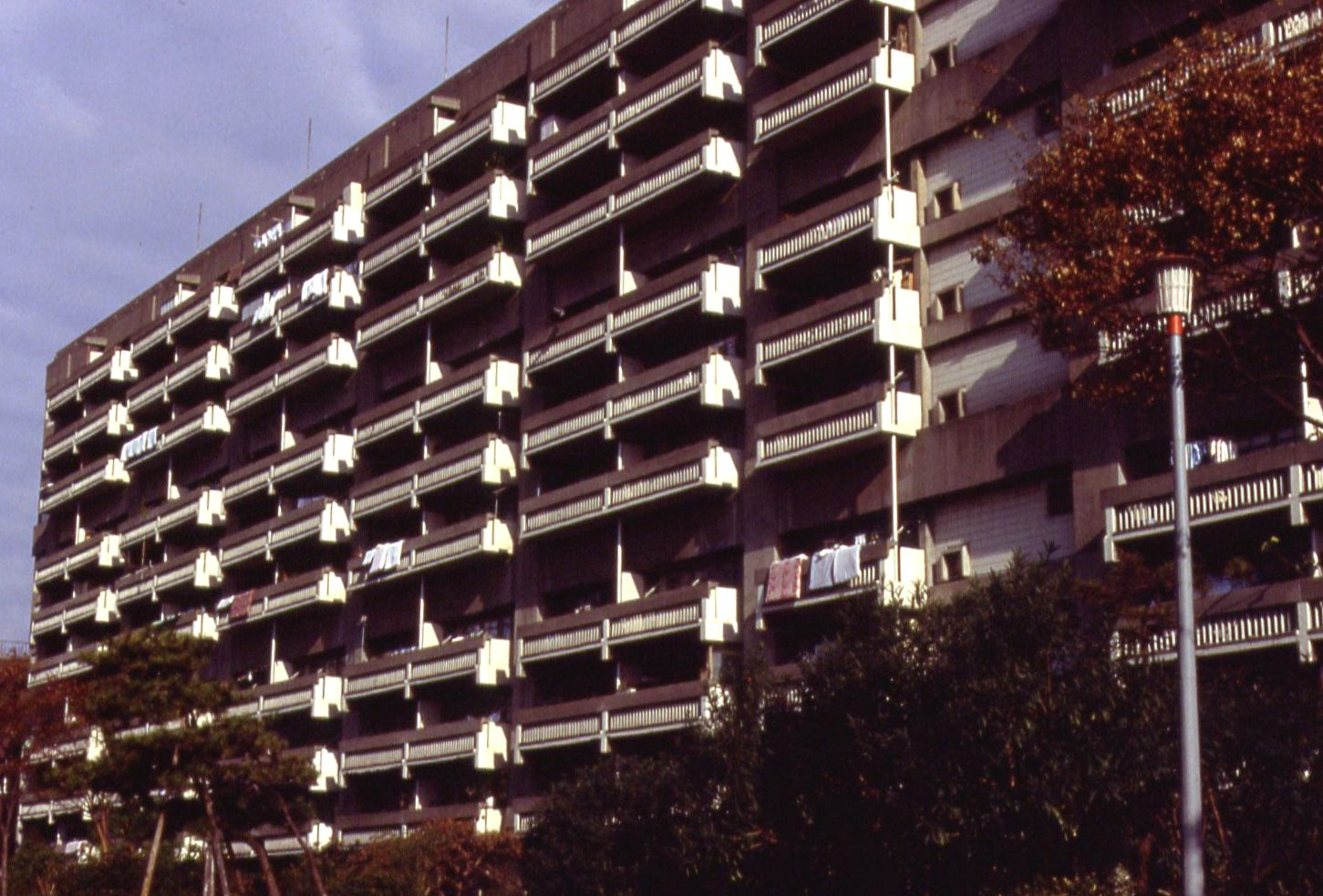
Apartments in Harumi, Tokyo (1958)

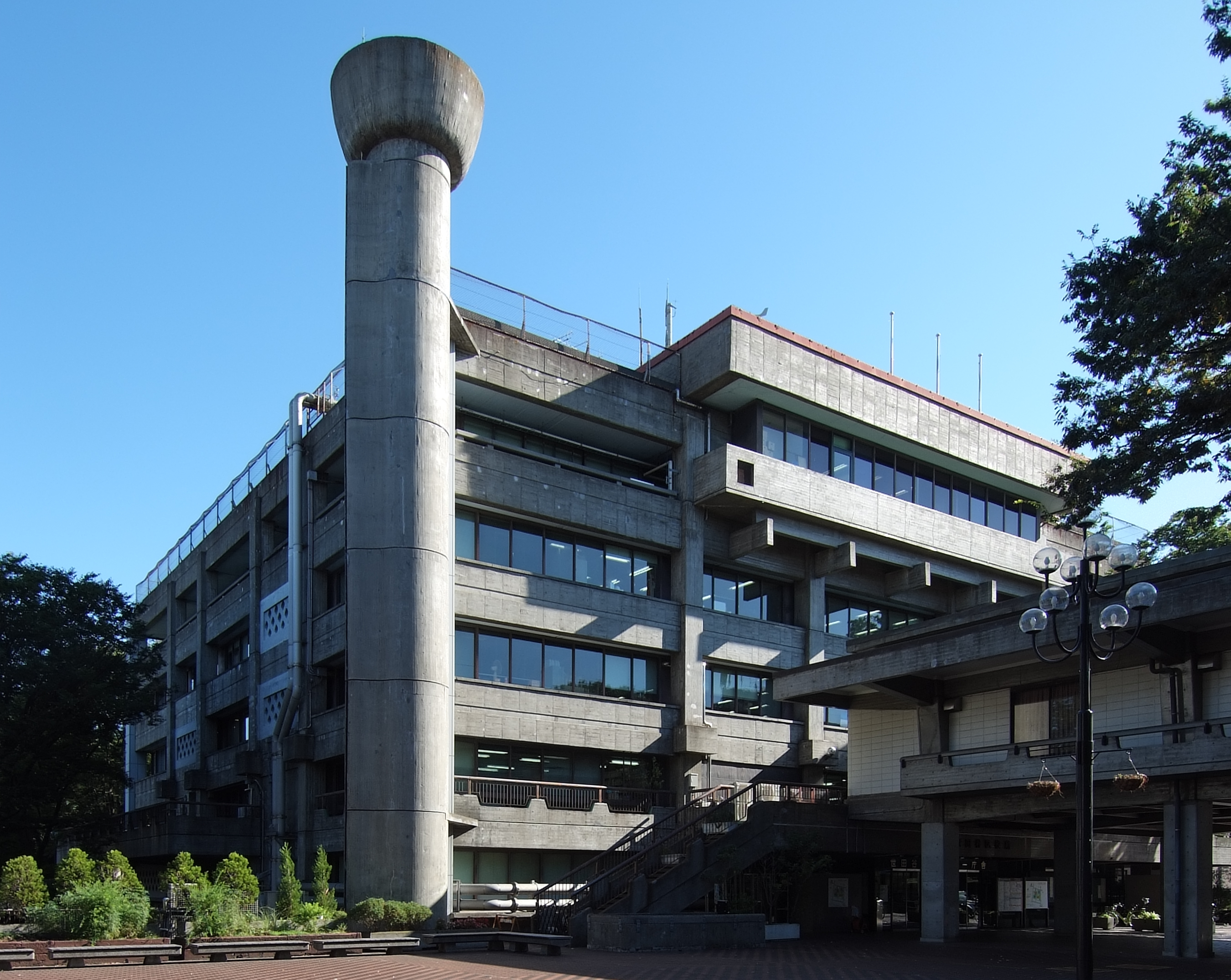
Setagaya City Hall (ward office), Setagaya, Tokyo

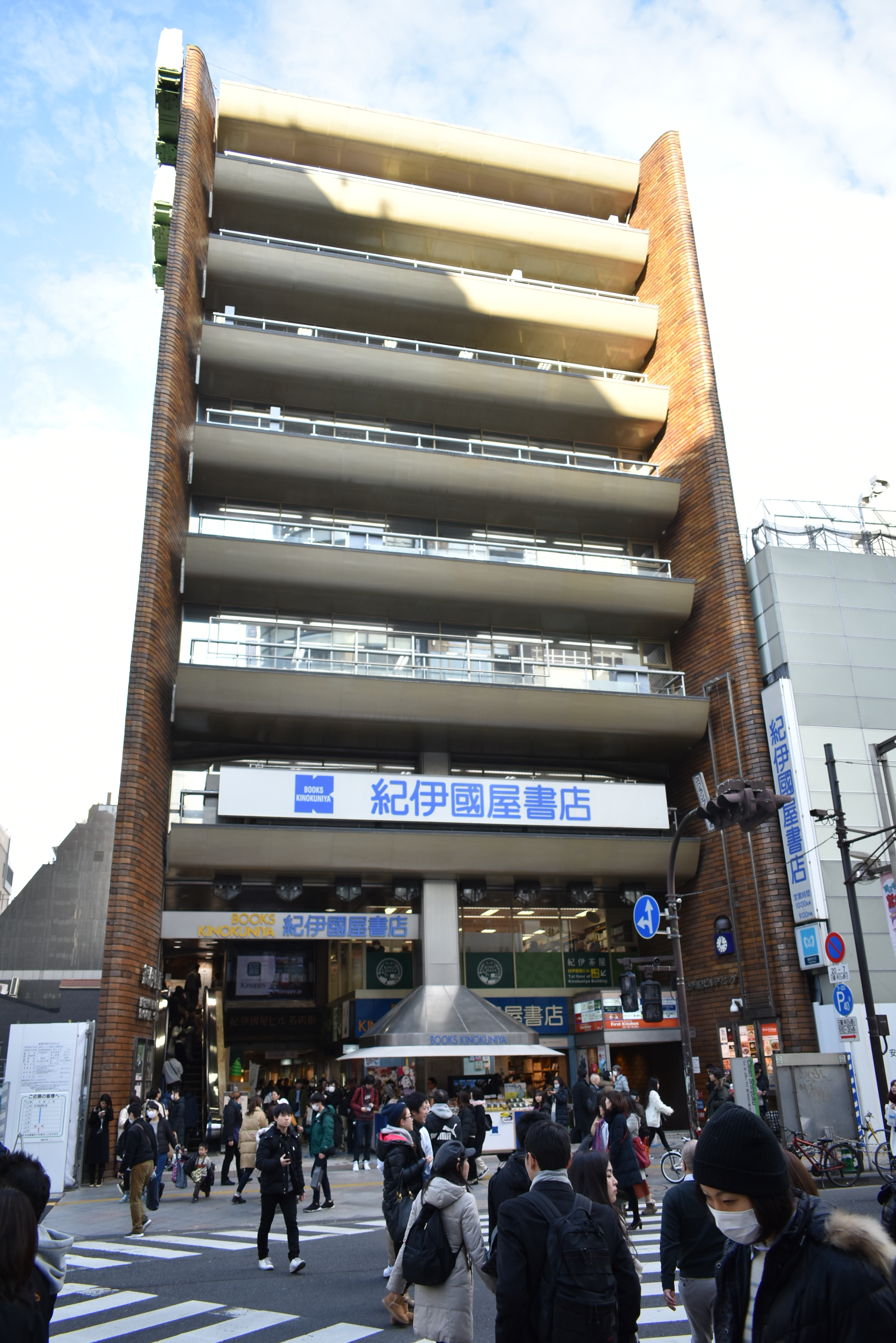
Kinokunya Building, Shinjuku (1964)

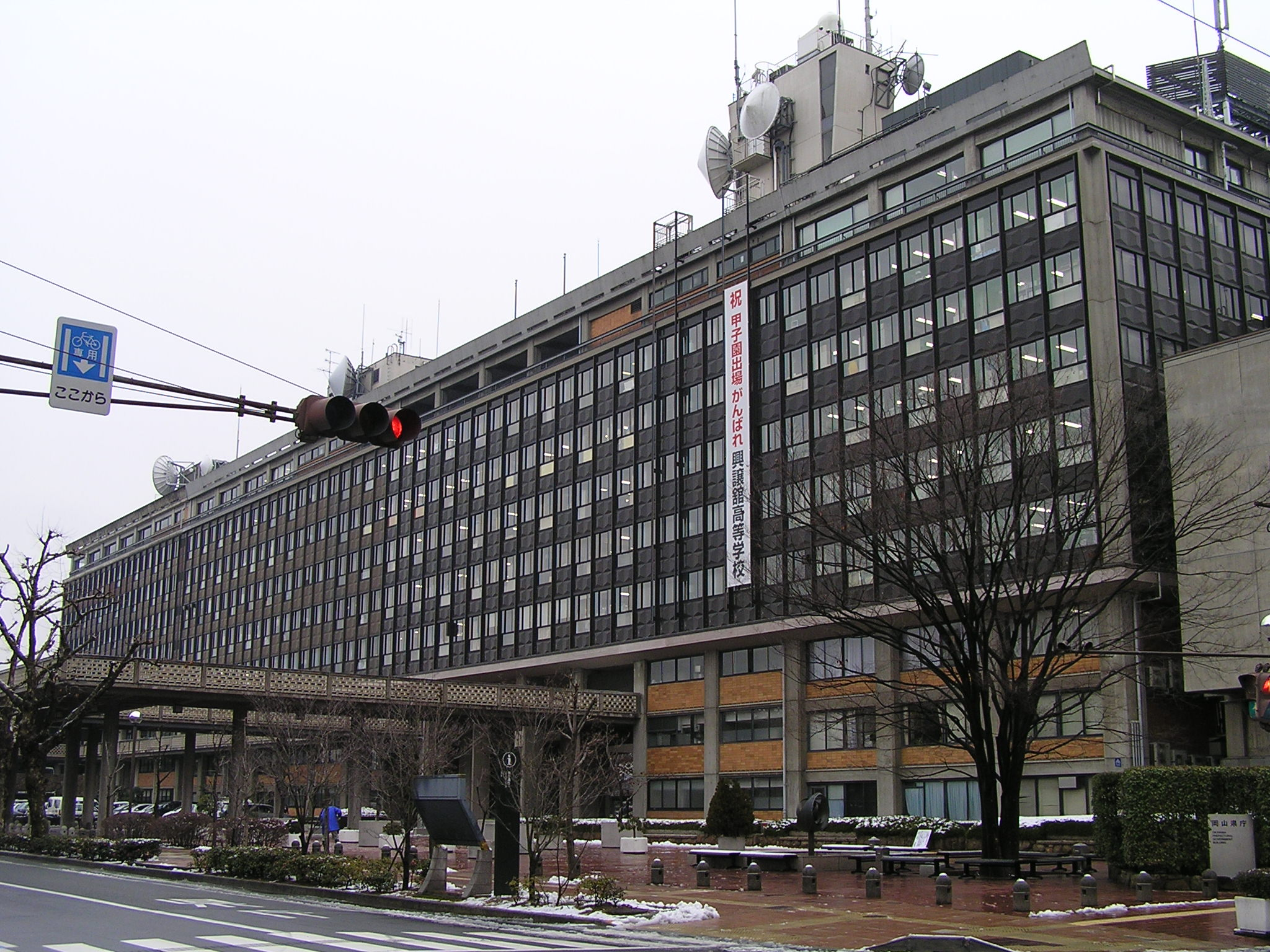
Okayama Prefectural Government Office (main building), Okayama

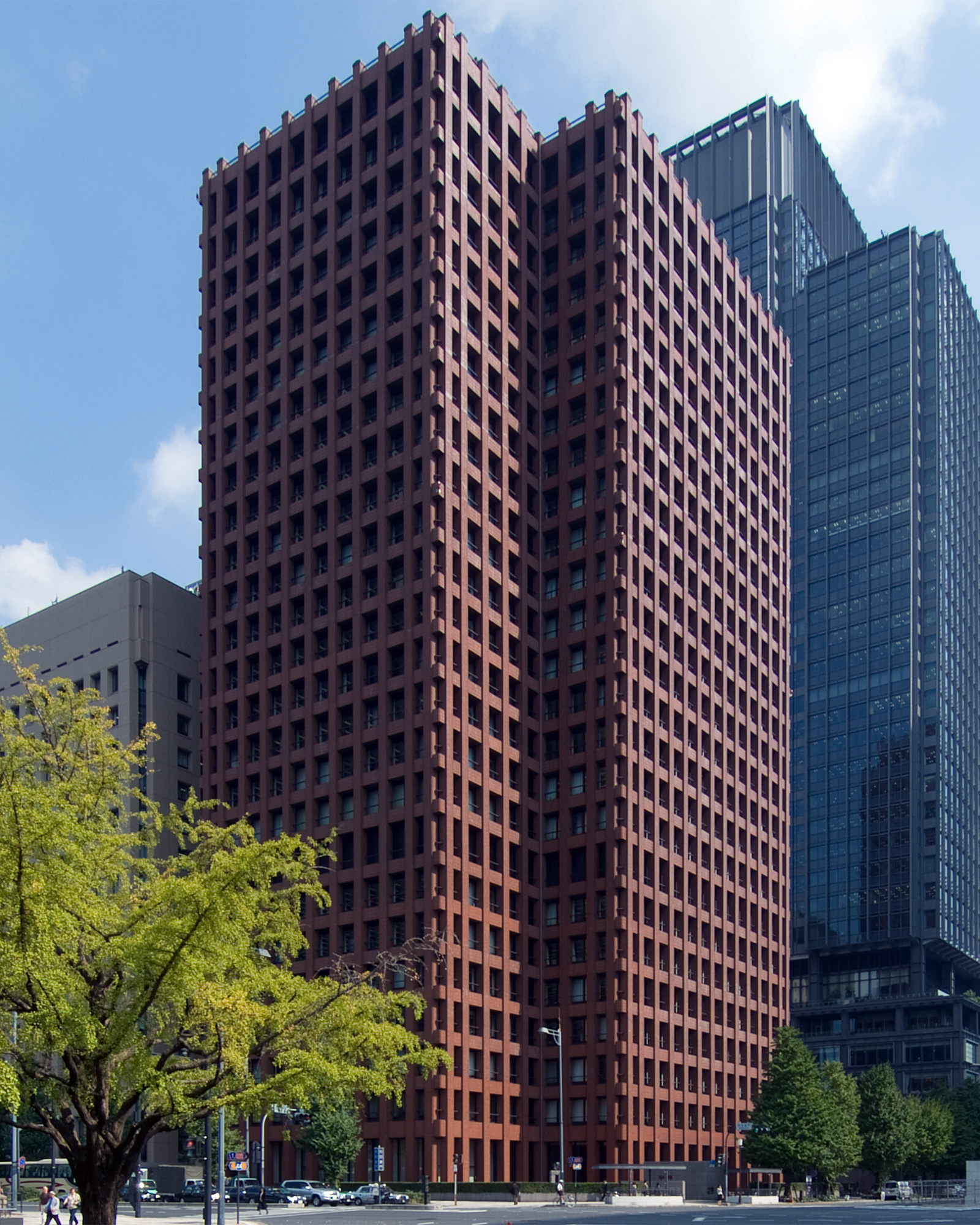
Tokio Marine & Nichido Fire Insurance Building (head office), Marunouchi, Tokyo (1974)

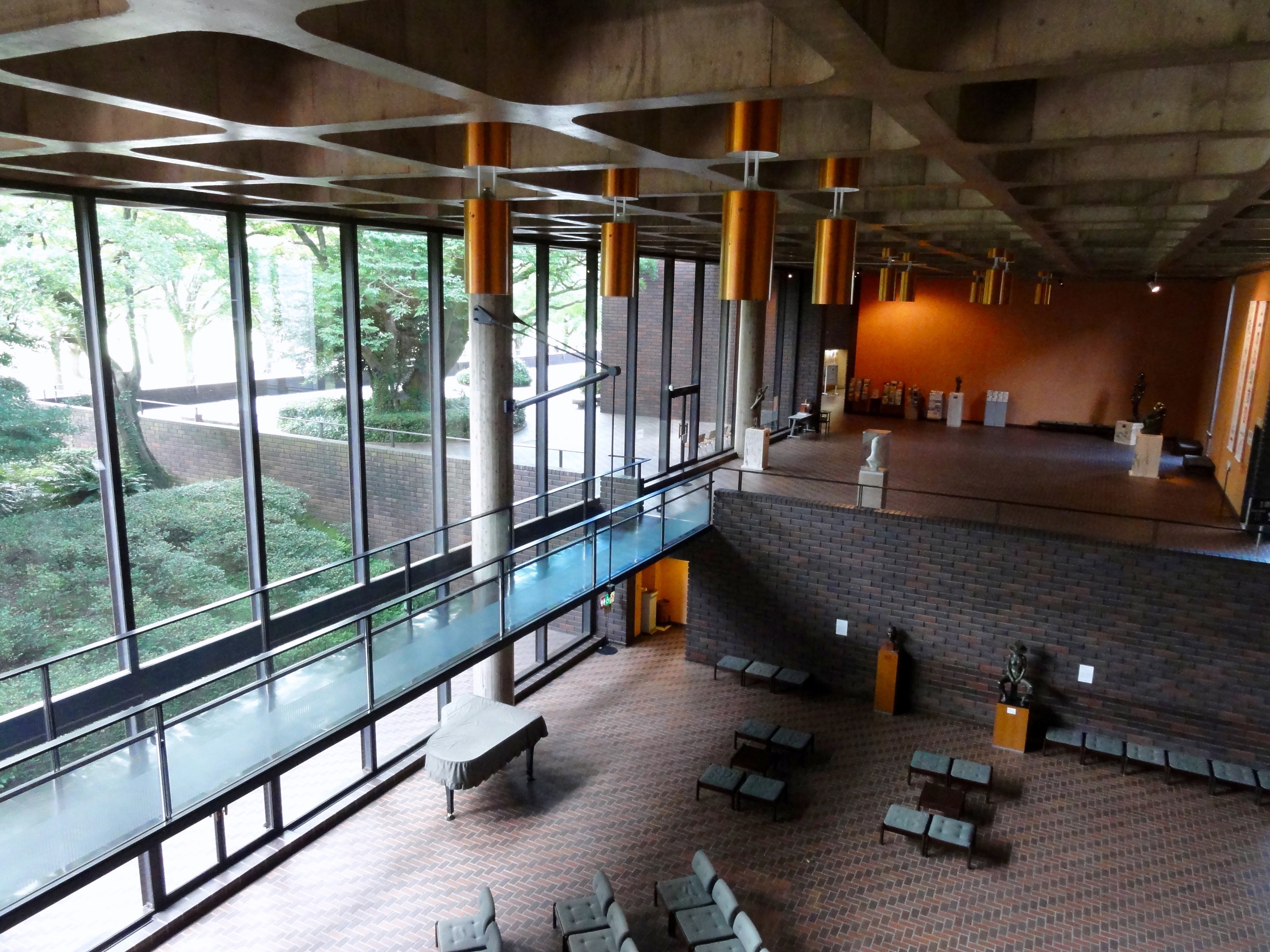
Kumamoto Prefectural Museum of Art, Chūō-ku, Kumamoto (1976)

== Honors and awards ==
- 1953, '55, '56, '61, '62, '66 Prize of the Architectural Institute of Japan (Tokyo)
- 1959 Decorated as Commander of the Order of Vasa (Sweden)
- 1962 Asahi Prize (Osaka)
- 1963 UIA Auguste Perret Prize (France)
- 1967 Decorated as Commander of the Order of the Lion of Finland (Finland)
- 1968 Grand Prize of the Architectural Institute of Japan (Tokyo)
- 1972 Mainichi Art Prize (Osaka)
- 1974 Prize of Japan Art Academy (Tokyo)
- 1978 Decorated as Officer of the Ordre national du Mérite (France)

== Bibliography ==
- Kumagai, Takaaki (2018). "Maekawa Kunio: Prefabrication and Wooden Modernism 1945–1951" (PDF). Dearquitectura. 22 (22). Bogotá, Colombia: Department of Architecture at the University of the Andes: 36–45. doi:10.18389/DEARQ22.2018.03. ISSN 2215-969X.
- Reynolds, Jonathan M. (2001). Maekawa Kunio and the Emergence of Japanese Modernist Architecture. Berkeley and Los Angeles, U.S.: University of California Press. ISBN 9780520214958.
- Tsukano, Michiya; Sendai, Shoichiro (2018). Lu, Xilin (ed.). "Development of the Esplanade by Kunio Maekawa". Journal of Asian Architecture and Building Engineering. 17 (2). Tokyo, Japan: Taylor & Francis on behalf of the Architectural Institute of Japan, the Architectural Institute of Korea, and the Architectural Society of China: 213–219. doi:10.3130/jaabe.17.213. ISSN 1347-2852.
