= Journal of Asian Architecture and Building Engineering =

Academic journal

- Discipline: Architecture
- Language: English
- Edited by: Xilin Lu

Publication details
- History: 1886–present
- Publisher: Taylor & Francis for the Architectural Institute of Japan, the Architectural Institute of Korea, and the Architectural Society of China (Japan, Korea, China)
- Frequency: Bimonthly
- Open access: Yes
- License: CC BY/CC BY-NC
- Impact factor: 1.3 (2022)

Standard abbreviations
- ISO 4: J. Asian Archit. Build. Eng.

Indexing
- ISSN: 1346-7581 (print); 1347-2852 (web)
- LCCN: 2018201785

Links
- Journal homepage; Online access; Online archive

The Journal of Asian Architecture and Building Engineering is a bimonthly peer-reviewed open access academic journal published by Taylor & Francis on behalf of the Architectural Institute of Japan, the Architectural Institute of Korea and the Architectural Society of China. The editor-in-chief is Xilin Lu (Tongji University). It was established by the Architectural Institute of Japan in 1886.

== Abstracting and indexing ==
The journal is abstracted and indexed in:

- Arts & Humanities Citation Index
- Directory of Open Access Journals
- Ei Compendex
- Index Islamicus
- ProQuest databases
- Science Citation Index Expanded
- Scopus

According to the Journal Citation Reports, the journal has a 2022 impact factor of 1.3.
