= Junzō =

- Gender: Male

Origin
- Origin: Japanese
- Meaning: Different meanings depending on the kanji used

Junzō, Junzo, Junzoh or Junzou (written: 順三, 純三, 準三, 潤三 or 淳三) is a masculine Japanese given name. Notable people with the name include:

- Junzo Inohara (猪原 淳三; born 1910), Japanese field hockey player
- Junzo Nishigami (西上 順三; born 1989), Japanese figure skater
- Junzō Okudaira (奥平 純三; born 1949), Japanese communist
- Junzo Sakakura (坂倉 準三; 1901–1969), Japanese architect
- Junzo Shono (庄野 潤三; 1921–2009), Japanese writer
- Junzo Yamamoto (山本 順三; born 1954), Japanese politician
- Junzō Yoshimura (吉村 順三; 1908–1997), Japanese architect
