= Junzō Yoshimura =

Japanese architect (1908–1997)

- Born: September 8, 1908; Honjo, Edo, Japan
- Died: April 11, 1997 (aged 88); Tokyo, Japan
- Education: Tokyo Fine Arts College
- Occupation: Architect

Junzō Yoshimura (吉村 順三, Yoshimura Junzō; September 7, 1908 – April 11, 1997) was a Japanese architect.

== Early career ==
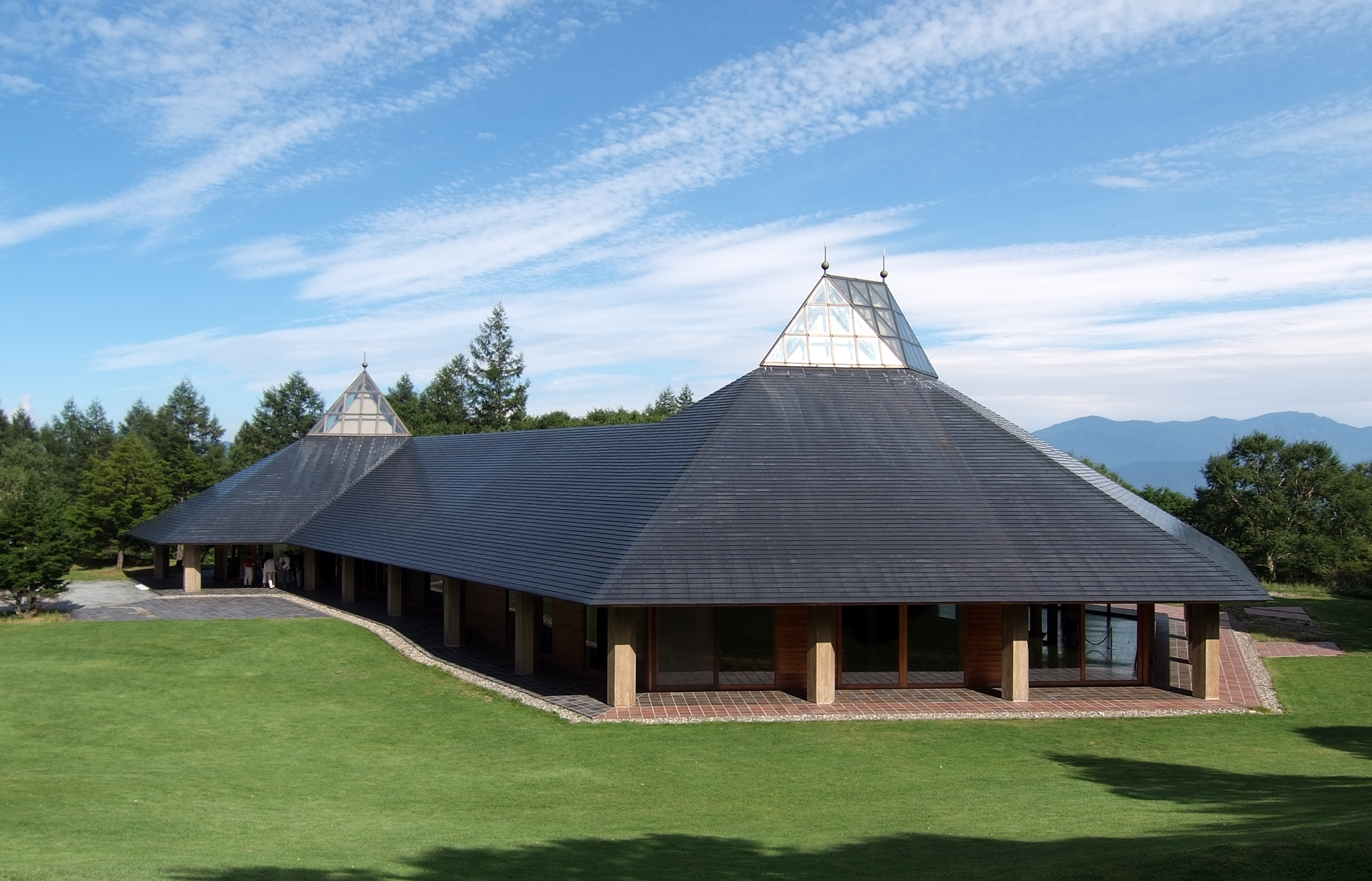
The Hall of Chamber Music, Yatsugatake, at Minamimaki, Nagano, 1988

Yoshimura dated his desire to become an architect to the day he first entered Frank Lloyd Wright's Imperial Hotel in Tokyo, shortly after the Kanto earthquake of 1923. "“It was the first time that I felt emotional when faced with architecture. I said to my myself, this really shows the power of space. I felt that architecture was something extraordinary. It’s certainly the main reason I became an architect.”

In December 1928, while a student at Tokyo's Fine Arts College, Yoshimura began part-time work at the architectural office of Antonin Raymond. After his graduation in 1931 he became a full-time member of the staff. Among other work, he performed on-site supervision for the Akaboshi Cottage (1931) for Japanese golfer Shiro Akaboshi, a house for Kisuke Akaboshi (1932), and the Kawasaki House (1934).

In May 1940, he travelled to Antonin's home in New Hope, Pennsylvania, spending fourteen months living and working in the studio there. He oversaw the installation of a small tea house at the Japan Institute in Manhattan.

== Solo career ==
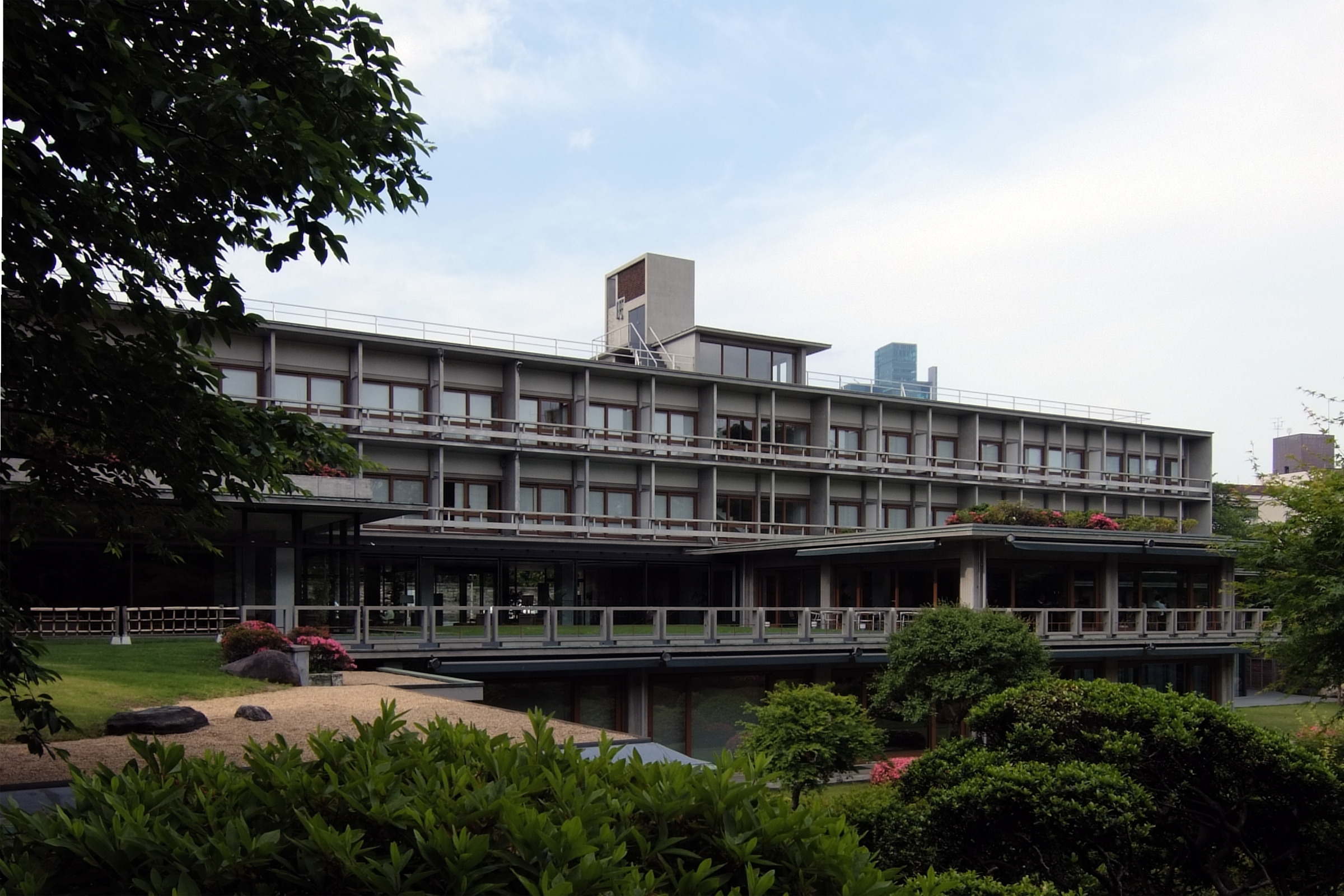
International House of Japan, Tokyo, 1955

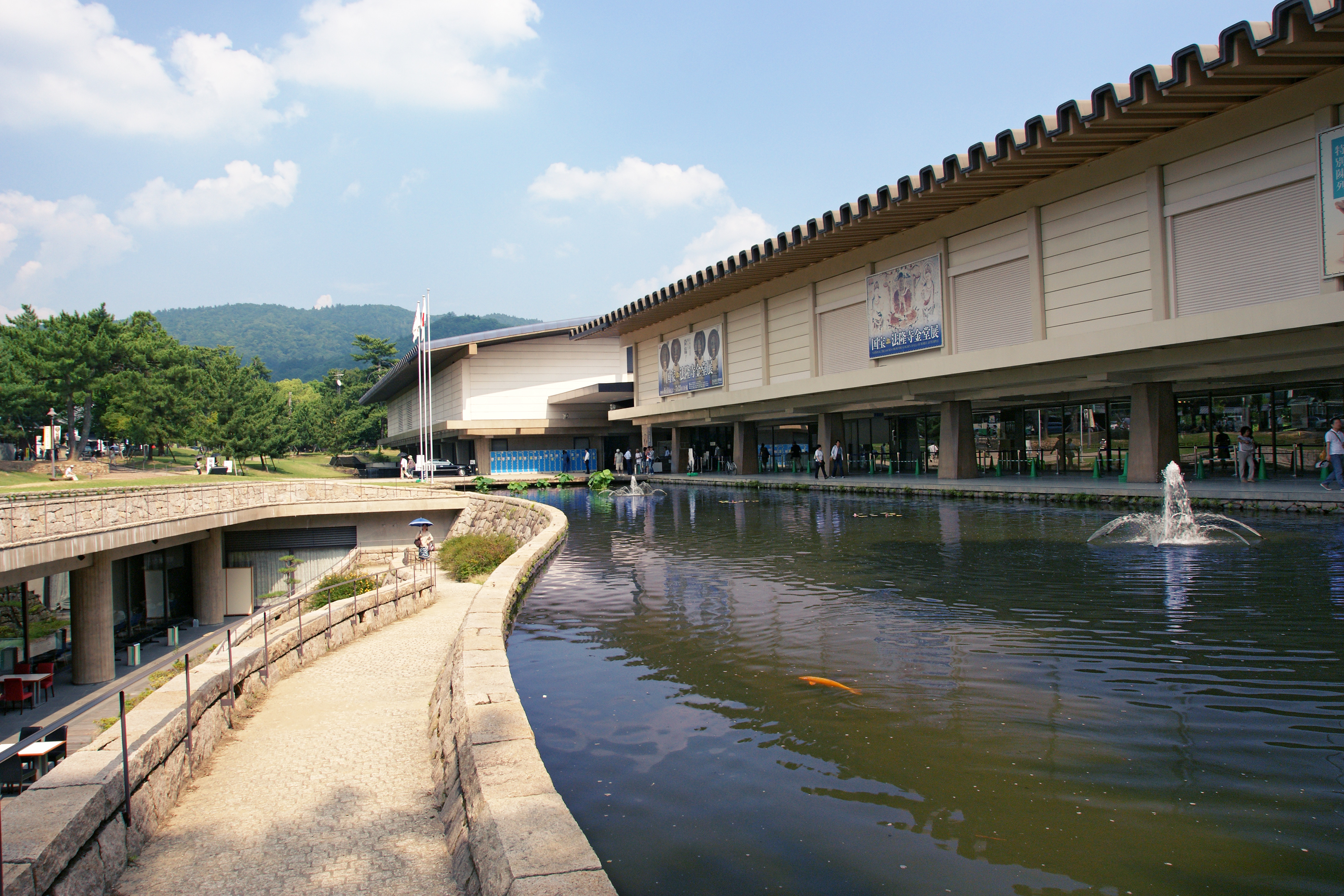
Nara National Museum, 1972

On his return to Tokyo in 1941, he set up his own practice. In 1953, because of his connections with Raymond, Yoshimura secured the project to design a traditional Japanese Tea House in the garden of the Museum of Modern Art in Manhattan. This house, named Shofuso (Pine Breeze Villa), was moved to Philadelphia, Pennsylvania, in 1957, where it remains as a historical site open to the public as Shofuso Japanese House and Garden.

In 1955, he collaborated with Kunio Maekawa and Junzo Sakakura to design the International House of Japan in Roppongi, Tokyo. This cultural exchange complex is located within estates owned during the Edo period by samurai lords. The building is constructed in-situ of thin-set reinforced concrete walls, pre-cast concrete columns and beams, and Oya Stone. With his two colleagues collaborating on this design, Yoshimura won the Architectural Institute of Japan Prize for Specific Contribution.

Yoshimura's later works include the Tikotin Museum of Japanese Art (1959) in Haifa, Tokyo Imperial Palace (1968), Japan House (with George G. Shimamoto of Kelly & Gruzen, 1969–71) in Manhattan, the East and West Wings of the Nara National Museum (1972), and the Royal Norwegian Embassy (1977) in Tokyo.

In its March 1, 2025 edition, the T Magazine of the New York Times featured an article noting that the restoration of a coastal home in Japan by him had revived interest in the designs of Yoshimura.
