= Takamasa Yoshizaka =

Takamasa Yosizaka
- Born: 13 February 1917; Koishikawa, Tokyo
- Died: 17 December 1980 (aged 63)
- Education: Waseda University, Tokyo
- Occupation: Architect
- Awards: Former president of the Architectural Institute of Japan
- Practice: Atelier U
- Buildings: Inter-University Seminar House, Ura House, The Japan Pavilion at the Venice Biennale

Takamasa Yoshizaka (吉阪 隆正, Yosizaka Takamasa; February 13, 1917—December 17, 1980), family name also romanized as Yosizaka, was a Japanese architect and former president of the Architectural Institute of Japan and a keen mountaineer.

After graduating from university, he worked at Le Corbusier's atelier in Paris for two years working on projects in France and India. After his return to Japan, he collaborated on Le Corbusier's National Museum of Western Art in Tokyo in 1959. He set up his own practice called Atelier U in 1964.

He proposed a theory of Discontinuous Unity and translated many of Le Corbusier's works from French into Japanese.

== Early life ==
Takamasa Yosizaka was the first-born son of Toshizo and Hanako Yosizaka. He was born in Koishikawa in Tokyo. In 1921 he and his family left for Geneva where his father was an official for the Japanese government setting up the International Labour Organization. They returned to Japan in 1923 and moved to Hyakunin-cho in Shinjuku, Tokyo.

After entering Waseda University Architecture Department in 1938 he graduated in 1943 before being drafted into the army. On returning from the war he went to live again in Shinjuku but built himself a house as the previous one had been burnt down in American bombing on 25 May 1945.

In 1950 he accepted a French Government grant to work and study architecture in France where he enjoyed two years working at Le Corbusier's atelier in Paris.

== Life with Le Corbusier ==
Yoshizaka arrived in Marseilles in late September 1950. On 24 September 1950 he was shown around Le Corbusier's Unité d'Habitation which was under construction at that time. Two weeks later he was in Paris at Le Corbusier's office.

Whilst in the office he worked on a number of projects including: site supervision at the Marseilles Unité d'Habitation, a Law School in Chandigarh and Nantes-Rezé Unité d'Habitation.

In 1951 another group of Japanese students came to France to study. Amongst them was Ura Taro, a mathematician. He and Yosizaka became good friends and Ura asked Yosizaka to design his home upon his return to Japan.

== Other interests ==
Yosizaka was a keen mountaineer. He joined the mountaineering club at high school in 1935 and in 1960 led an expedition to Denali in Alaska.

When he was living in Paris he appeared as an extra in the Julien Duvivier film Sous le ciel de Paris where he cycles through a scene by the Seine on a bicycle.

== Return to Japan ==
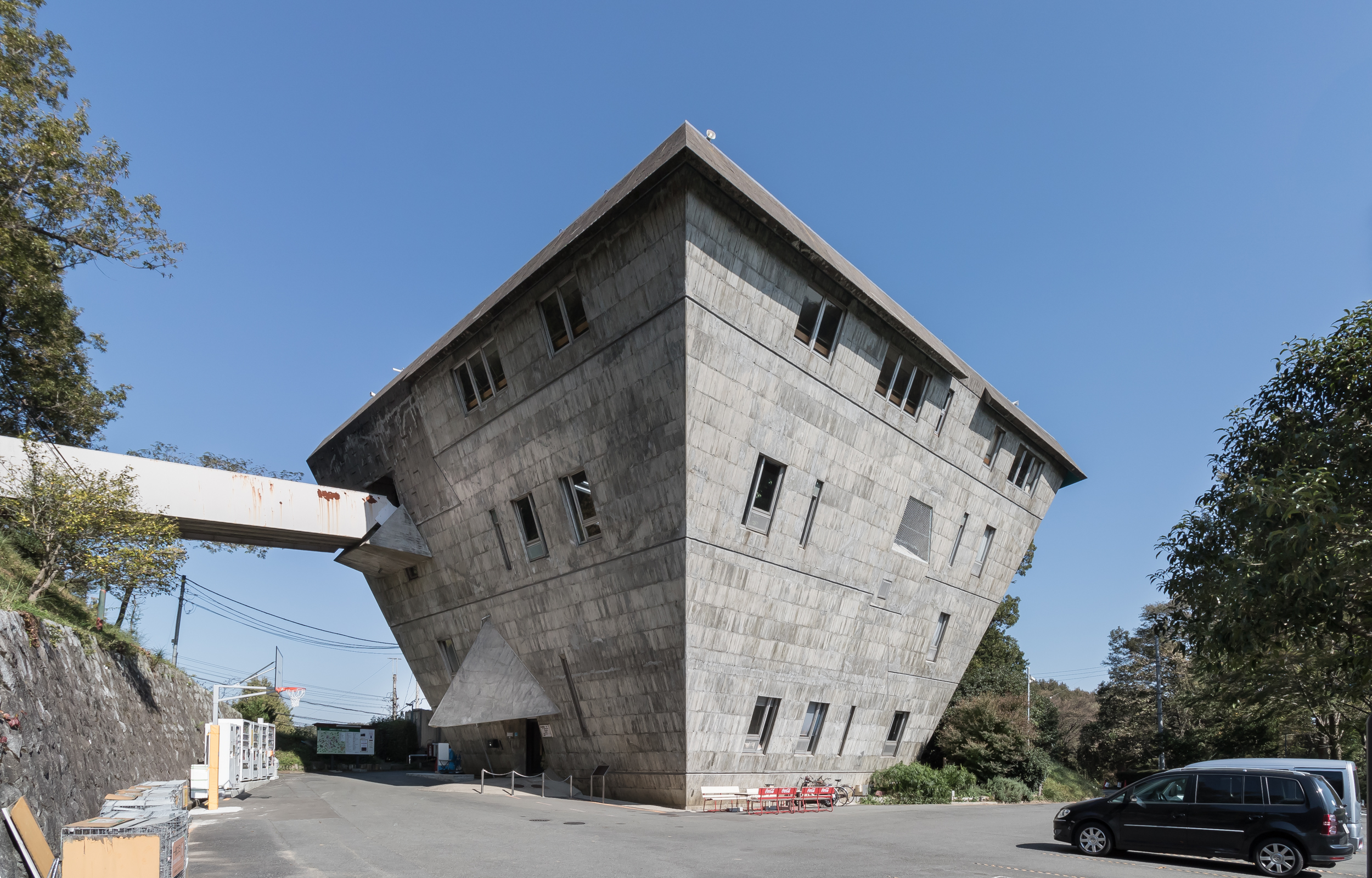
Inter-University Seminar House, at Hachioji

On his return to Japan in late 1952, he continued his own works. In 1959, he was appointed as a professor of Architecture at Waseda University before forming his own practice, Atelier U in 1964.

== National Museum of Western Art, Tokyo ==
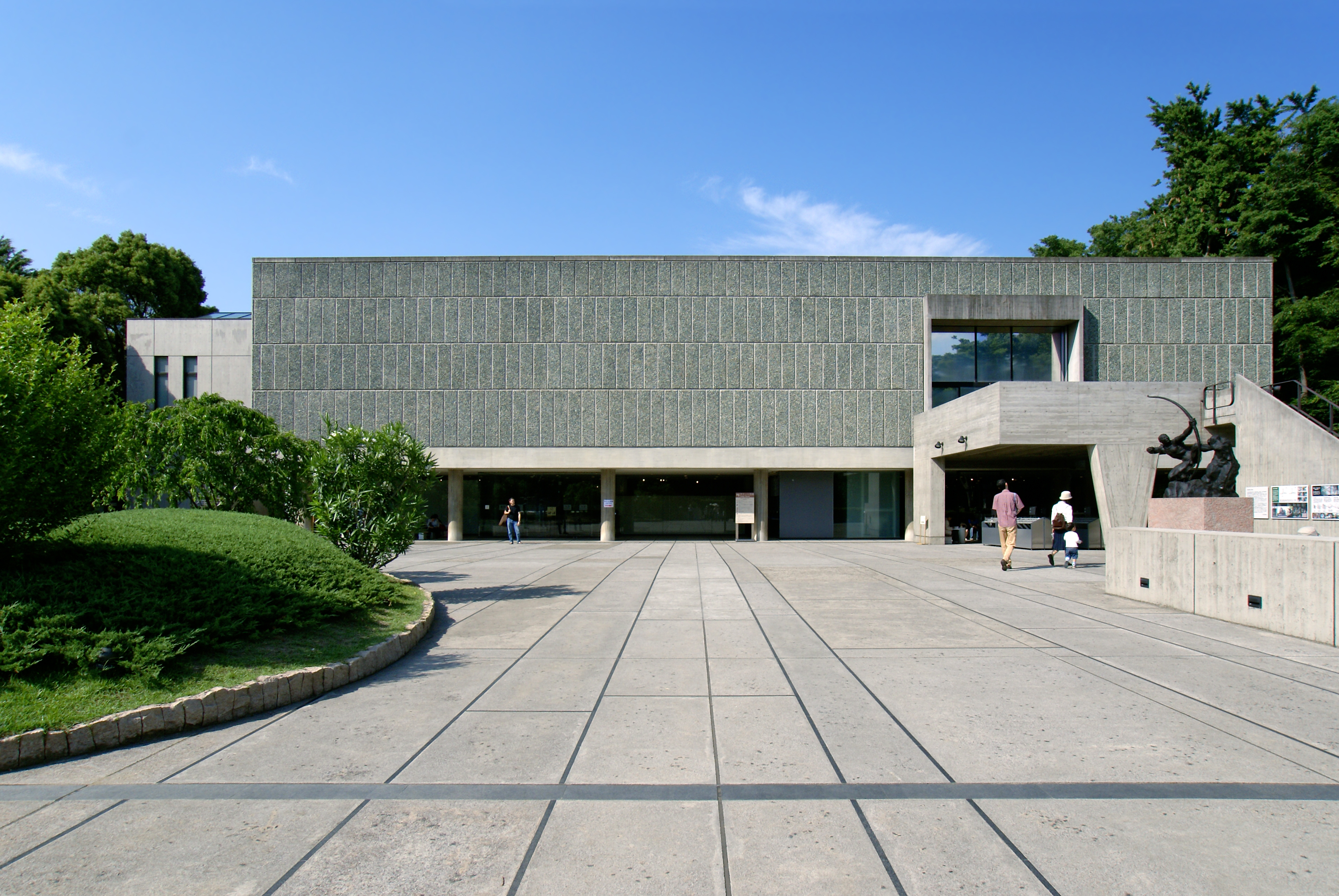
National Museum of Western Art, Tokyo, 1959, designed by Le Corbusier

Le Corbusier's only building in Japan is the National Museum of Western Art in Tokyo. Le Corbusier's three Japanese apprentices: Kunio Maekawa, Junzo Sakakura and Yoshizaka were responsible for executing the plans and supervising the construction. The principle of using so-called local architects to implement his designs was so successful here that Le Corbusier insisted it should be done for the Carpenter Center for the Visual Arts in Harvard.

== Theories: Discontinuous Unity ==
Discontinuous Unity involves investigating the natural laws, autonomy, and individuality of the systems and construction of all of nature including the cosmos and discovering the relationship rules and patterns between these things and humanity and human living environment.

Yosizaka and his team then attempt to apply this as a basic ideology to all design and planning included in the human environment: architecture, town planning and even cosmic spaces.

-Hiroki Onobayashi, August 1966 "A Profile of the Versatile Takamasa Yosizaka" Japan Architect, p32

== Legacy ==
Yosizaka made many of Le Corbusier's works available to native speakers by translating them from French into Japanese. This included books about the modulor system of proportioning.

In 1971, three members of Yosizaka's practice: Hiroyasu Higuchi, Reiko Tomita and Koichi Otake left to form the architectural practice Atelier Zo. One of his students, Saito Yuko wrote the book Yoshizaka's Method about the design for Ura Taro's house and formed her own practice Atelier Site. Japanese Design Magazine Casa Brutus named him one of Japan's Modern Masters in a recent special issue.

== Selected writings ==
- Chandigarh: the new capital of Punjab, India, 1951, Tokyo, A.D.A Edita (1974)
- L'Unité d'Habitation, Berlin, West Germany 1956-58, Tokyo, A.D.A Edita (1972)
- Chapell Notre Dame du Haut, Ronchamp, France, 1950-54, Tokyo, A.D.A Edita (1971)
- Group Organization and Physical Structure, Japan Architect, April 1966

== Selected projects ==
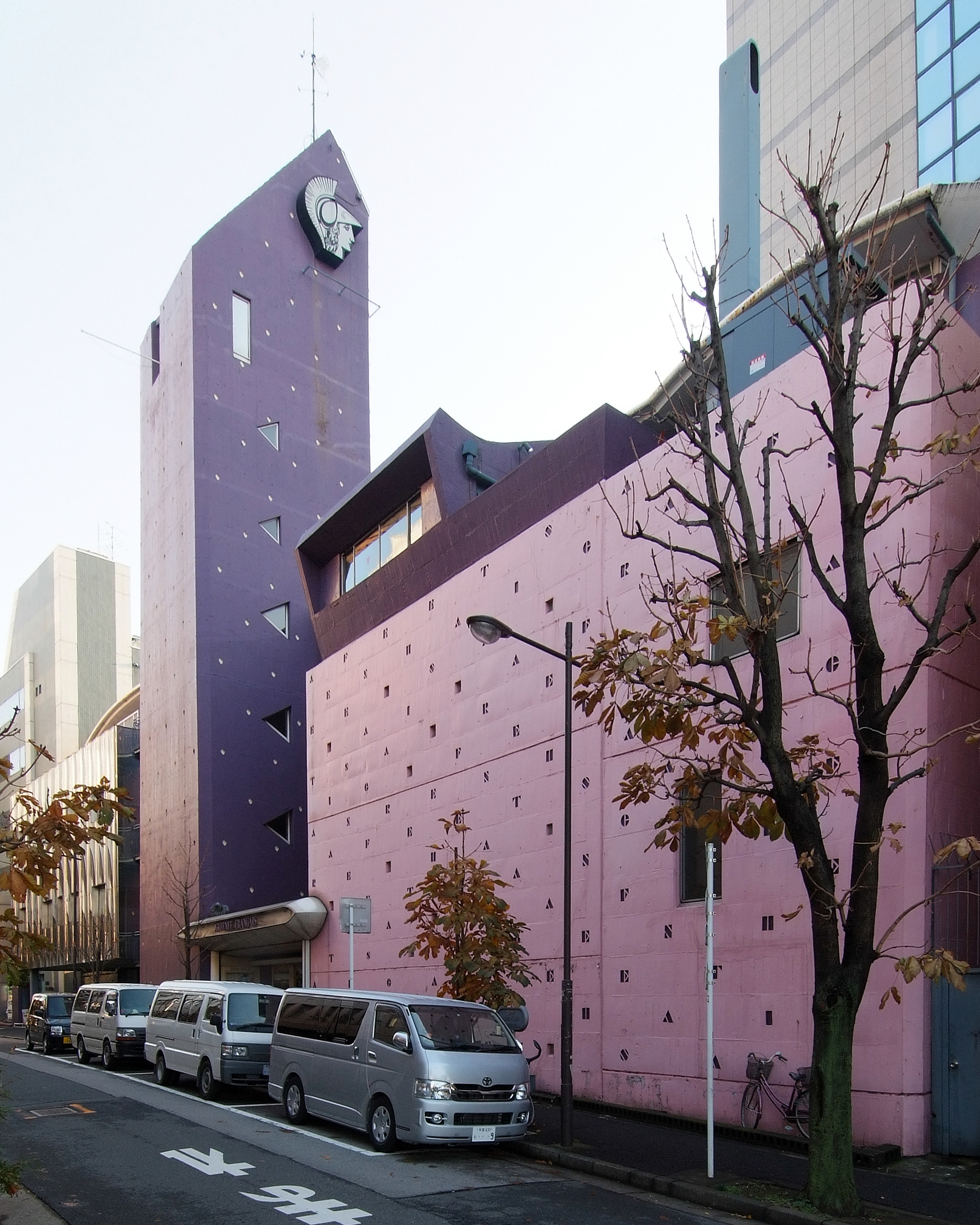
Athenee Francais, Tokyo, designed in 1962

- 1965: Inter-University Seminar House, Hachioji, Tokyo
- 1962: Athenee Francais, Tokyo
- 1962: Gozu City Hall
- 1959: Kaisei Gakuin (Higher School), Nagasaki
- 1957: Villa Cou Cou, Tokyo
- 1956: Ura House, nr Kobe
- 1956: The Japan Pavilion at the Venice Biennale, Venice
