= Sakakura =

Sakakura (written: 坂倉 or 阪倉) is a Japanese surname. Notable people with the surname include:

- Junzo Sakakura (坂倉 準三; 1901–1969), Japanese architect
- Yuji Sakakura (阪倉 裕二; born 1967), Japanese footballer and manager

Lainie Sakakura Japanese American Broadway Performer (6 original casts 1994–2016), Broadway Producer (Suffs, Cabaret, Gypsy), and Dance Reconstructor of Fosse (1999 Tony Award Best Musical). 1st AAPI Mrs Claus for Macy's Thanksgiving Day Parade (2025) and 2nd AAPI Radio City Music Hall Rockette (1994–1996). Recipient of the Joe A Callaway Award and Joseph Jefferson Award for Best Choreography. Co-founder of Rockettes of Color Alumnae and Sakachez.
