= Kenichi Kawaguchi =

Japanese structural engineering researcher

kenichi Kawaguchi
- 川口健一
- Born: 1 February 1962 (age 64); Tokyo, Japan
- Education: University of Tokyo
- Awards: AIJ Prize (Paper Award), Architectural Institute of Japan (2012) Pioneer Award, Space Structures Research Centre, University of Surrey (2021) Gengo Matsui Special Prize, Japan Structural Consultants Association (2022)
- Scientific career
- Fields: Structural engineering researcher
- Workplaces: Institute of Industrial Science, The University of Tokyo
- Website: space.iis.u-tokyo.ac.jp/main_e.html

Kenichi Kawaguchi (川口健一, Kawaguchi Ken'ichi, born 1 February 1962) is a Japanese structural designer and structural engineering researcher. He received a Doctor of Engineering from The University of Tokyo in 1991 and is a professor at Institute of Industrial Science (IIS), The University of Tokyo.

His research and design activities focus primarily on lightweight structures such as membrane structures and tension structures. His work includes practical research and development on the safety of large enclosures, the development of seismic isolation and vibration control structures, the safety of non-structural components such as ceilings, and the development of multi-purpose shelters. He has also been engaged in interdisciplinary research covering deployable and movable structures, space structures, the architectural application of living trees, preservation of historical spatial structures, and the application of generalized inverse matrix theory and numerical methods to structural engineering.

He has served as President of the Membrane Structures Association of Japan (from 2024), Vice President of the Architectural Institute of Japan (2022–2023), and Vice President of the International Association for Shell and Spatial Structures (IASS) (from 2012).

== Career ==
Kenichi Kawaguchi was born in Tokyo. He graduated from the Department of Architecture, Waseda University in 1985. In 1991, he completed the doctoral program at the Graduate School of Engineering at The University of Tokyo, receiving a Doctoral degree.

He became a research associate at IIS, the University of Tokyo in April 1991 and was promoted to lecturer in October of the same year. From 1993 to 1994, he worked as a visiting researcher at Imperial College London and the University of Cambridge in UK. In April 1995, he became an associate professor at the IIS, and in 2006, he was appointed a professor.

Since 2018, he has also served as technical advisor to Kawaguchi & Engineers, the structural design firm founded by his father, effectively overseeing its operations.

Since his doctoral student years, he has conducted research with his mentor, professor Yasuhiko Hangai, on the application of generalized inverse matrix theory to structural engineering, while simultaneously proposing and constructing a tension-truss dome system. His work combines theoretical research with the design and development of actual structures.

His interdisciplinary contributions include introducing the concept of human tolerance indices into the safety evaluation of ceilings, explaining the relationship between tensegrity structures and the cytoskeleton from a structural perspective, and exploring the application of living trees to architectural structures.

Following the sudden death of Professor Hangai, Kawaguchi established the Hangai Prize within IASS to encourage young researchers and has been responsible for its practical management since 2003.

He also served as the Organizing Committee Chair of IASS 2016 Tokyo, held at The University of Tokyo in 2016. Around the same time, in response to the design competition for the New National Stadium in Tokyo, he organized an international competition for young designers under the age of 40. Approximately 60 entries from around the world were submitted, and five were awarded prizes.

For the Grand Roof Ring of the 2025 Osaka-Kansai Expo, he submitted a proposal jointly with Showa Sekkei that incorporated the reuse of timber materials; the proposal was selected among the final five.

== Honours ==
- 1999 – AIJ Young Researcher Award, Architectural Institute of Japan, for “Folding Analysis of Frame Structures”
- 2004 – Outstanding Paper Award, Membrane Structures Association of Japan
- 2008 – Technical Award (Special Prize), Japan Association for Seismic Isolation, for “Development of a new rolling-type seismic isolation device based on the principle of the gauge pendulum”
- 2012 – AIJ Prize (Paper Award), Architectural Institute of Japan, for “Shape Transformation and Stress Control of Lightweight Flexible Structures”
- 2016 – Honorary Professor, Tianjin University
- 2020 – Taisei Foundation Award (Gold Prize), for “Development of a ceiling damage detection system using deep learning based on image data”
- 2021 – Pioneer Award, Space Structures Research Centre, University of Surrey
- 2022 – Gengo Matsui Special Prize, Japan Structural Consultants Association
- 2024 – Visiting Professor, Southeast University
- 2024 – Membrane Structure Design Award, Membrane Structures Association of Japan, for “White Rhino II”

== Selected publications ==
- Kawaguchi, Kenichi. Generalized Inverse Matrices and Their Applications to Structural Engineering (Computational Engineering Series 1), Corona Publisher, 2011 (in Japanese). ISBN 9784339057010
- Llorens, J. I. Membranes for Structural Applications. Woodhead Publishing Series in Civil and Structural Engineering, 2025. ISBN 9780443224058
- Structural Design Guidebook of Japan. Architectural Institute of Japan, 2023 (in Japanese). ISBN 9784767701837
- Kawaguchi, Kenichi; Takeuchi, Toru (eds.). Structural Design Map Tokyo. Sogoshikaku Co., Ltd., 2021. ISBN 9784864171212
- Structural Design Guidebook of the World I. Architectural Institute of Japan, 2019 (in Japanese). ISBN 9784767701639
- Llorens, J. I. (ed.). Fabric Structures in Architecture. Chapter 19: “Recent Developments in Architectural Fabric Structures in Japan”. Woodhead Publishing, 2015. ISBN 9781782422334
- Kawaguchi, Kenichi (chief editor and co-author). Guidelines for Safety Measures Against Accidental Fall of Ceilings and Other Non-Structural Components. Architectural Institute of Japan, 2015 (in Japanese). ISBN 9784818942066
- Mungan, Ihsan; Abel, John (eds.). Fifty Years of Progress for Shell and Spatial Structures. IASS, 2011. ISBN 9781907132353
- Kawaguchi, Kenichi (supervising editor and co-author). A Professional Guide to Understanding Architecture. Natsume Publishing, 2010 (in Japanese). ISBN 9784563033804
- Hangai, Hirohiko; Kawaguchi, Kenichi. Form Analysis: Generalized Inverse Matrices and Their Applications. Baifukan, 1991 (in Japanese) (Chinese translation by Fuling Guan and Minger Wu, published in 2014). ISBN 9784767701837

== Selected structural design works ==
- 1991 – Rooftop Dome of Building C (Tension-truss dome), structural design
- 2001 – White Rhino I, structural design
- 2003 – New Building No.2, Faculty of Engineering, The University of Tokyo, structural design
- 2017 – White Rhino II, structural design
