= Architectural Institute of Korea =

South Korean academic organization

- Hangul: 대한건축학회
- RR: Daehan geonchukhakhoe
- MR: Taehan kŏnch'ukhakhoe

The Architectural Institute of Korea (AIK) is an academic organization on architecture based in Seoul, South Korea. Established in 1945, today AIK has more than 10,000 members. They represent architects, building engineers, researchers, architecture students, and teachers, and public officials.

The organization’s activities are in three different categories: academic research; information research (including four regularly published journals); and, educational and public activities. AIK is led by a governing body and has eight local chapters across South Korea. AIK has special exchange agreements with allied organizations worldwide, including the Architectural Institute of Japan (AIJ), the Architectural Society of China (ASC), and the Association of Collegiate Schools of Architecture (ASCA) of the United States.
