= Junzo Sakakura =

Japanese architect (1901–1969)

- Born: 1901; Hashima, Gifu Prefecture
- Died: 1969 (aged 67–68)
- Education: Tokyo Imperial University
- Occupation: Architect
- Children: Takenosuke Sakakura
- Awards: Former president of the Architectural Association of Japan
- Buildings: Kamakura Museum of Modern Art

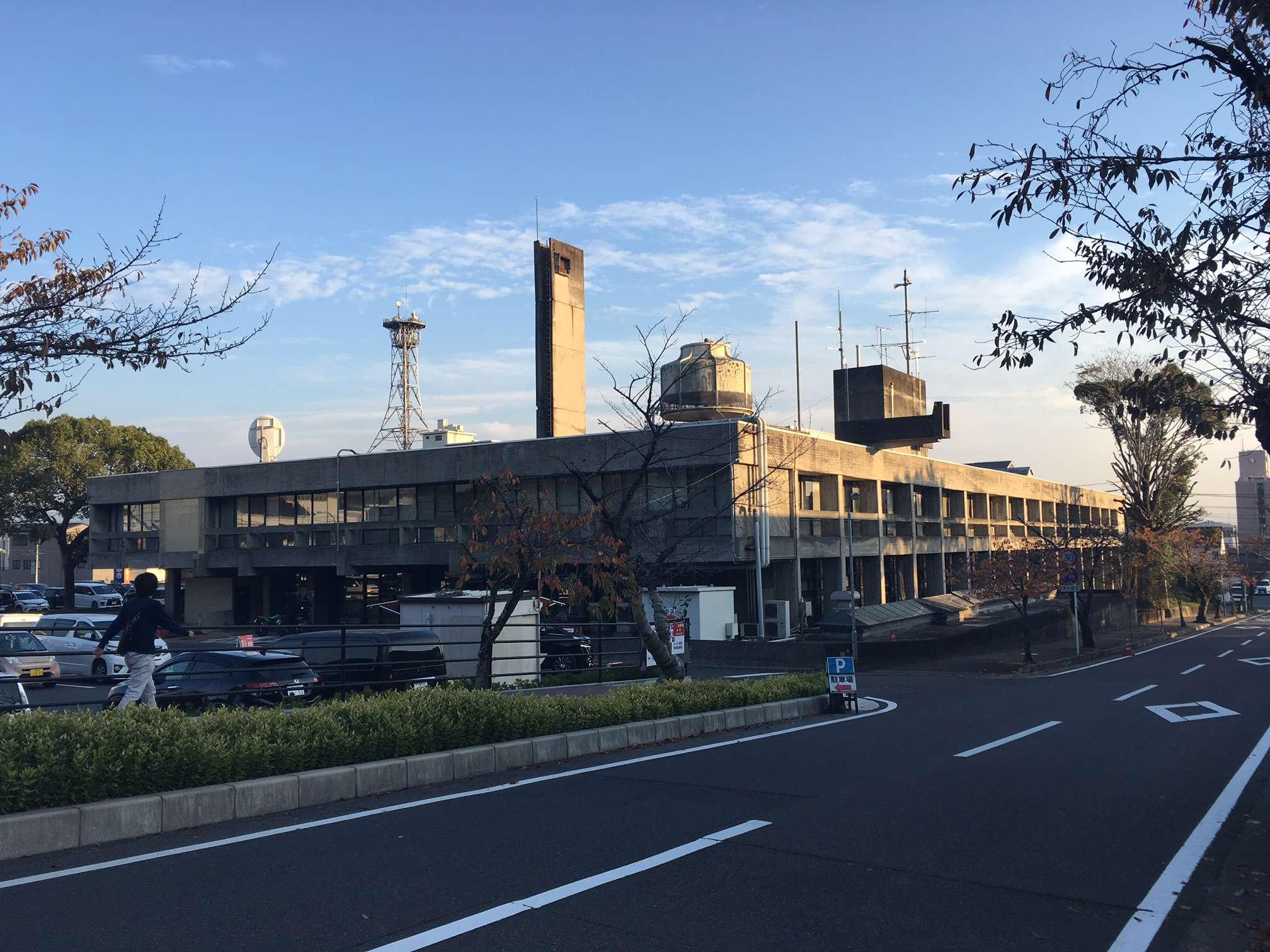
Iga city hall (1964)

Junzo Sakakura (坂倉 準三, Sakakura Junzō; 1901–1969) was a Japanese architect and former president of the Architectural Association of Japan.

After graduating from university he worked in Le Corbusier's atelier in Paris. He rose to the position of studio chief during his seven-year stay in the studio.

He formed his own practice on his return to Japan becoming an important member of the modernist movement. In 1959, he collaborated with Le Corbusier on the National Museum of Western Art in Tokyo.

== Early life and formative years ==
Junzo Sakakura was born in Hashima-gun in Gifu Prefecture. In 1923 he entered the Art History Department of Tokyo Imperial University, graduating in 1927.

=== Le Corbusier's Atelier ===
Almost coinciding with Kunio Maekawa's return from Paris, in 1930 Sakakura journeyed to France to enter Le Corbusier's Atelier. He had left Japan at an opportune moment as the economy was in recession with a spiralling increase in political violence.

At the behest of Le Corbusier, Sakakura enrolled on a course in architectural construction at college for six months before commencing his apprenticeship. On a daily basis Corbusier would arrive at the atelier and speak with the job architects about the projects. He would sit with the students and do sketches of his thoughts. As Sakakura became more trusted in the office he rose first to job architect and then chief of the studio. Students would come to him for advice when Corbusier was not about.

Ongoing projects in the office that may have influenced Sakakura later in his career include the Villa Savoye and the Swiss pavilion.

== Paris Exposition, 1937 ==
In 1936 Kishida Hideto (1899–1966) a professor at Tokyo University was put in charge of organising a limited entry competition for the design of the Japanese Pavilion at the 1937 Paris Exposition. Although Kunio Maekawa's design was initially favoured it was eventually dismissed as being too modernist and Maeda Kenjiro's traditionalist design was chosen in its place. However, the French Government insisted that the design being completed with French materials and labour so this led to Sakakura receiving the commission as he had just returned to Japan (from Corbusier's office).

Sakakura returned to France to supervise the project but unexpected site conditions forced him to change the design and he sought Le Corbusier's advice on this. The building comprised a grey walled box on a black piloti with a free formed plan and ramped access and was voted the "Grand Prix" of the Exposition.

Coming from a literary background, Sakakura was in some ways hindered by the technological aspects of his aspirations. Although he locked himself away in a Parisian hotel to complete the work on the pavilion later in life he favoured the style of Corbusier's office, entrusting his plans to other architects in the practice.

== Notable buildings ==
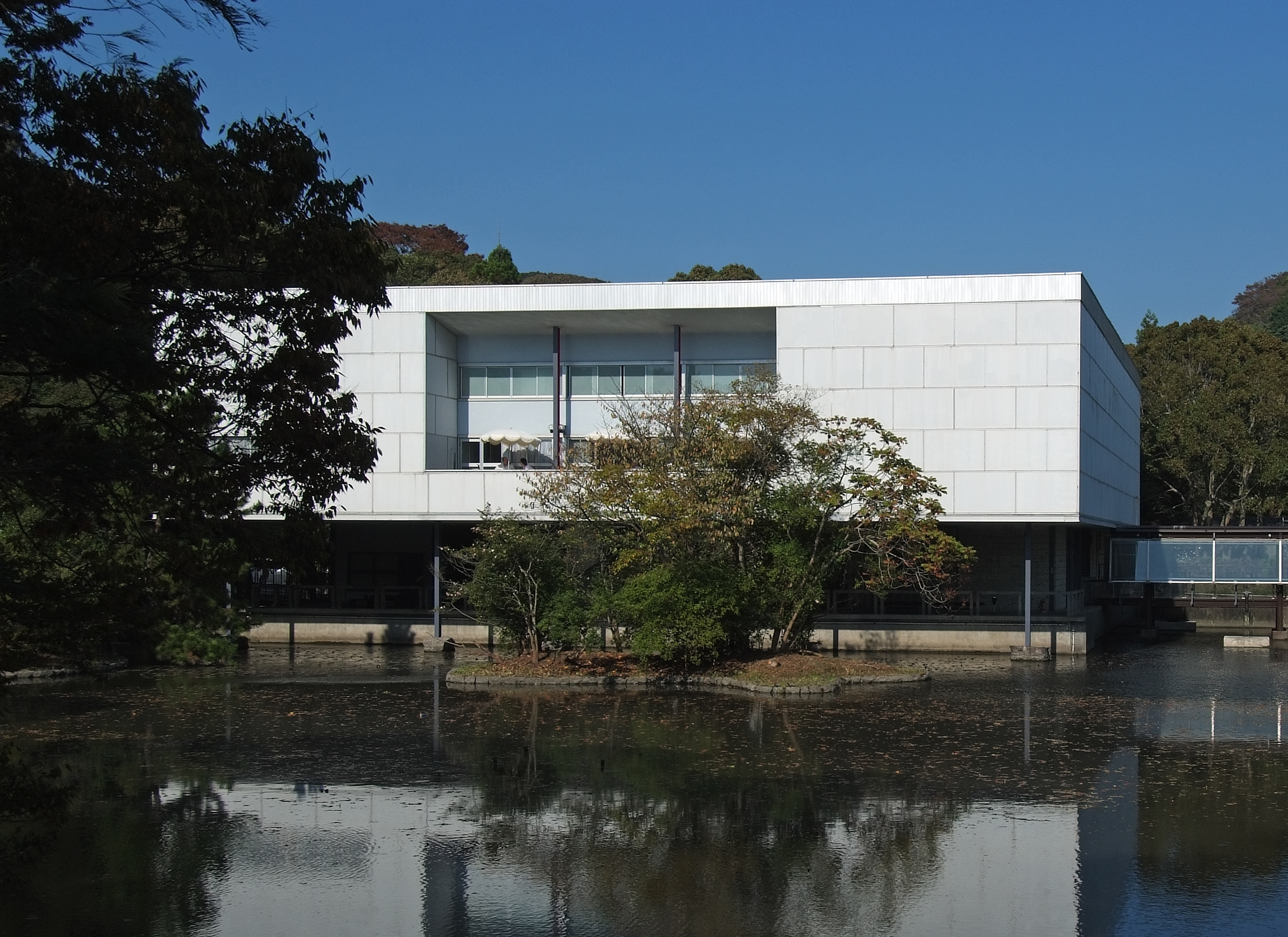
The Museum of Modern Art, Kamakura, 1951

The Museum of Modern Art, Kamakura, 1951

Sakakura won a limited entry competition for the design of the Museum of Modern Art in the grounds of the Tsurugaoka Hachiman Shrine in Kamakura. The building comprises a second storey white box containing the gallery spaces supported on thin steel red and green piloti. The ground floor storey that faces onto the lake is built with Oya Stone.

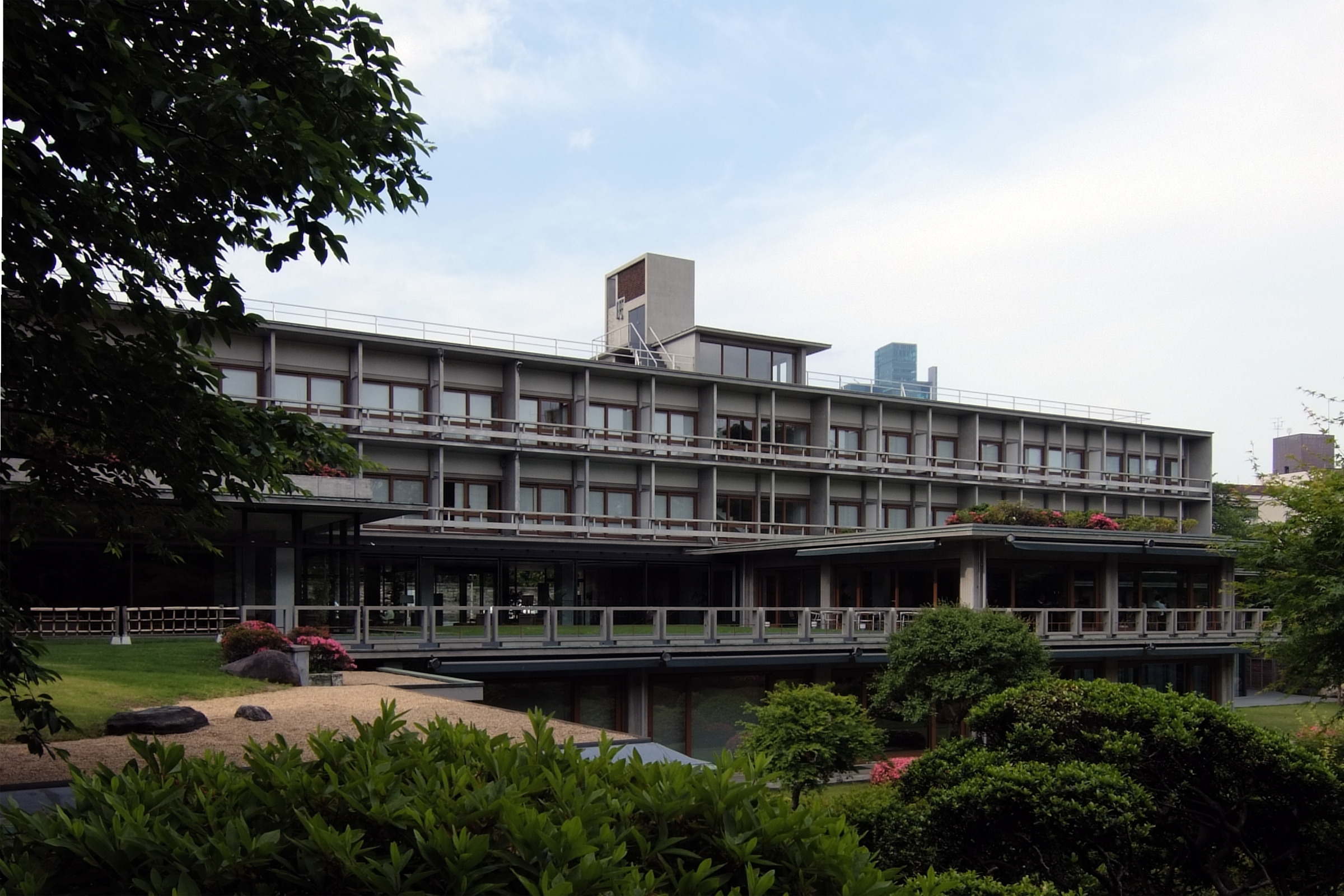
International House of Japan, Tokyo, 1955

The International House of Japan, Tokyo, 1955

Sakakura collaborated with his friend Kunio Maekawa and Junzō Yoshimura on this cultural exchange building in Roppongi, Tokyo. It is primarily constructed of in-situ reinforced concrete, with the public areas of the building faced with Oya Stone. The building went on to win the annual design award from Nihon Kenchiku Gakkai.

National Museum of Western Art, Tokyo, 1959

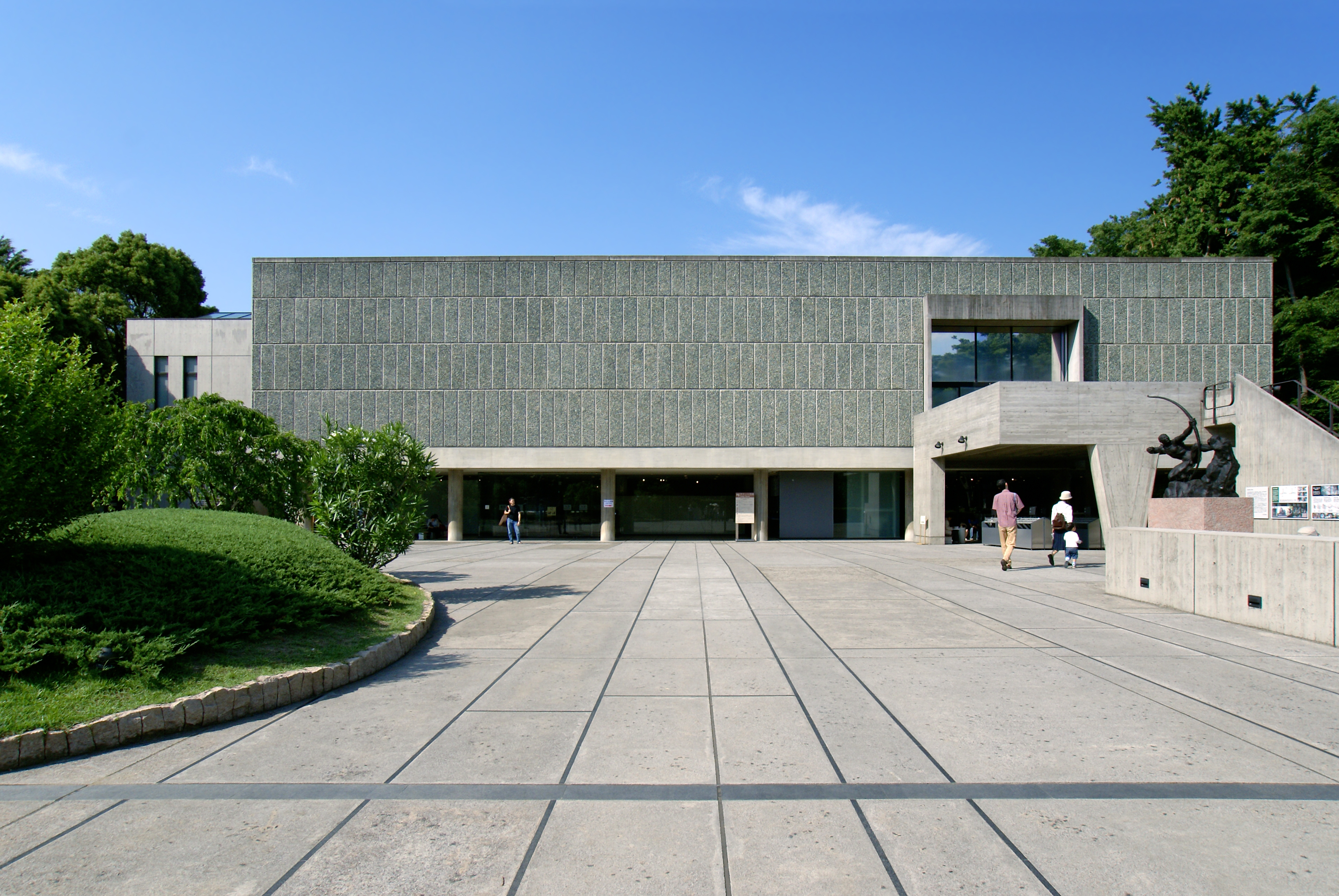
National Museum of Western Art, Tokyo, 1959, designed by Le Corbusier

Le Corbusier's only building in Japan is the National Museum of Western Art in Tokyo. Le Corbusier's three Japanese apprentices: Kunio Maekawa, Junzo Sakakura and Takamasa Yoshizaka were responsible for executing the plans and supervising the construction. The principle of using so-called local architects to implement his designs was so successful here that Le Corbusier insisted it should be done for the Carpenter Center for the Visual Arts in Harvard.

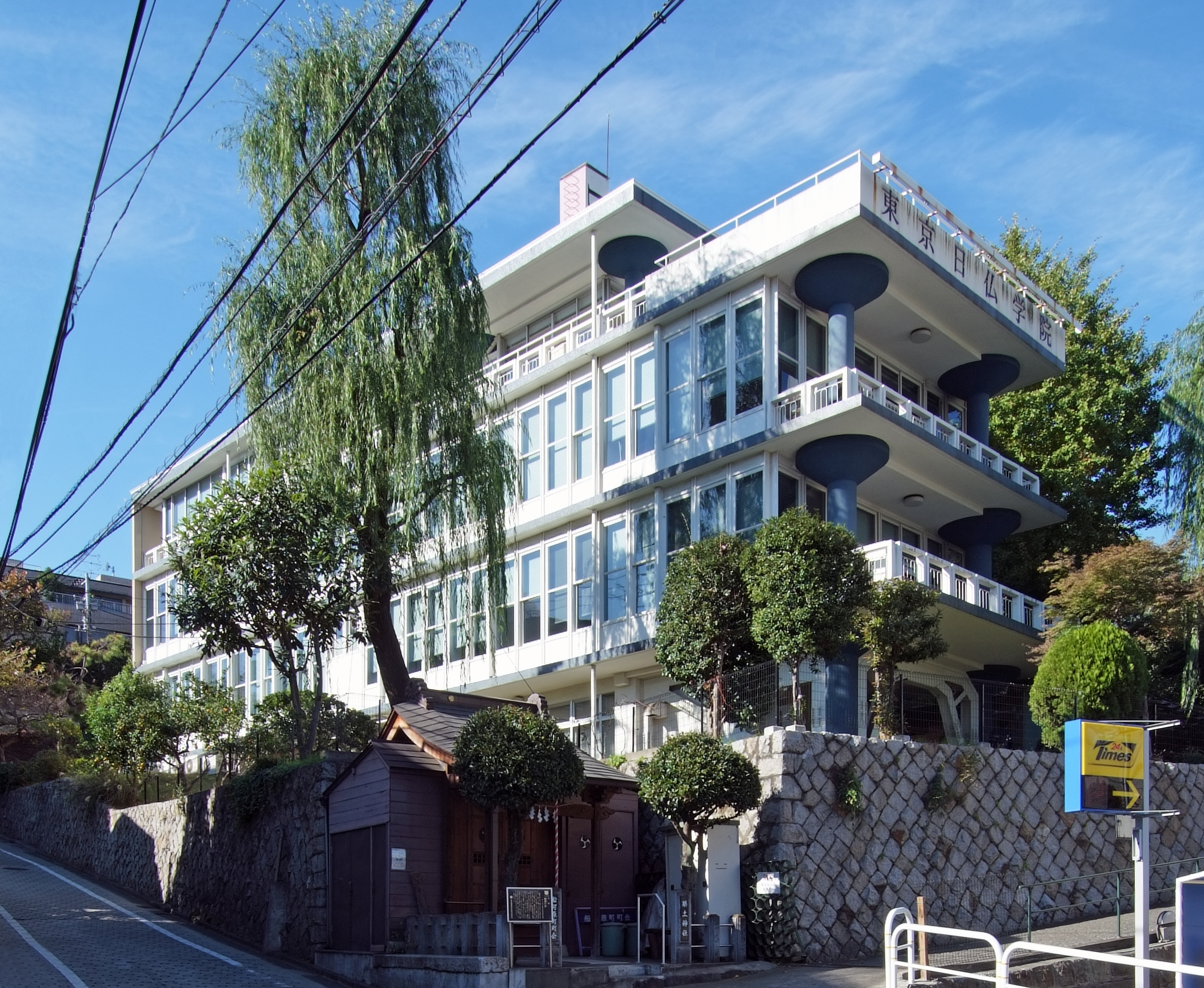
Institute of France-Japan (1951)

West Plaza of Shinjuku Station, Tokyo, 1967

One of the grandest urban design projects he undertook, this is a two-storey urban plaza incorporating the bus terminal. Two huge ramps at the centre allow taxi access from ground level down to Shinjuku Station's west exit.

== Legacy ==
Japanese Design Magazine Casa Brutus named him one of Japan's Modern Masters in a recent special issue. The Kamakura Museum of Modern Art hosted a retrospective of Sakakura's work from May to September 2009.

"Within the course of the Modern Architectural Movement, if Sakakura does not rank with the towering figures of Mies, Wright, and Le Corbusier, he is certainly on a par with such men as Finland's Alvar Aalto..."

Hamaguchi Ryuichi, December 1969 "In Grief - Over the Loss of Junzo Sakakura" Japan Architect

== Selected projects ==
- 1937 Japanese Pavilion at the Paris Expo
- 1951 Kamakura Museum of Modern Art, Kamakura
- 1955 International House of Japan, Tokyo
- 1959 Hashima City Hall, Gifu
- 1959 Silk Centre, Yokohama
- 1962 Kure City Hall and Municipal Auditorium, Kure
- 1964 Hiraoka City Hall, Hiraoka
- 1966 †Former West Plaza of Shinjuku Station and Underground Parking Lot, Tokyo (extinct)
