= Architectural Society of China =

- 中国建筑学会
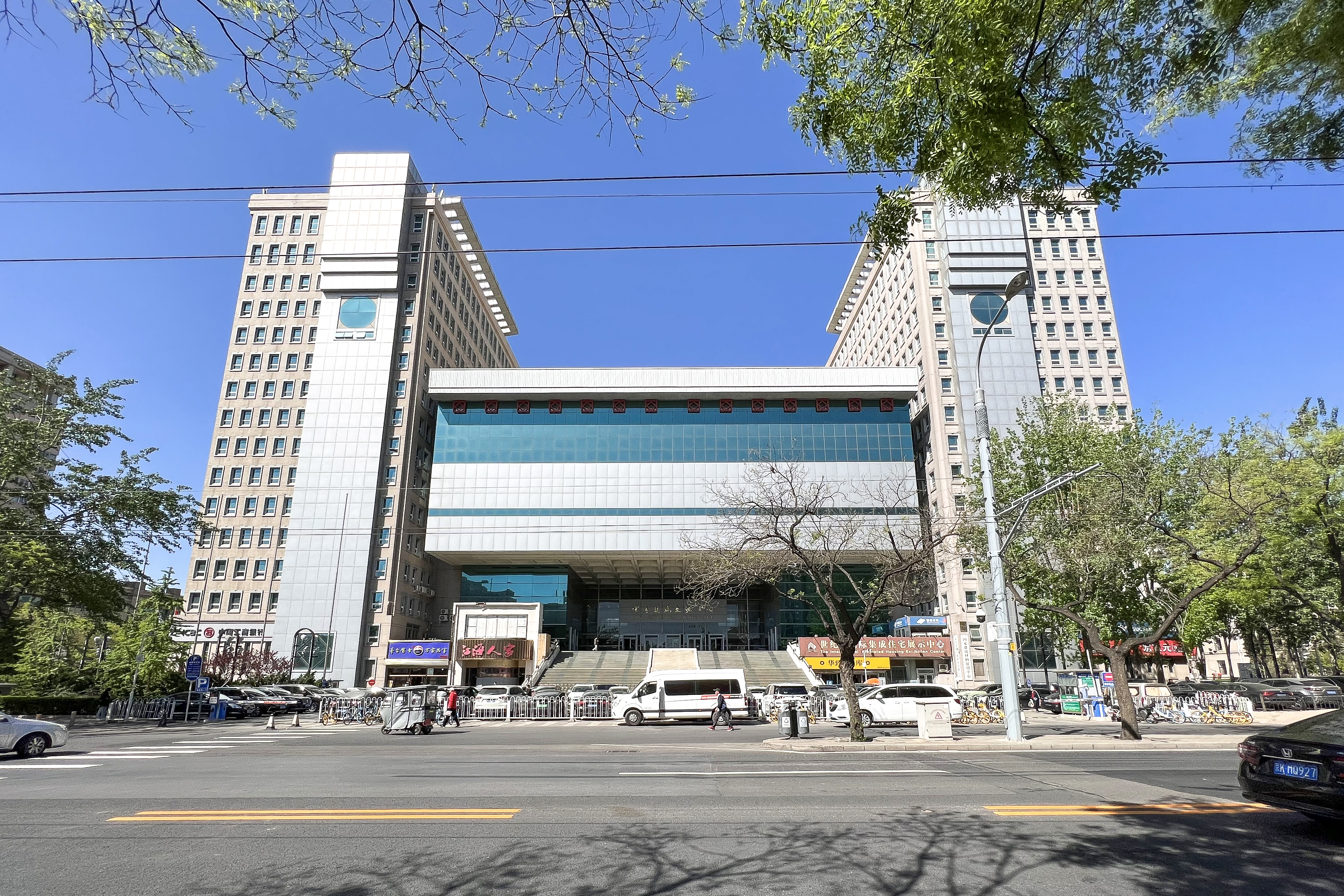
- Headquarters
- Abbreviation: ASC
- Formation: 1953-10-23
- Region served: Mainland China
- Official language: Chinese
- Website: 中国建筑学会

The Architectural Society of China (in Chinese 中国建筑学会) is an organization established in 1953 that integrates various services in the field of architecture and urban planning in the People's Republic of China, affiliated with the China Association for Science and Technology and the Ministry of Housing and Urban-Rural Development.

== History ==
The Architectural Society of China was formally established in October 1953. In 1955, it became a member of the International Union of Architects, and in 1989, it became a member of the Asian Architects Association.

Currently, the society is organized into departments of architecture, building construction, rural architecture for small towns, earthquake disaster prevention department, comprehensive building fire protection technology area, and architectural history department, engineering management research department, earth construction department, construction economics, interior design, engineering study, building structures, construction materials, foundations, electricity in buildings, HVAC, building physics, thermal energy in buildings, sports buildings, water supply and drainage research department, industrial construction, up to a total of 22 departments directly coordinated by the Architectural Society or China.

In addition to the specific areas of work in the subjects assigned to each department, the Architectural Society of China periodically publishes monographs and magazines in its area of publications.

== Directivos ==
- From 2011 to the present: Che Shujian.
