= Ōya stone =

Geologic formation in Japan

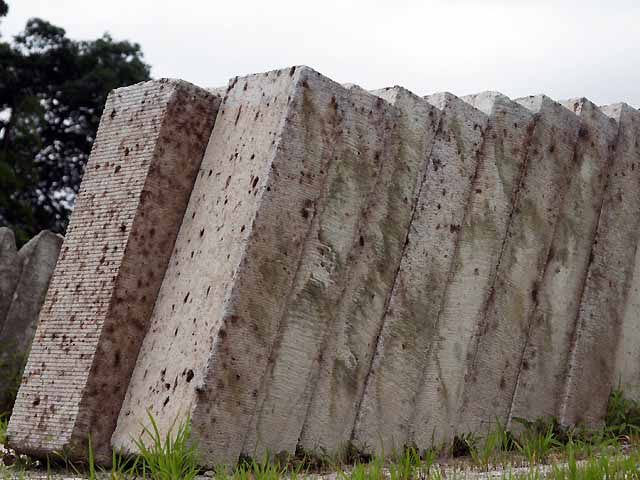
Cut slabs of Ōya stone

Ōya stone (大谷石, Ōya-ishi) is an igneous rock, created from lava and ash. Ōya stone was famously used in the facing of Frank Lloyd Wright's Imperial Hotel in Tokyo. One reason this stone was used is because it has a warm texture and is easily carved, which allows much versatility. Ōya stone can have different colors and is also fireproof.

Ōya stone can only be found in an area 4 kilometers to the east and west by 6 kilometers to the north and south around the town of Ōya, near Utsunomiya, but there are reserves of around 600 million tons.
