= Architectural Institute of Japan =

Japanese professional association

- 一般社団法人日本建築学会
- Abbreviation: AIJ
- Formation: 1886
- Type: Learned society
- Headquarters: Tokyo
- Location: Japan
- Official language: Japanese
- President: Nobuaki Furuya
- Website: https://www.aij.or.jp/aijhome.htm

The Architectural Institute of Japan, or AIJ, is a Japanese professional body for architects, building engineers, and researchers in architecture.

The institute was founded in 1886 as an institute for architects. It was renamed the Architectural Institute in 1905, and given its present name in 1947.

Today the institute has about 38,000 members. Its mission is to advance the science and technology of architecture through mutual collaboration by its members. It sponsors roughly 600 sub-committees and working groups under 16 standing research committees. The institute's central office and library is in Tokyo with nine regional chapters (Hokkaido, Tohoku, Kanto, Tokai, Hokuriku, Kinki, Chugoku, Shikoku and Kyushu).

The institute publishes the Journal of Architecture and Building Science, Transactions of AIJ, Selected Architectural Designs of the Architectural Institute of Japan, the AIJ Journal of Technology and Design, Summaries of Technical Papers of Annual Convention, the Journal of Asian Architecture and Building Engineering (JAABE), and technical standards and specifications for the architectural design and construction professions. It also publishes the results of research committee studies, terminology dictionaries, textbooks, slides, videotapes, and books for the general public.

Prizes awarded by the institute for individual achievement, built work, and research are among the most prestigious in the industry.
