= Togo Murano =

Japanese architect

Tōgo Murano
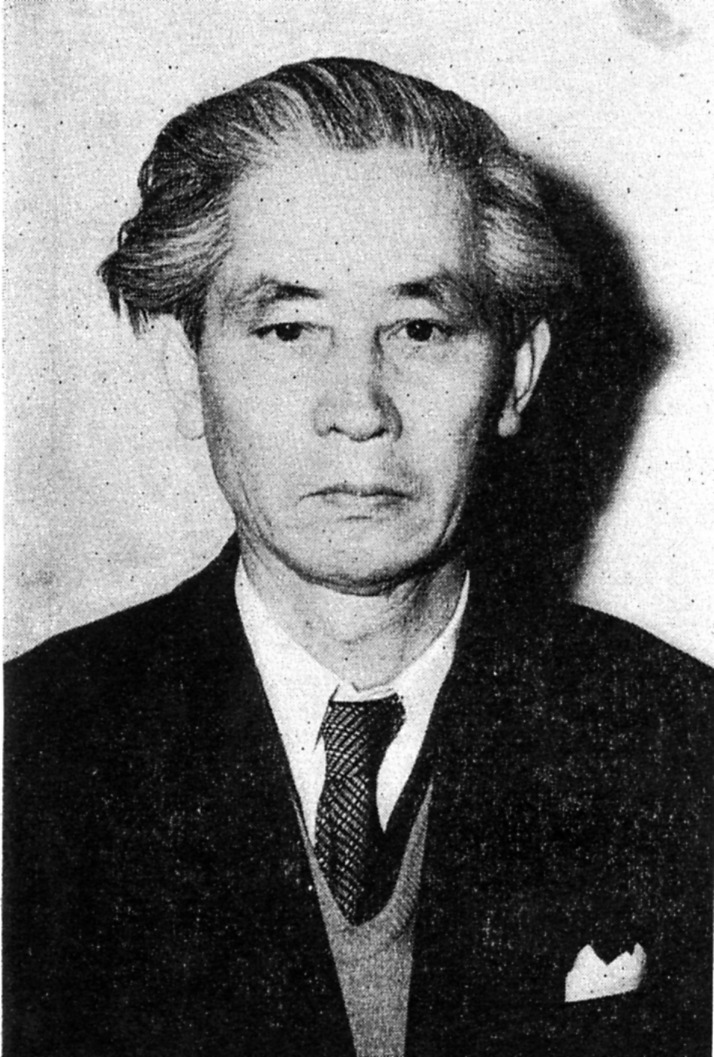
- Born: May 15, 1891; Karatsu, Japan
- Died: November 26, 1984 (aged 93); Takarazuka, Japan
- Education: Waseda University
- Occupation: Architect
- Awards: Order of Culture in 1967, Elected Honorary Member of the American Institute of Architects in 1970, Honorary Doctorate from Waseda University in 1974
- Practice: Murano and Mori
- Buildings: Memorial Cathedral for World Peace, Ube City Public Hall

Tōgo Murano (村野 藤吾, Murano Tōgo; May 15, 1891 – November 26, 1984) was a Japanese architect. Although his formative years were between 1910 and 1930, he remained active in design throughout his life and at the time of his death was responsible for over three hundred completed projects.

Although his work lacked a distinctive singular style, he was recognised as a master of the modern interpretation of the sukiya style. His work included large public buildings as well as hotels and department stores and he has been recognised as one of Japan's modern masters.

== Life ==
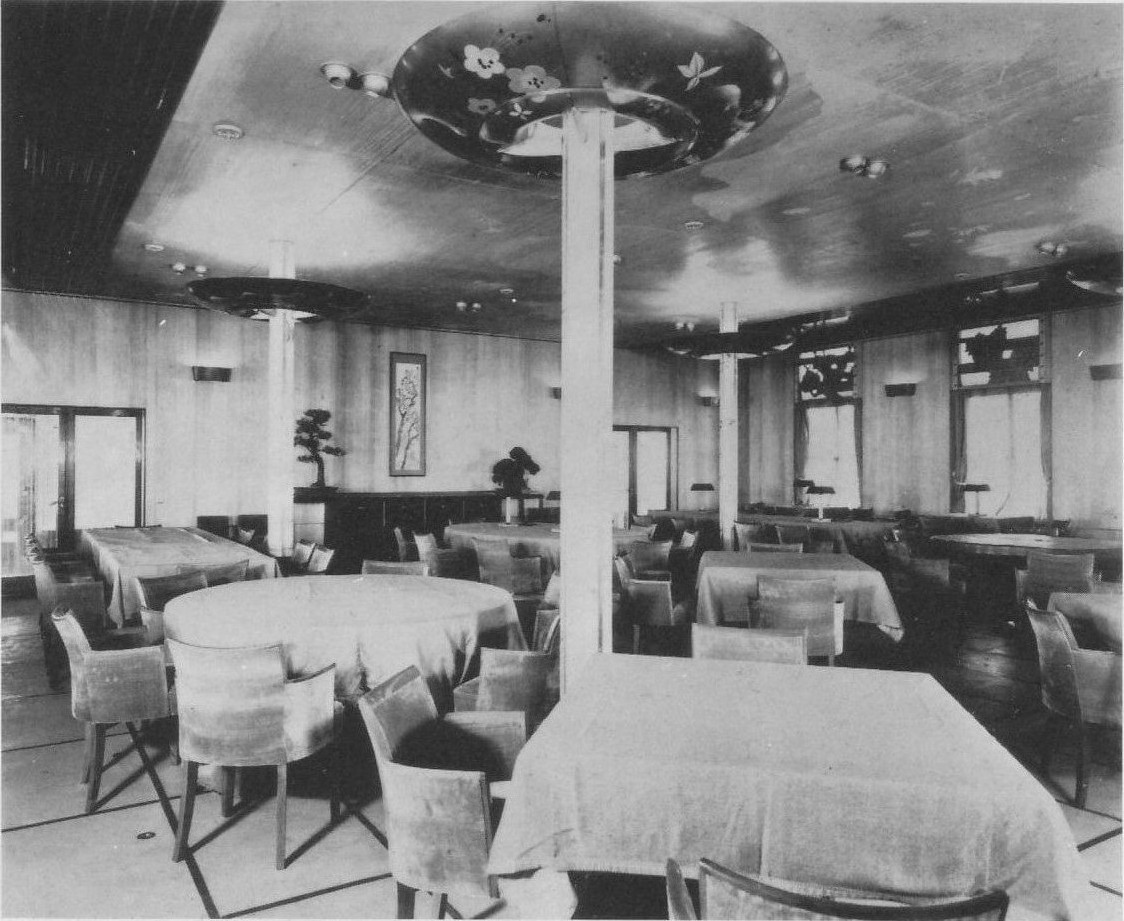
Dining Room of the Argentina Maru, 1939

After serving two years in a volunteer military corps Murano entered the Department of Electrical Engineering at Waseda University in 1913. In 1915 he transferred to the Architecture Department before graduating in 1918. Unlike his contemporaries, he moved from Tōkyō to Ōsaka and started work at the Kansai office of Setsu Watanabe. Murano spent eleven years at Watanabe's office learning all aspects of design and working on many large projects such as offices, commercial buildings and cultural facilities. In 1920 he was sent to America and Europe to further his knowledge and architectural vocabulary. In 1929 he left Watanabe to start his own office.

During the Taishō Period when culture in Japan became liberated for the first time from authority, culture became politicised and nationalistic overtones brought modernist architects into conflict with the state. The liberal Murano channelled this conflict into an interest into sukiya architecture which allowed him to balance tradition and modernisation in his work. Unlike his contemporary, Antonin Raymond, Murano courted simplicity, concentrating on the high arts like tea ceremony and conceptual elegance. As well producing many sukiya-style buildings, such as the Kasuien Annex to the Miyako Hotel in Kyoto, Murano used the sukiya style to incorporate Japanese tradition with borrowed elements of Western style. The emphasis of the sukiya style on surfaces, the juxtaposition of materials and elaborate details can be found in his work, for example, the mother-of-pearl encrusted ceiling of the Nihon Seimei Hibiya Building and Nissei Theatre in Tōkyō.

In 1949 Murano reorganised his office and entered into partnership with Tiuchi Mori (1908-1999). During Murano's trip to Europe in the 1920s he became interested in Nordic architecture. Aspects of Saarinen's and Östberg's work such as Stockholm City Hall can be seen in his post-war projects such as the Memorial Cathedral for World Peace (1954), Yonago Public Hall (1958) and the Round Library at Kansai University (1959). Some of his later projects introduced angular motifs, circular plans and sensuous curves (like the Tanimura Art Museum in Itoigawa). In others, like the Industrial Bank of Japan, he blurred the boundaries between wall and ground.

The scope of Murano's work throughout his career covered many styles of architecture. He was influenced by Japanese and Western architecture but did not commit himself to one particular ideology. Although the sheer volume of his work led him to be criticised as simply a commercial architect, he always gave top priority to the requirements of his clients.

He was the author of a few publications in his lifetime. These included Staying above style! in 1919 and The Economic Environment of Architecture in 1926. In his 1931 Looking While Moving he riled against Le Corbusier and the Modern Movement and declared that the skyscrapers of Manhattan were the way forward.

In addition to his works of architecture, Murano designed the first-class lounge and dining rooms for the luxury cruise ships, Argentina Maru and Brazil Maru, both launched in 1939. The ships were sunk during World War II.

In 1973 Murano was awarded an Honorary Doctorate from Waseda University. Docomomo listed five of Murano's buildings in its selection of the 100 most important Japanese modernist buildings. Japanese design magazine Casa Brutus named Murano one of Japan's modern masters in their April 2009 special issue.

== Morigo Company Tokyo branch ==
This was Murano's debut work after he left Setsu Watanabe's office. Completed in 1931 the Morigo building was a seven storey office building situated in Nihonbashi, Tokyo. The baked salt tiles on the façade give it a warmer presence to the street than would normally be expected for a building of its size. The regularly spaced windows sit flush to external face of the wall and this along with the curved corner and expressed eaves-line reduce visual clutter and give the building clean lines. In 1960 an eighth floor was added but this has not been detrimental to the overall appearance.

== Ube City Public Hall ==
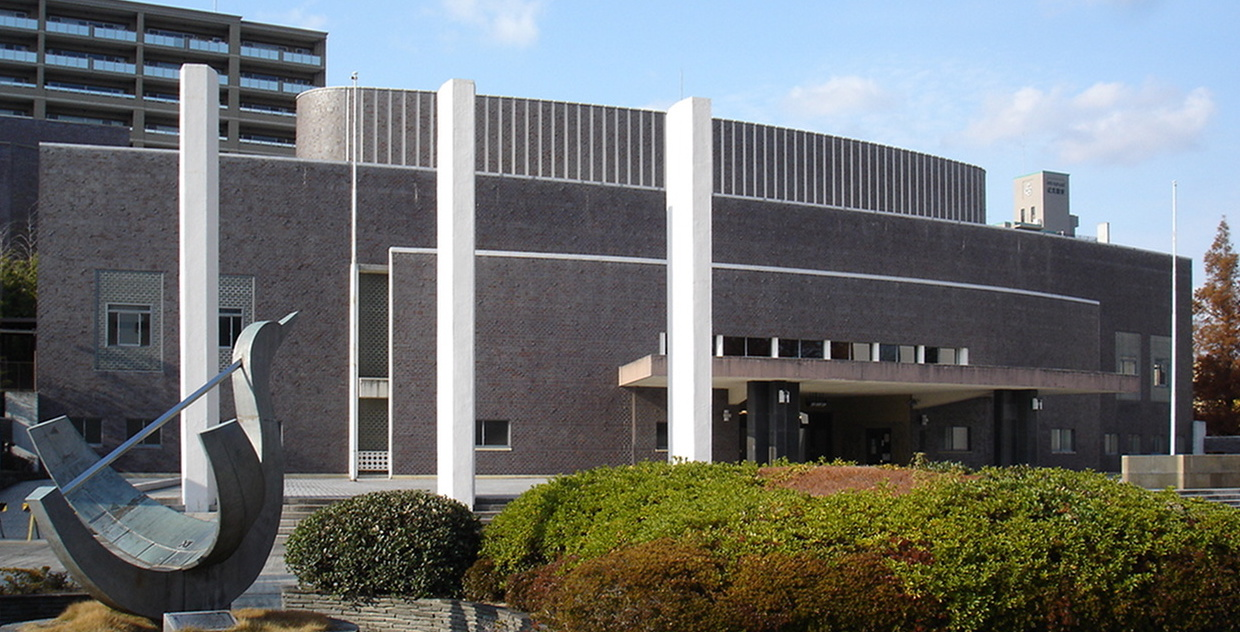
Former Ube City Public Hall, 1937, main entrance and six free-standing concrete columns

To celebrate 40 years in industry, Ube Industries donated this building to the city of Ube in 1937 to commemorate its founder Yūsaku Watanabe. The complex was designed around a fan shape with the backstage areas at the pinch point of the fan radiating in turn out to the stage, auditorium and entrance plaza. Six free-standing concrete finned columns (three to each side) frame the main entrance and represent each of the six affiliated companies who donated money for the building. Originally the tiles on the three concentric circles of the main façade had a salt-glazed finish in burnt carmine, but during restoration work in 1994 they were replaced with reductive fired tiles in burnt umber. The exposed concrete columns were also painted at that time.

The interior of the building reveals more decorative details than the volumetric exterior. Massive circular columns support curving spaces that are lit by indirect natural daylight. The reverse-slab construction of the roof was a pioneer of its day and both the acoustics and visibility are recognised as being excellent.

== Memorial Cathedral for World Peace ==
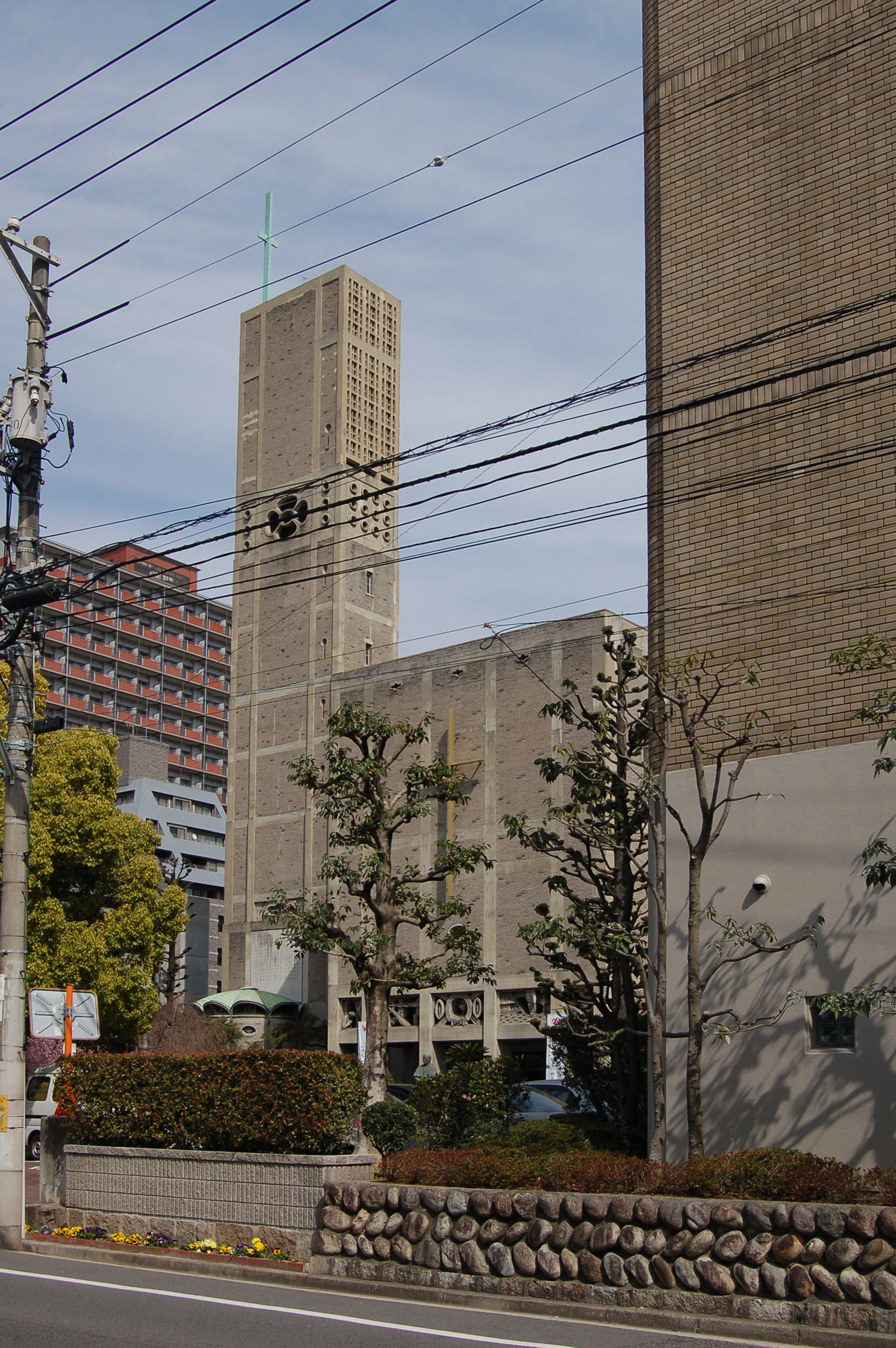
Memorial Cathedral for World Peace, Hiroshima, 1954, by Togo Murano and Masashi Kondo

The original Catholic cathedral in this location was destroyed in the atomic bomb explosion in 1945. A design competition was launched in 1947 to find an architect for its replacement. A total of 177 designs were submitted from Japanese architects such as Kenzo Tange and Kunio Maekawa, but no overall winner was declared. Murano ended up doing the design although he was actually one of the jurors.

The cathedral is situated between Tange's Peace Memorial Park and JR Hiroshima Station. The volumetric treatment of the design was influenced by Auguste Perret, whereas the inclusion of a circular dome over the sanctuary and small cylindrical chapels on either side of the main volume are echoes of Byzantine architecture. The post-and-beam concrete frame with internal panels is reminiscent of traditional Japanese architecture as are the shapes of the windows penetrating the tower. The brick infills in this case were made from earth containing ashes from the atomic bomb and are laid so that their rough surfaces cast shadows across the façade. Architect Kenji Imai designed the sculptures above the main door. Murano undertook a number of religious projects after this one and converted to Catholicism later in life.

== Kasuien, Miyako Hotel ==
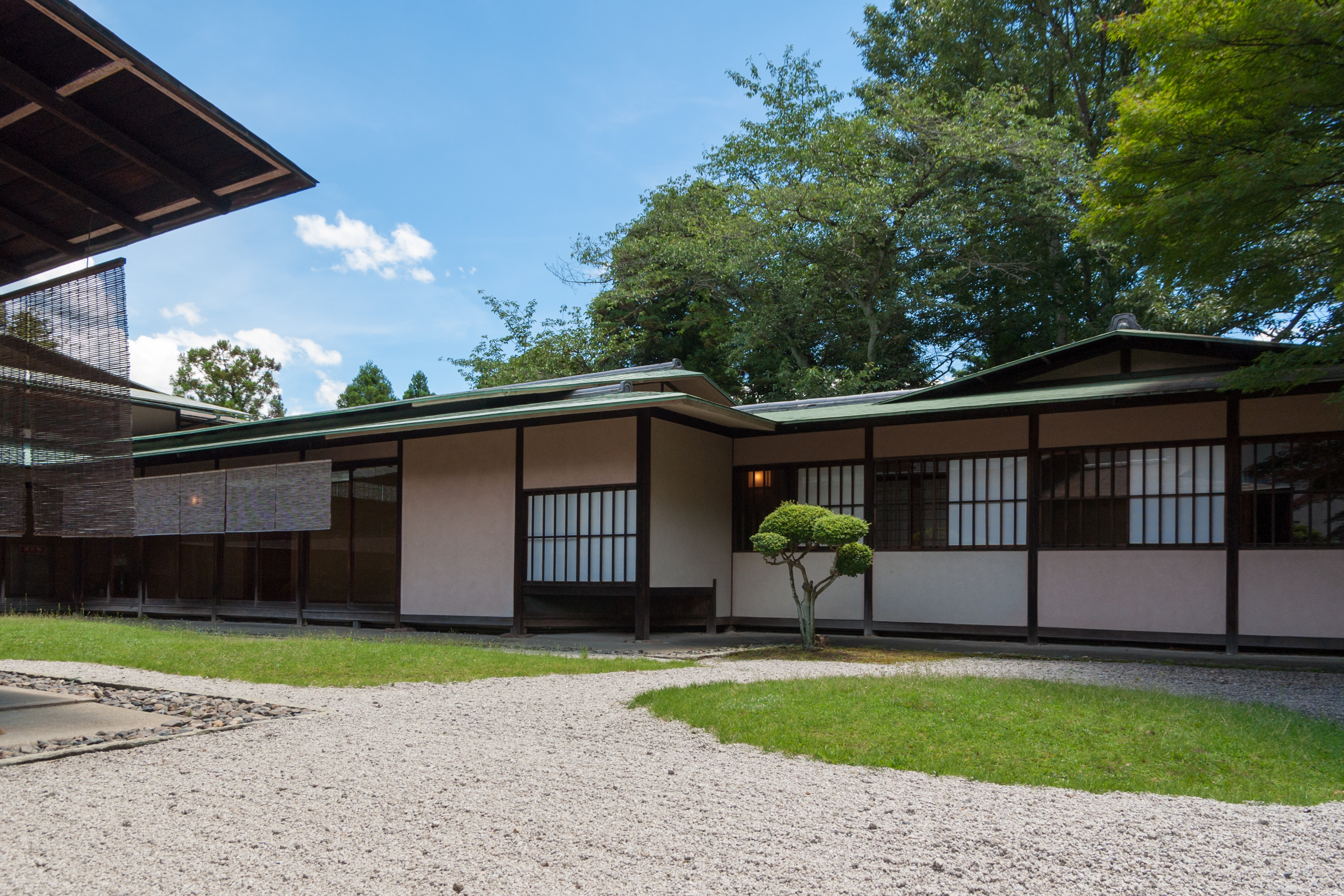
Kasuien, Miyako Hotel, Kyoto, 1959

Murano designed this annex to the Miyako Hotel in Kyoto in a sukiya style. The site plan of Kasuien is laid out to enclose a garden and was inspired by Kyoto's Daigo-ji. The annex is set out as a series of pavilions set within the sloped landscape and connected by enclosed walkways. Although the overtone of the design is one of the Sukiya tradition, ordered by the principles of the tea ceremony, Murano grafted onto this his own modern interpretation by the use of materials like steel and concrete as the primary structure. He used these materials to change otherwise traditional details making them slimmer and lighter.

== Nishinomiya Trappist Monastery ==
The Nishinomiya Trappist Monastery designed in 1969 is situated in the Rokko Mountains in Japan. It is home to about 90 sisters. The building is located on a sloped site in woodland and is planned around an elevated cloister onto which the building elements face. Although it has been compared to Le Corbusier's La Tourette it differs by having a much more intimate relationship with its natural surroundings and a lighter façade.

== Selected projects ==
- 1931 Morigo Company Tokyo branch
- 1936 Sogo Department Store, Osaka
- 1937 Ube City Public Hal
- 1954 Memorial Cathedral for World Peace
- 1959 Kasuien, The Miyako Hotel
- 1959 Yokohama City Hall, Yokohama
- 1969 Nishinomiya Trappist Monastery
- 1980 Takarazuka City Hall, Takarazuka
- 1983 Tanimura Art Museum, Itoigawa

== Gallery ==
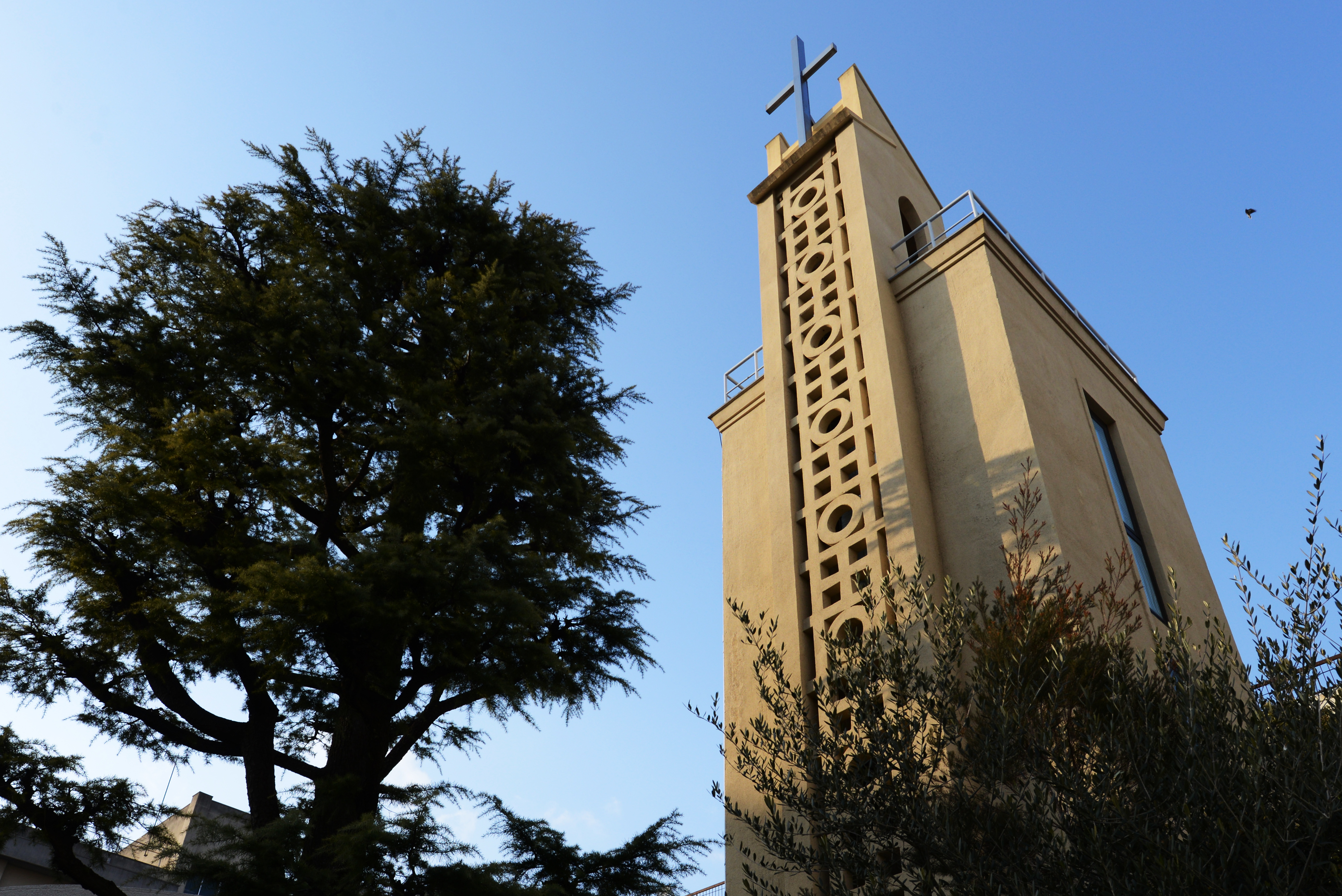
Tower of Minami Osaka Church, 1928

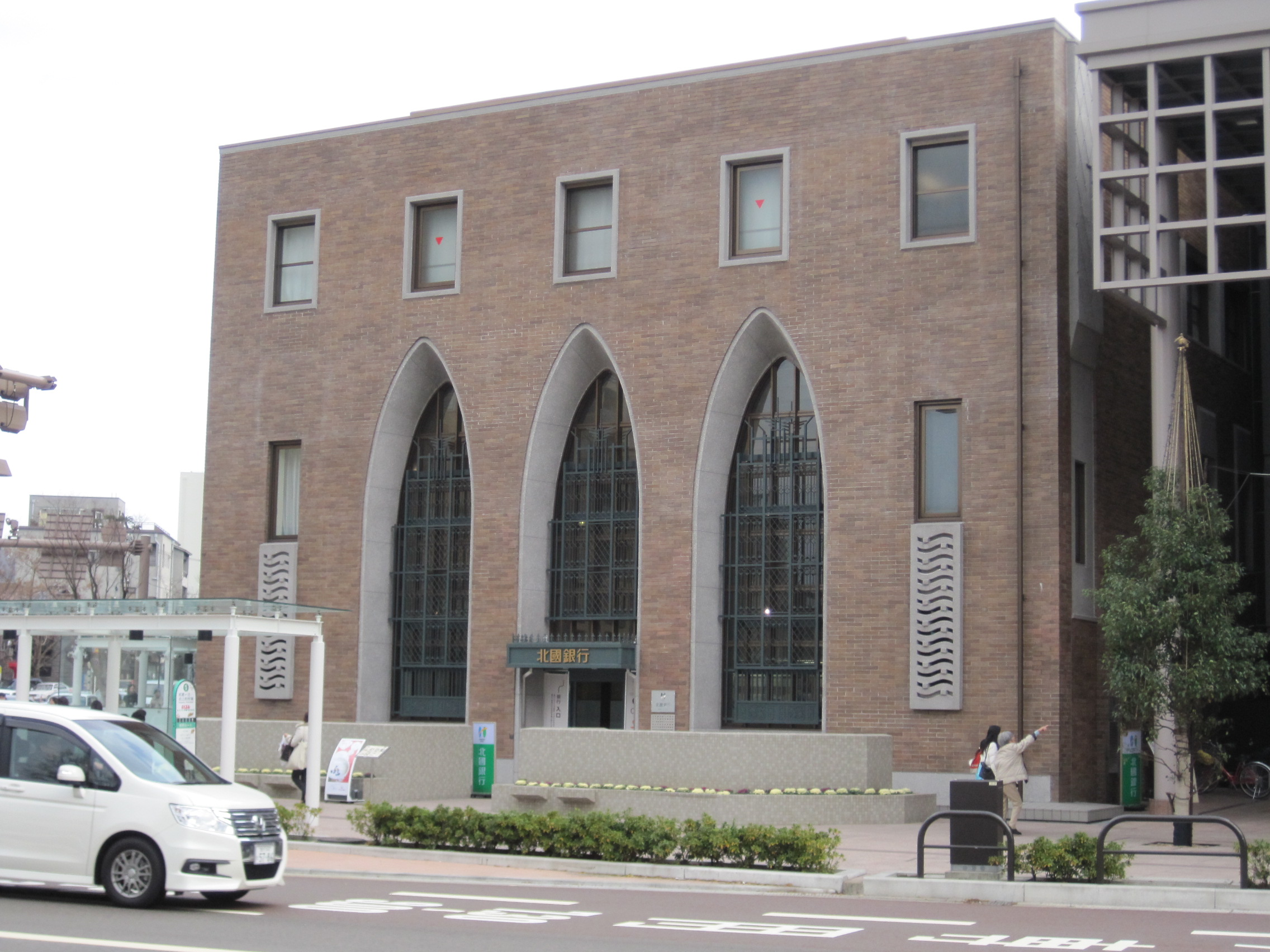
Kanno Joint Bank HQ, Kanazawa, 1932

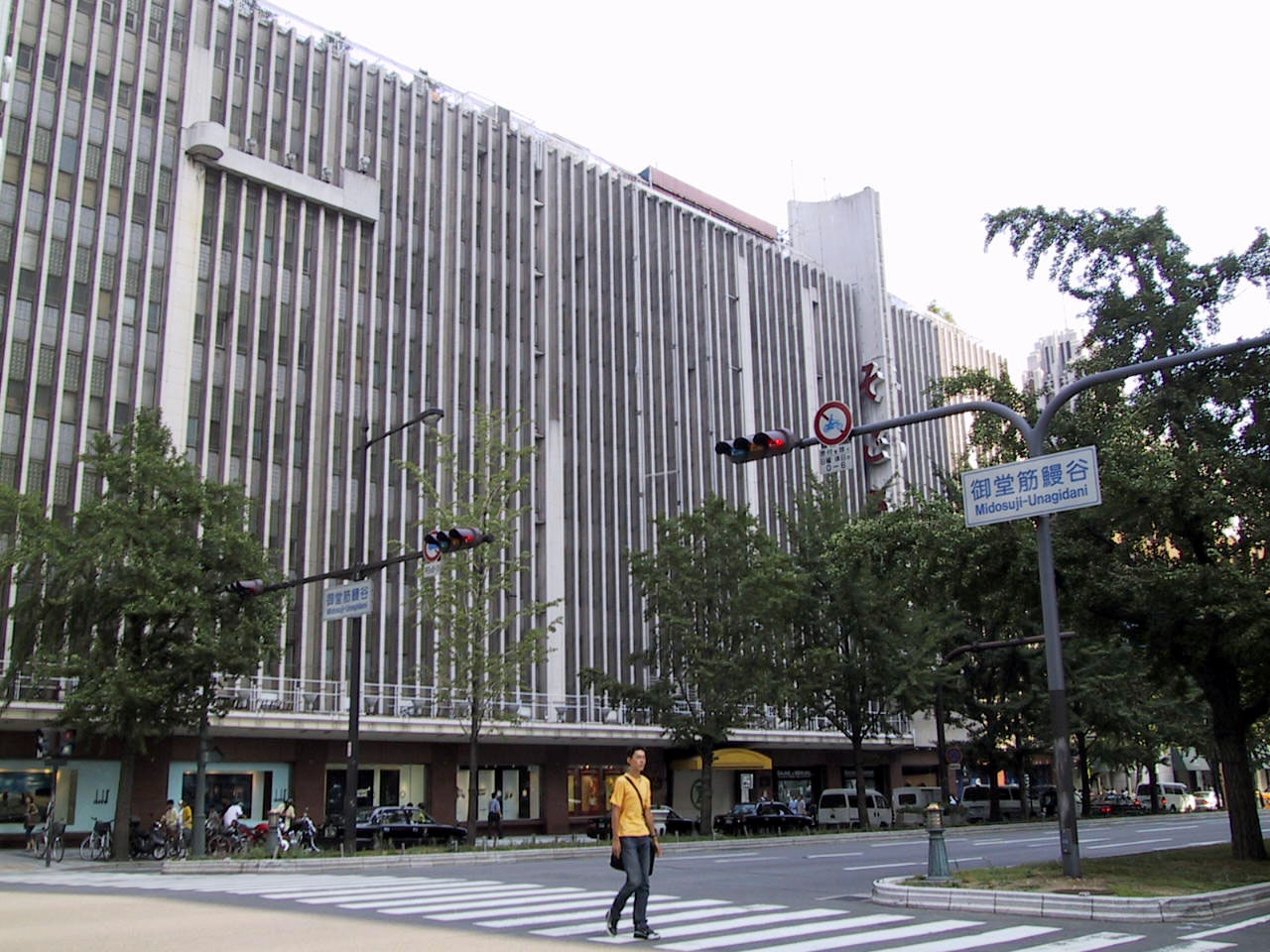
Sogo Department Store, Osaka, 1935

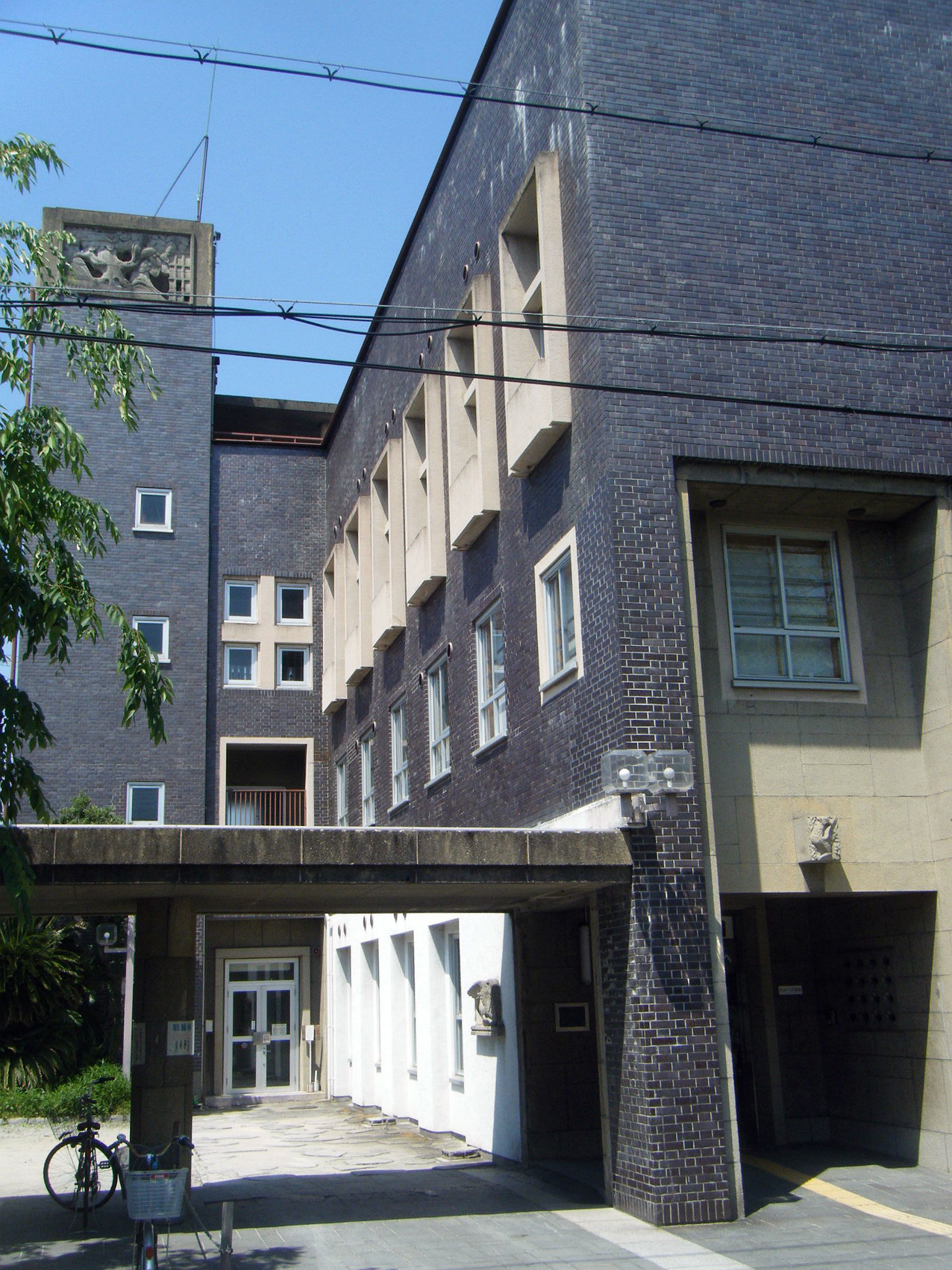
Osho Town Hall, Amagasaki, 1938

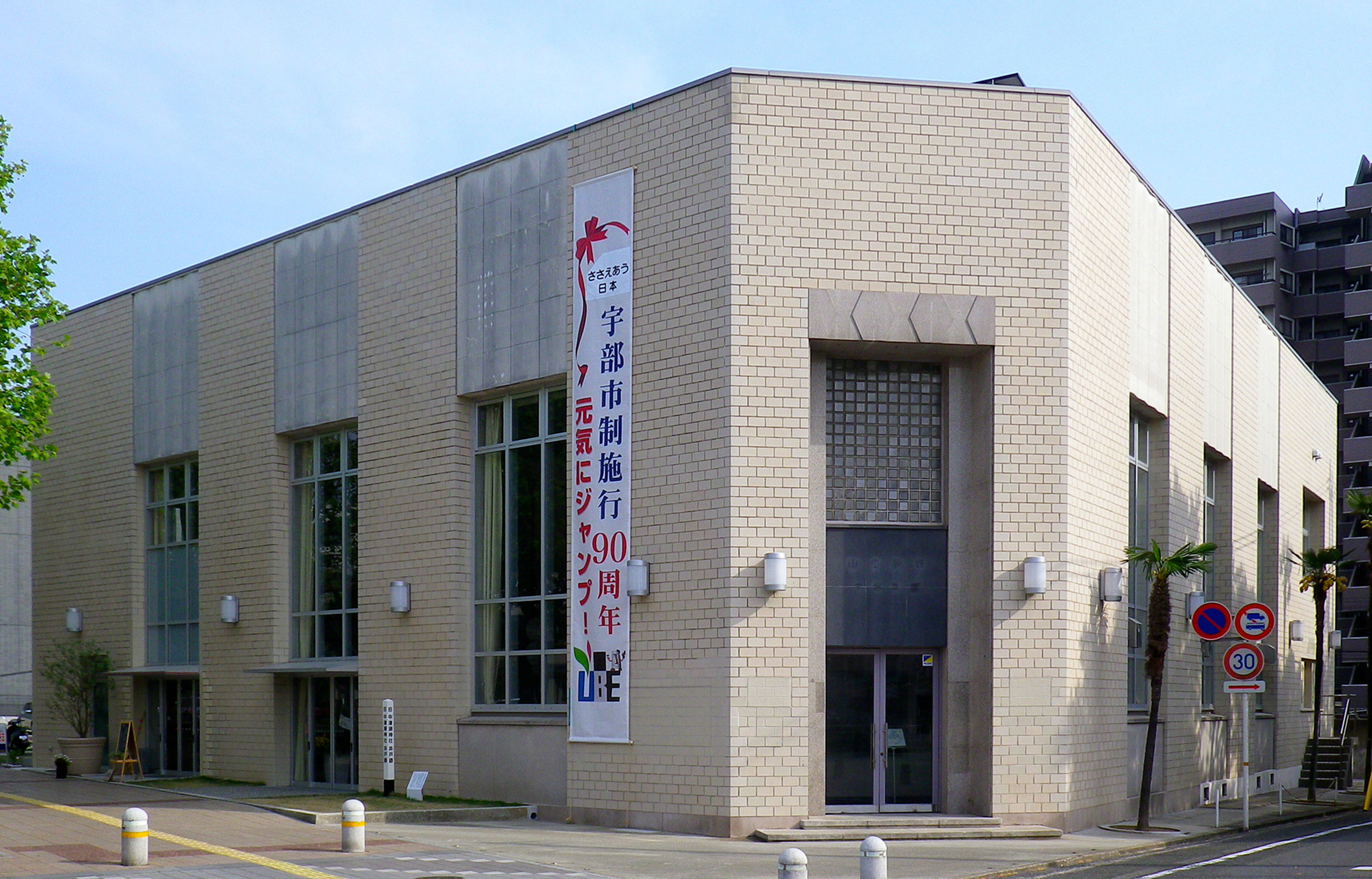
Ube Bank HQ, 1939

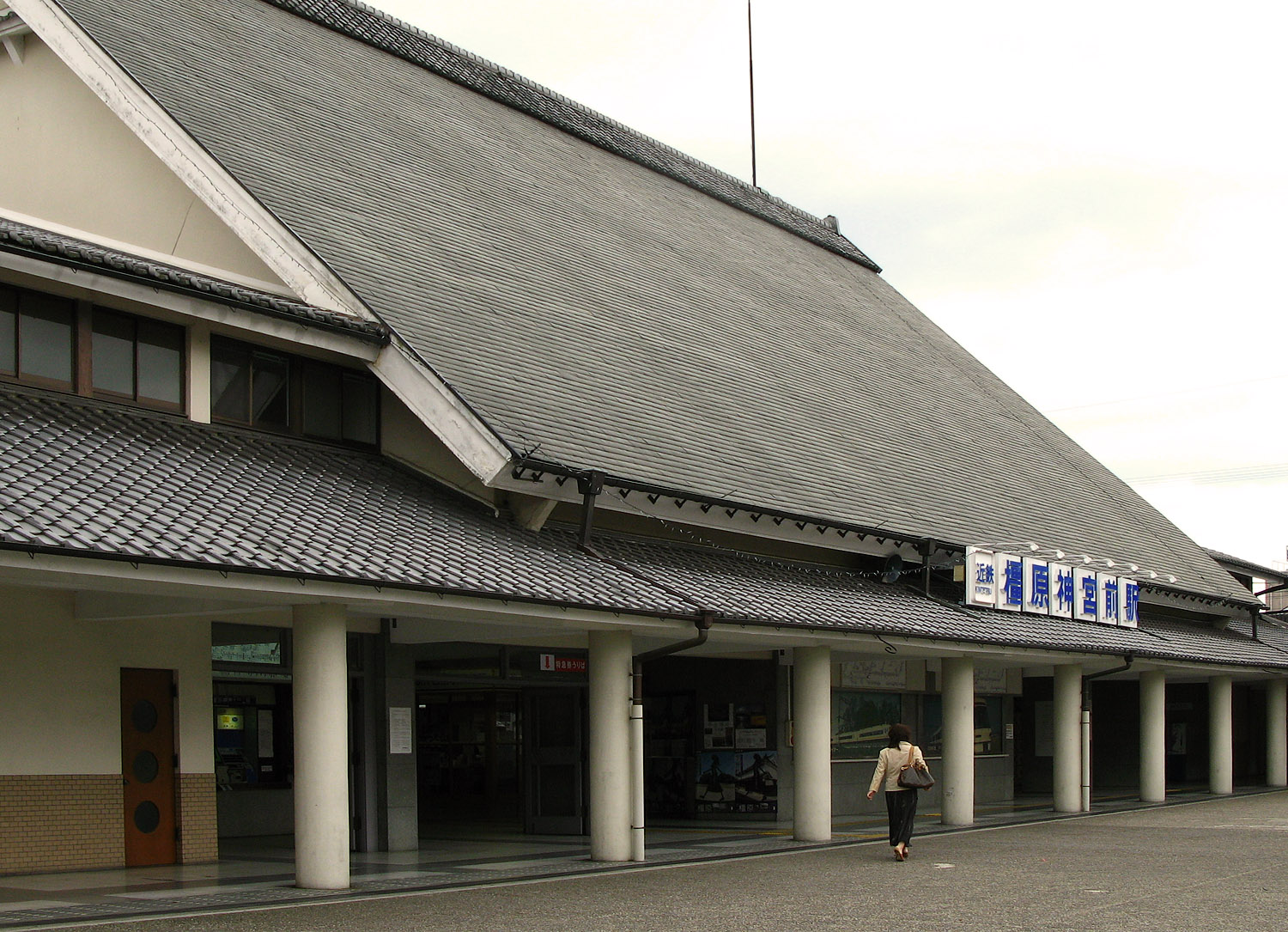
Kashiharajingū-mae Station, 1940

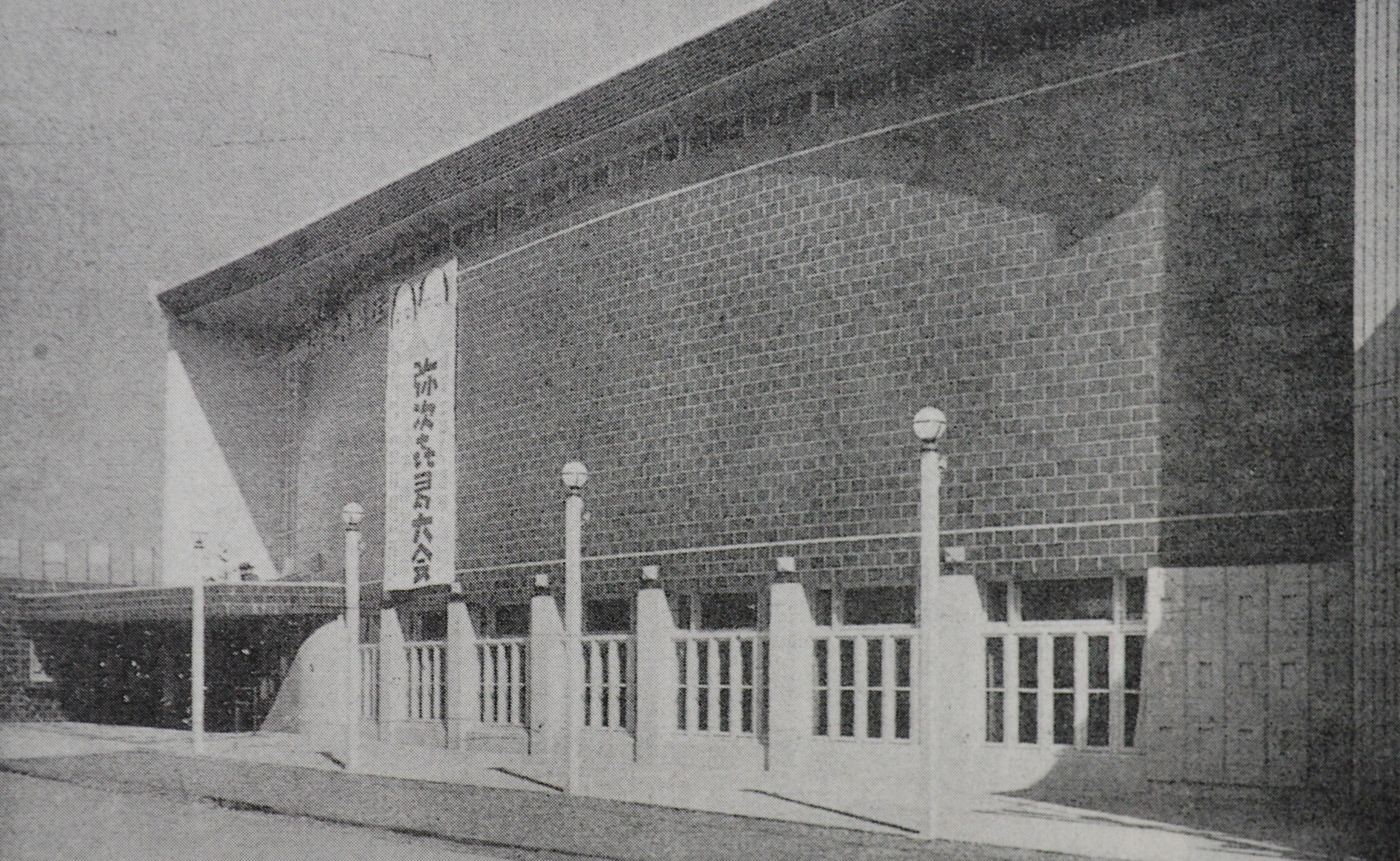
Kabukiza, Shizuoka, 1941

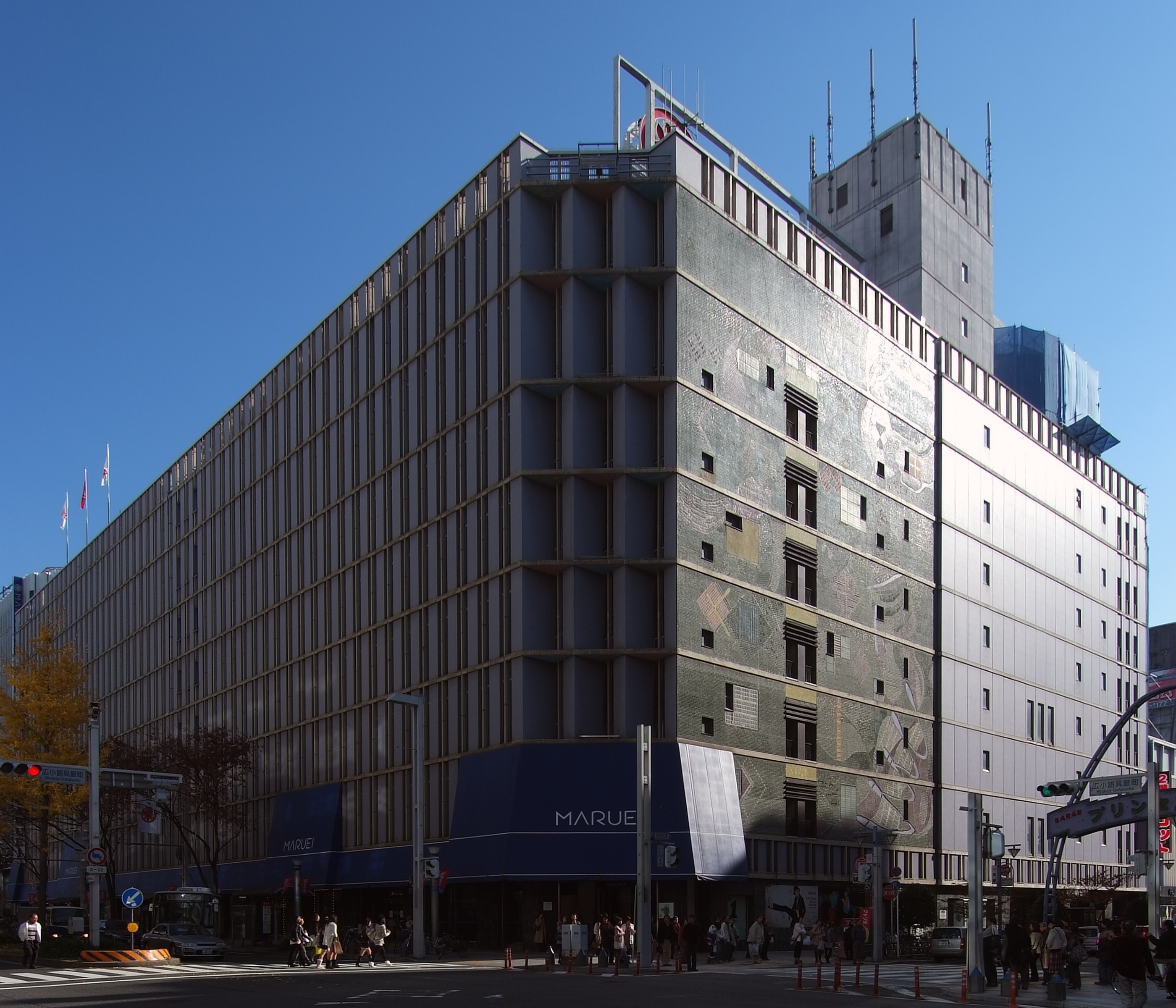
Maruei Department Store, Nagoya, 1953

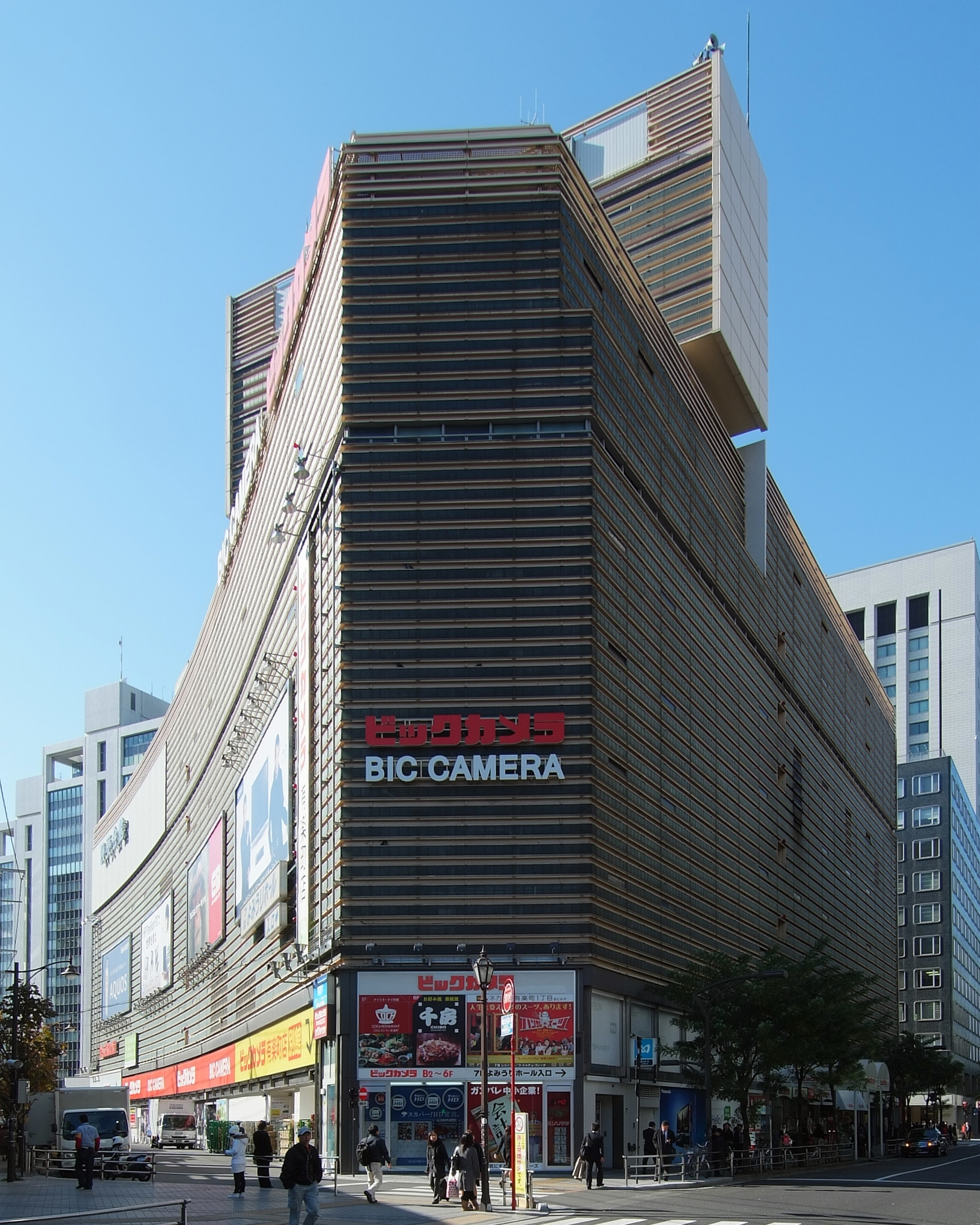
Yomiuri Hall, at Yurakucho Tokyo, 1957

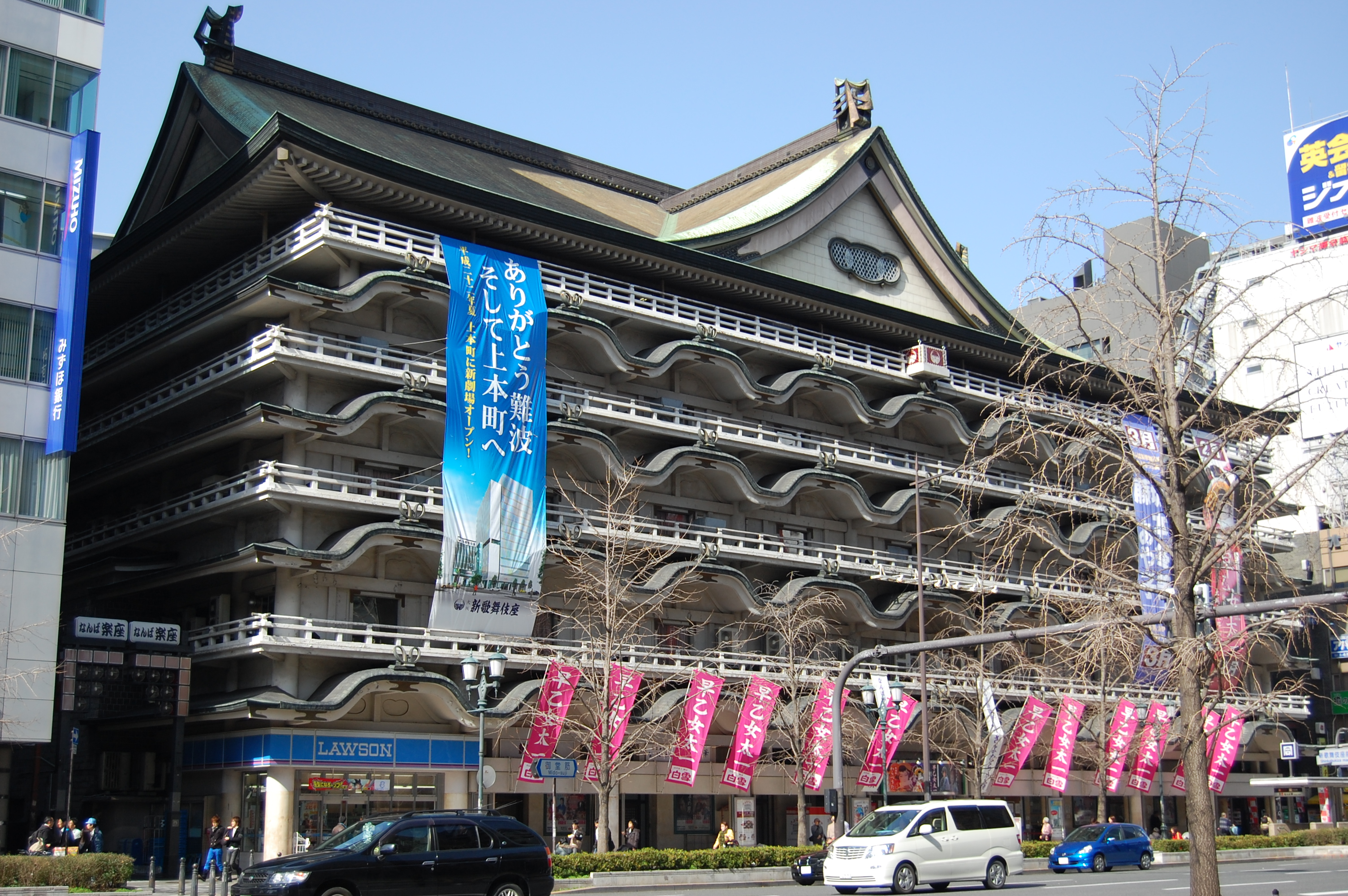
Shin Kabukiza theater, Osaka, 1958 (demolished 2015)

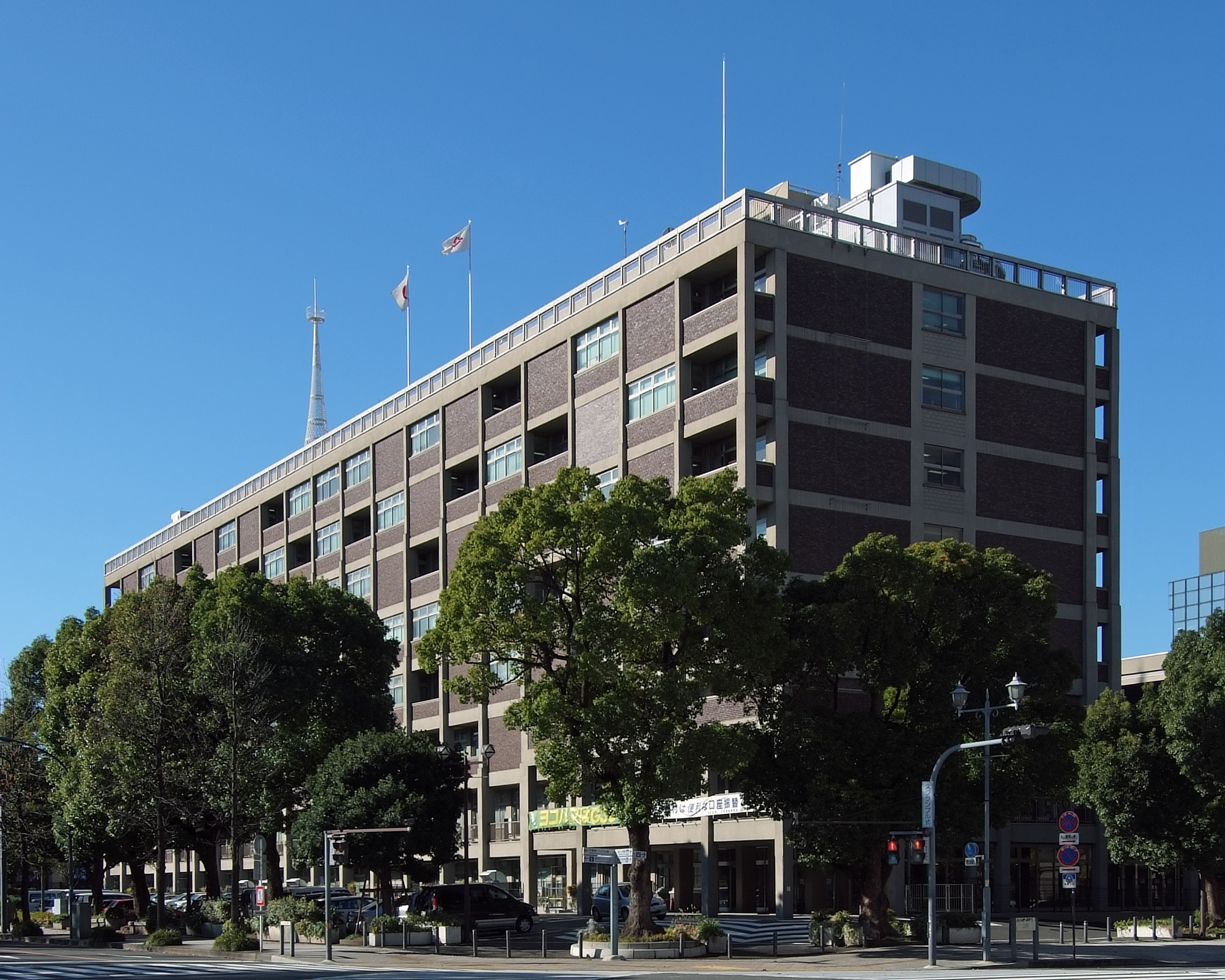
Yokohama City Hall, at Yokohama Kanagawa, 1959

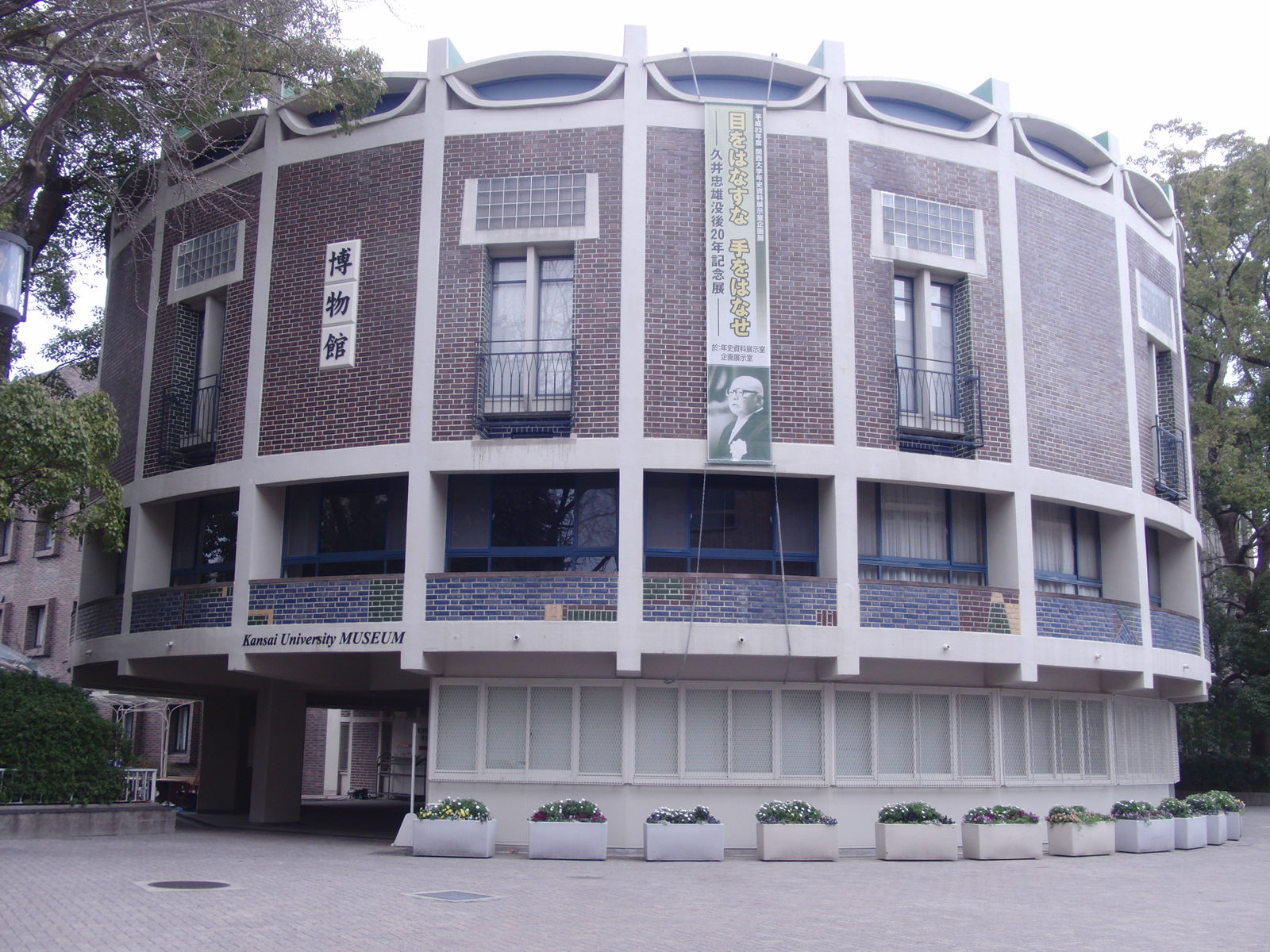
Former Round Library, Kansai University, 1959

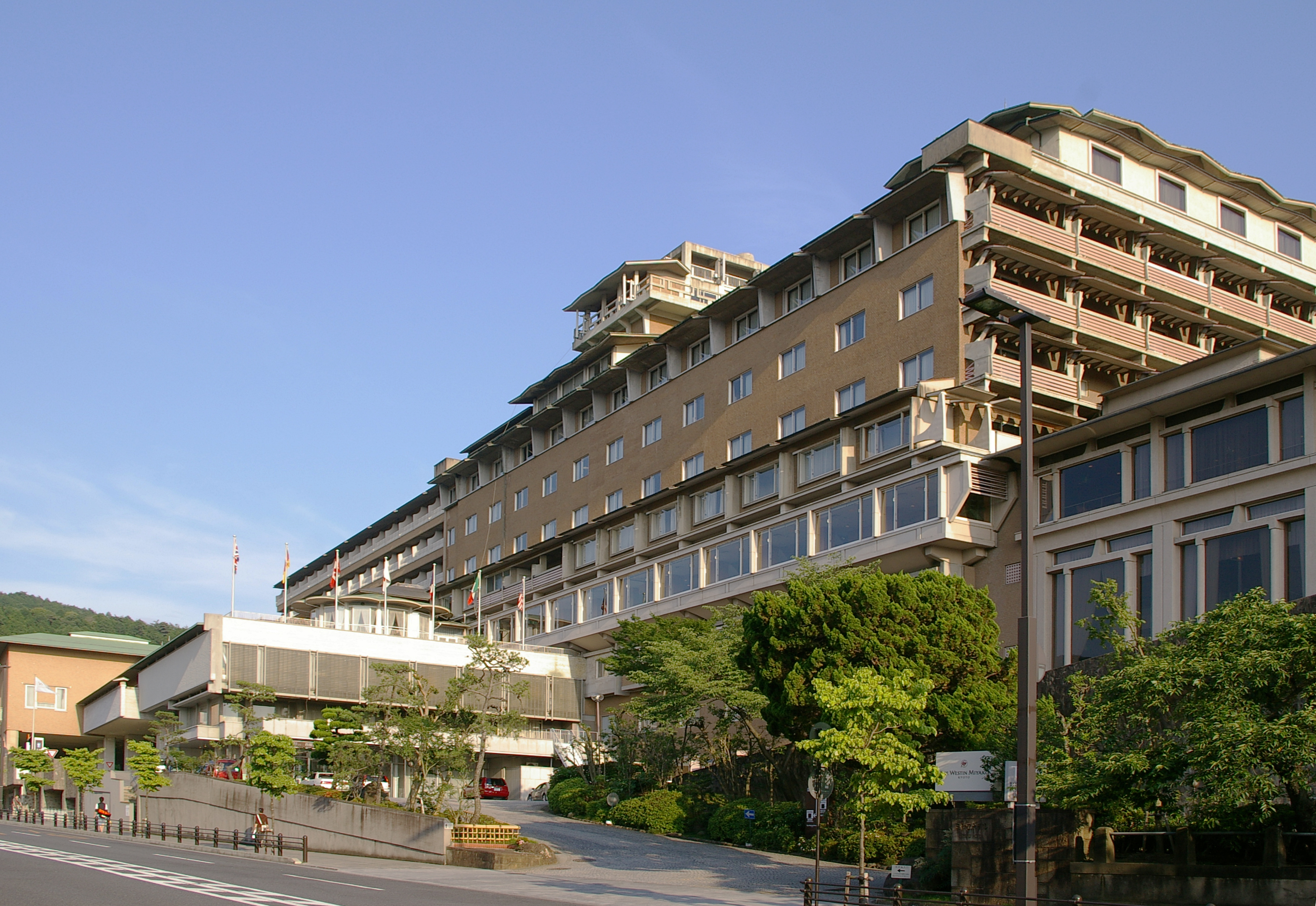
Westin Miyako Hotel, Kyoto, main building, 1960

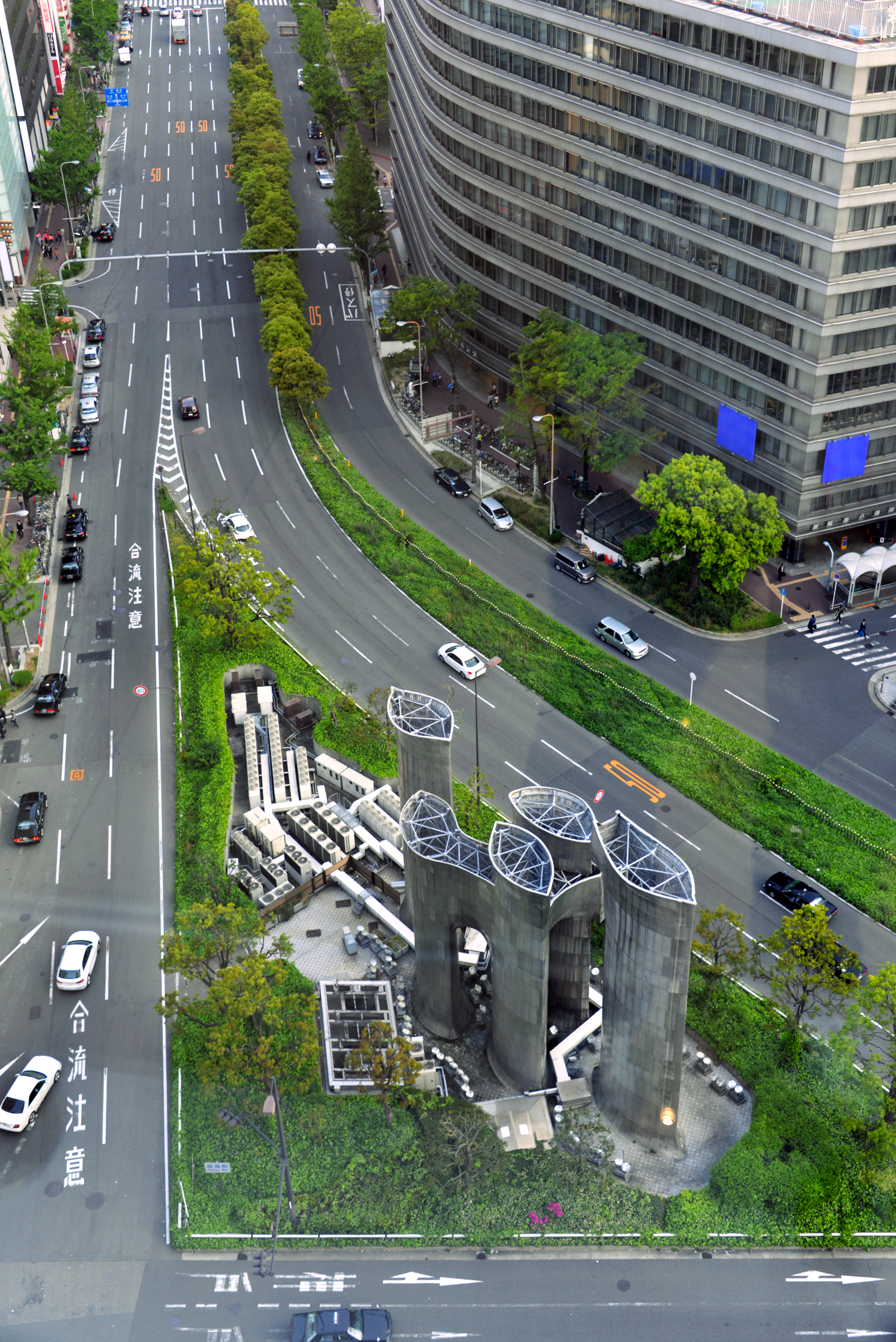
Umeda Ventilation Tower, Osaka, 1963

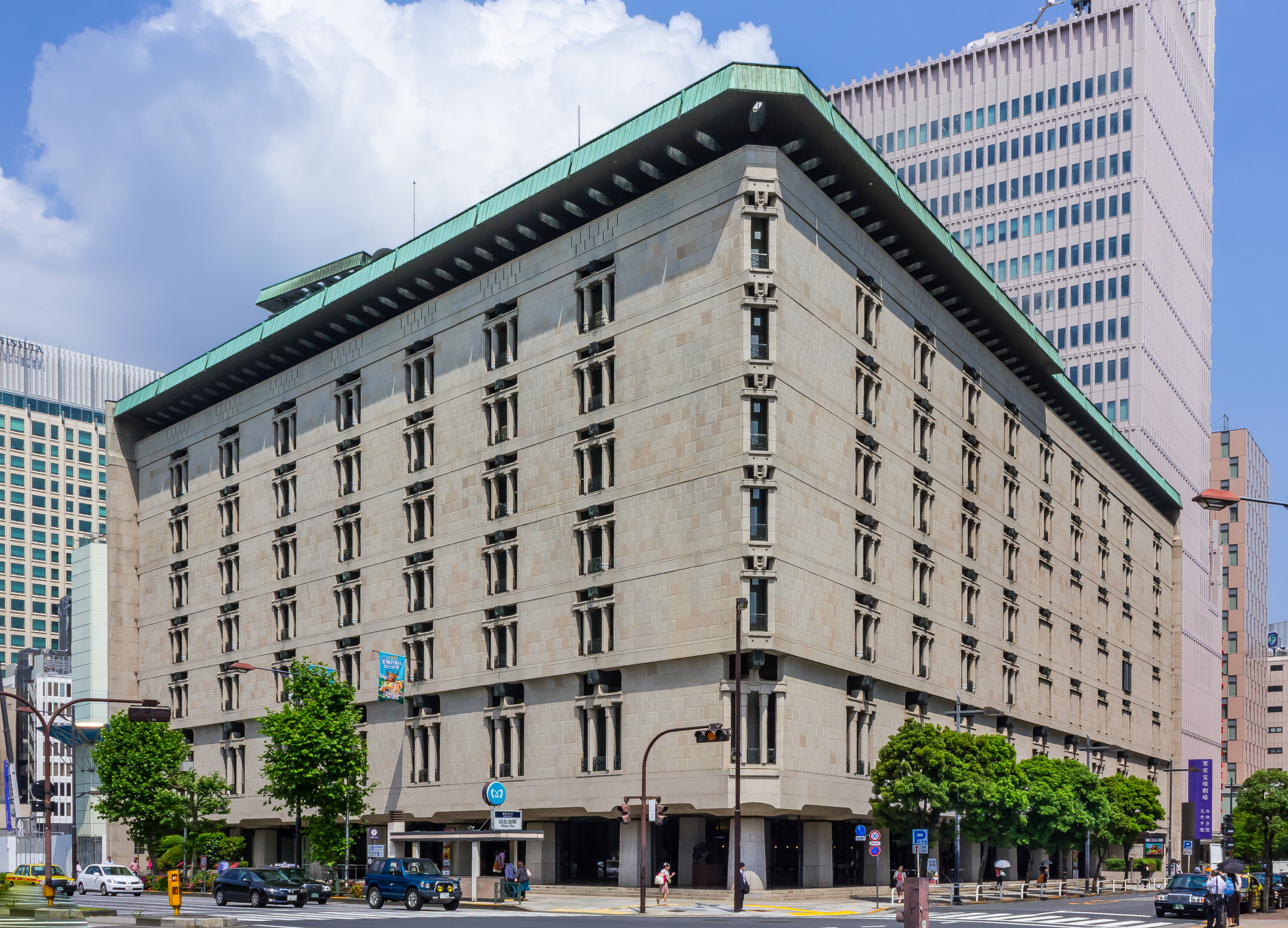
Nissei Theater, Tokyo, 1963

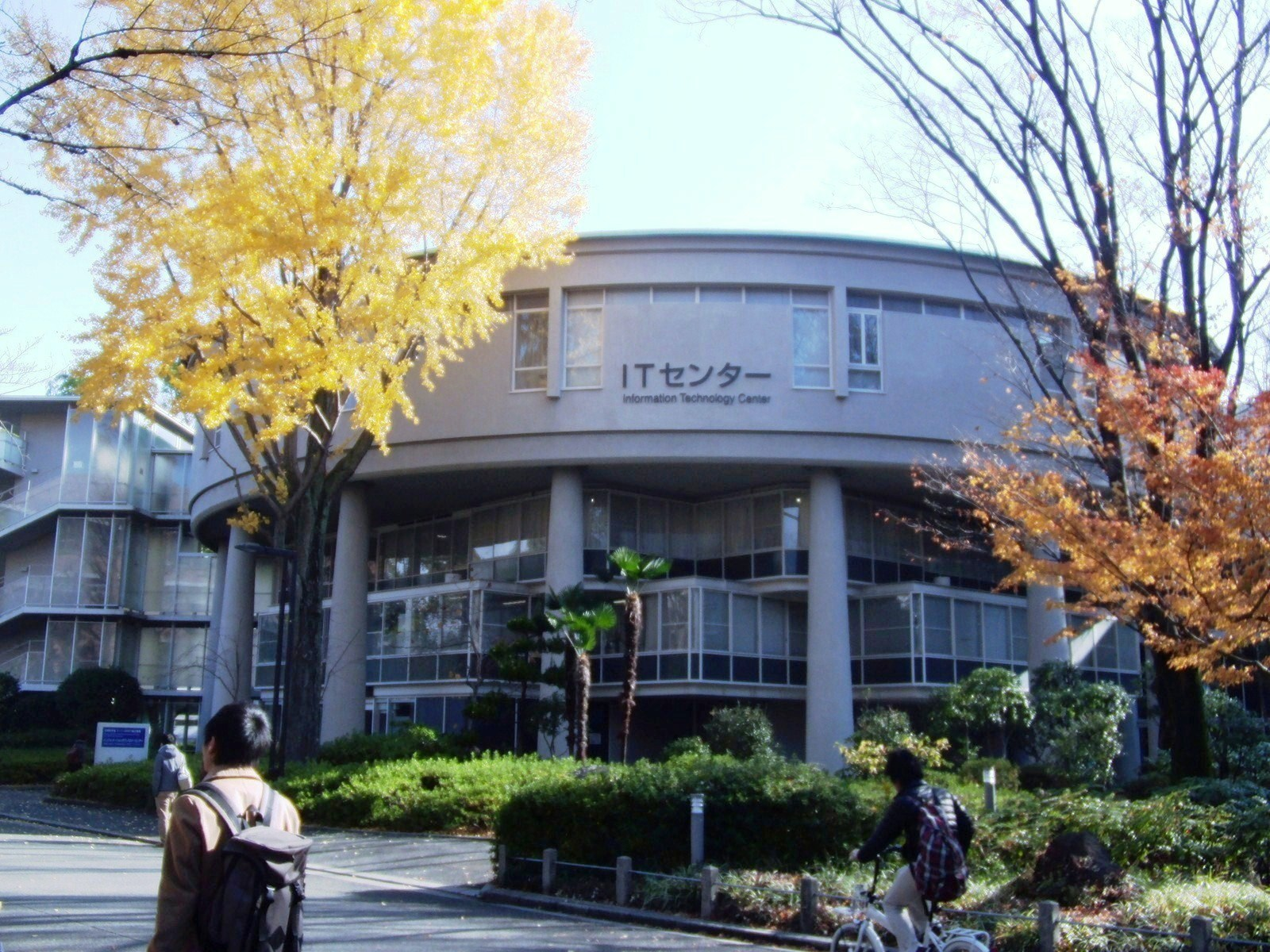
Former Specialists' Library, Kansai University, 1964

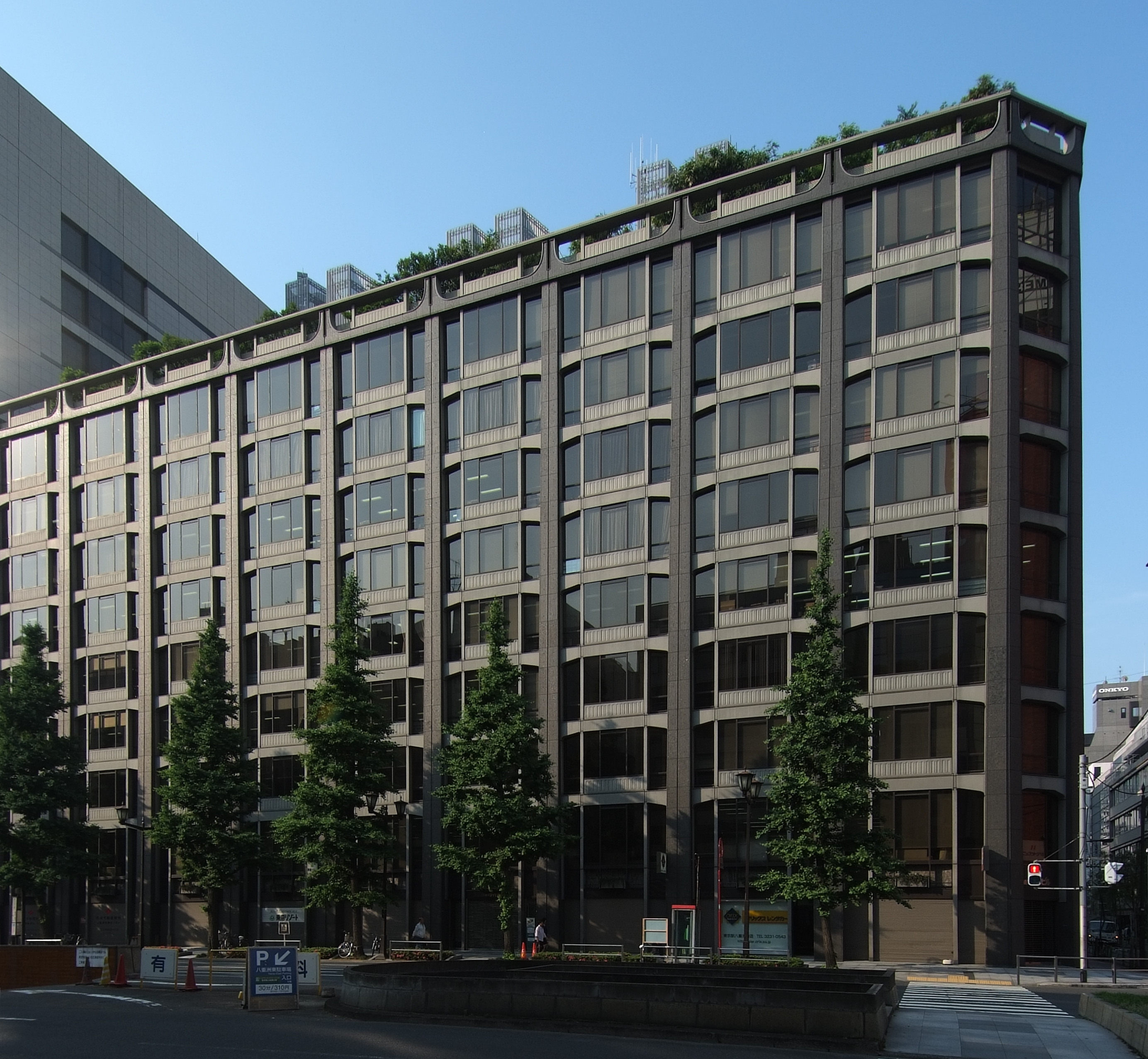
Yaesu Daibiru, at Chuo-ku Tokyo, 1965

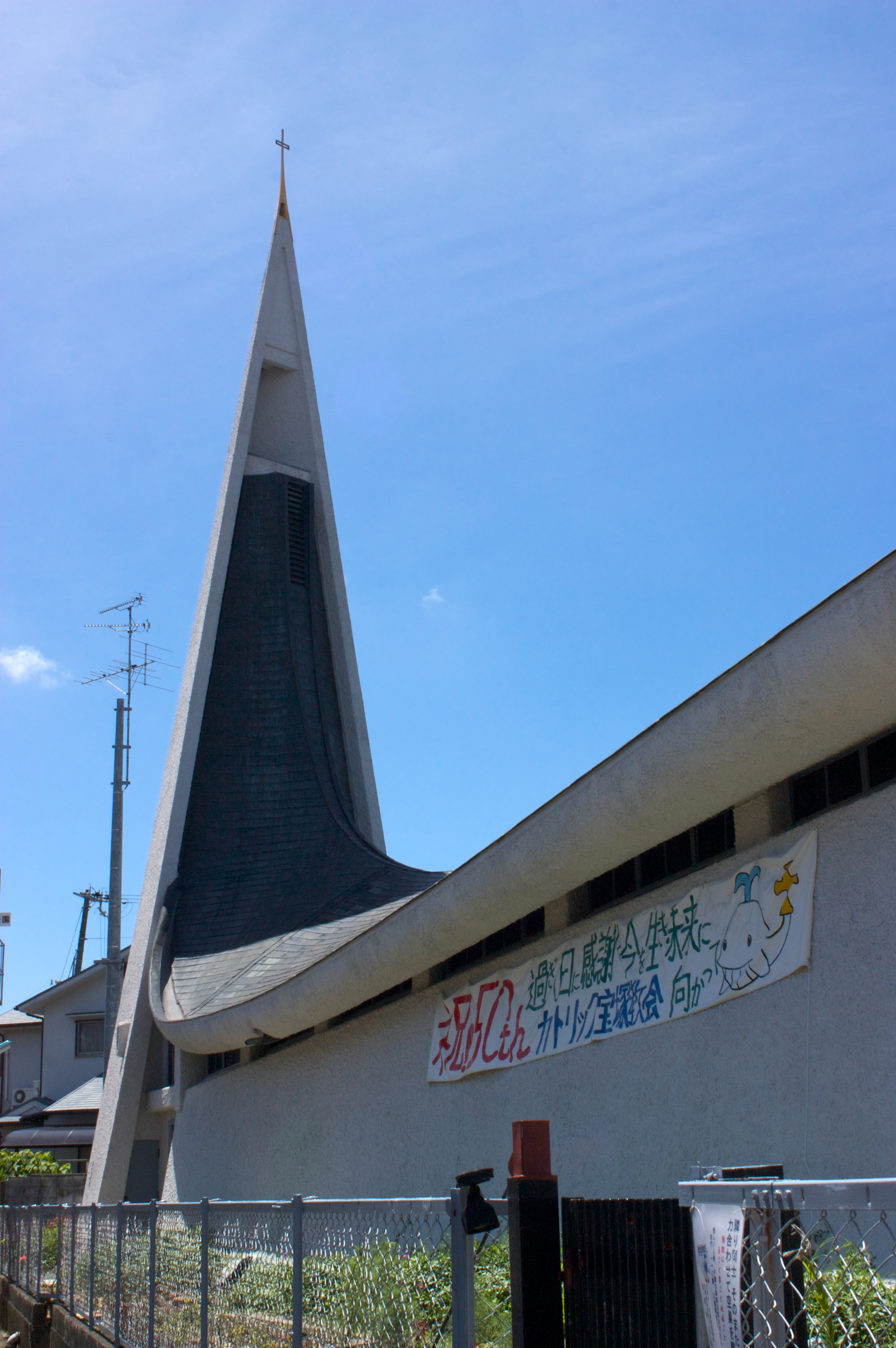
Takarazuka Church, 1966

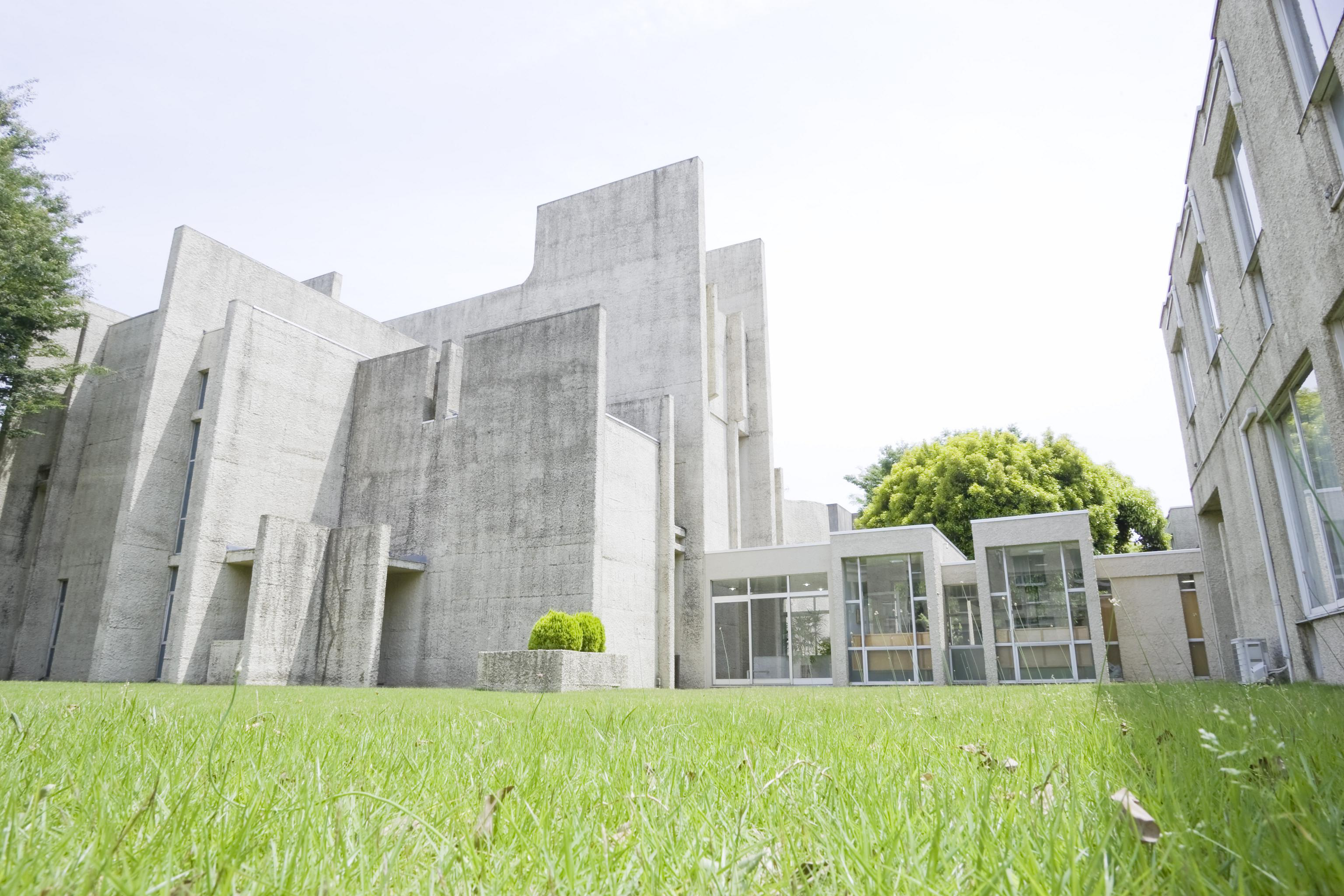
Japan Lutheran Theological College, Tokyo, 1969

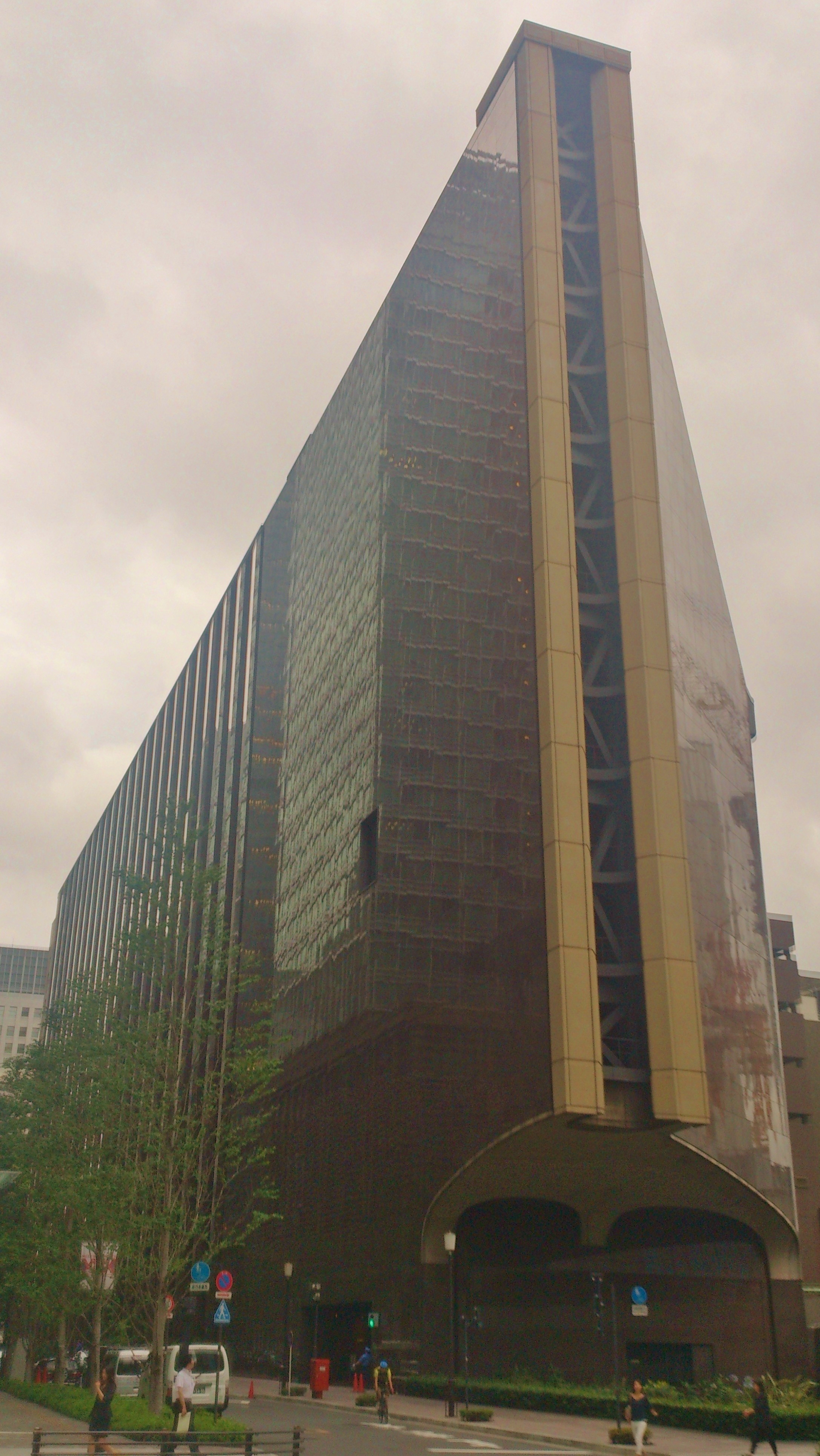
Old Industrial Bank of Japan HQ, at Marunouchi Tokyo, 1974

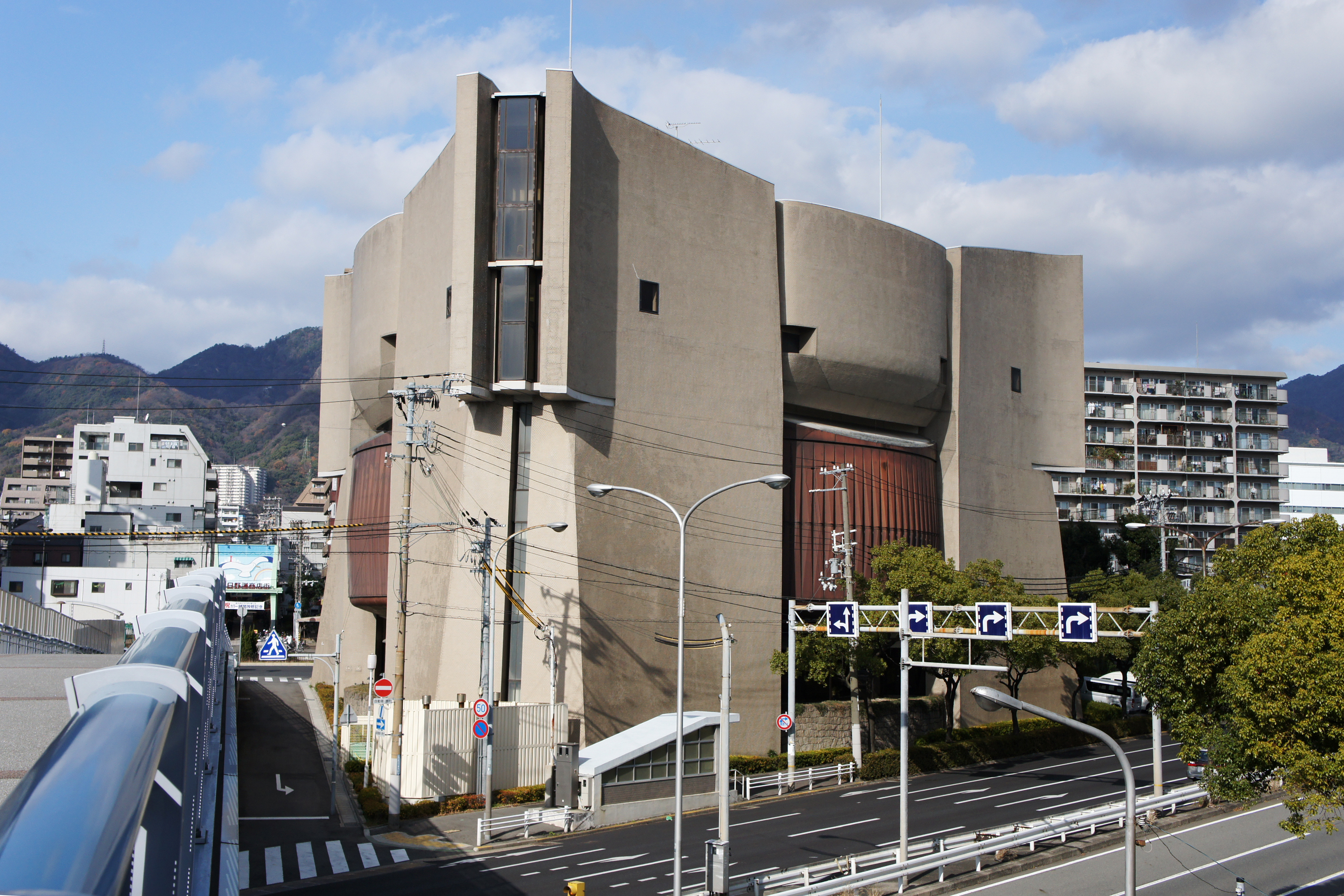
Nishiyama Memorial Hall, Kobe, 1975 (demolished 2012)

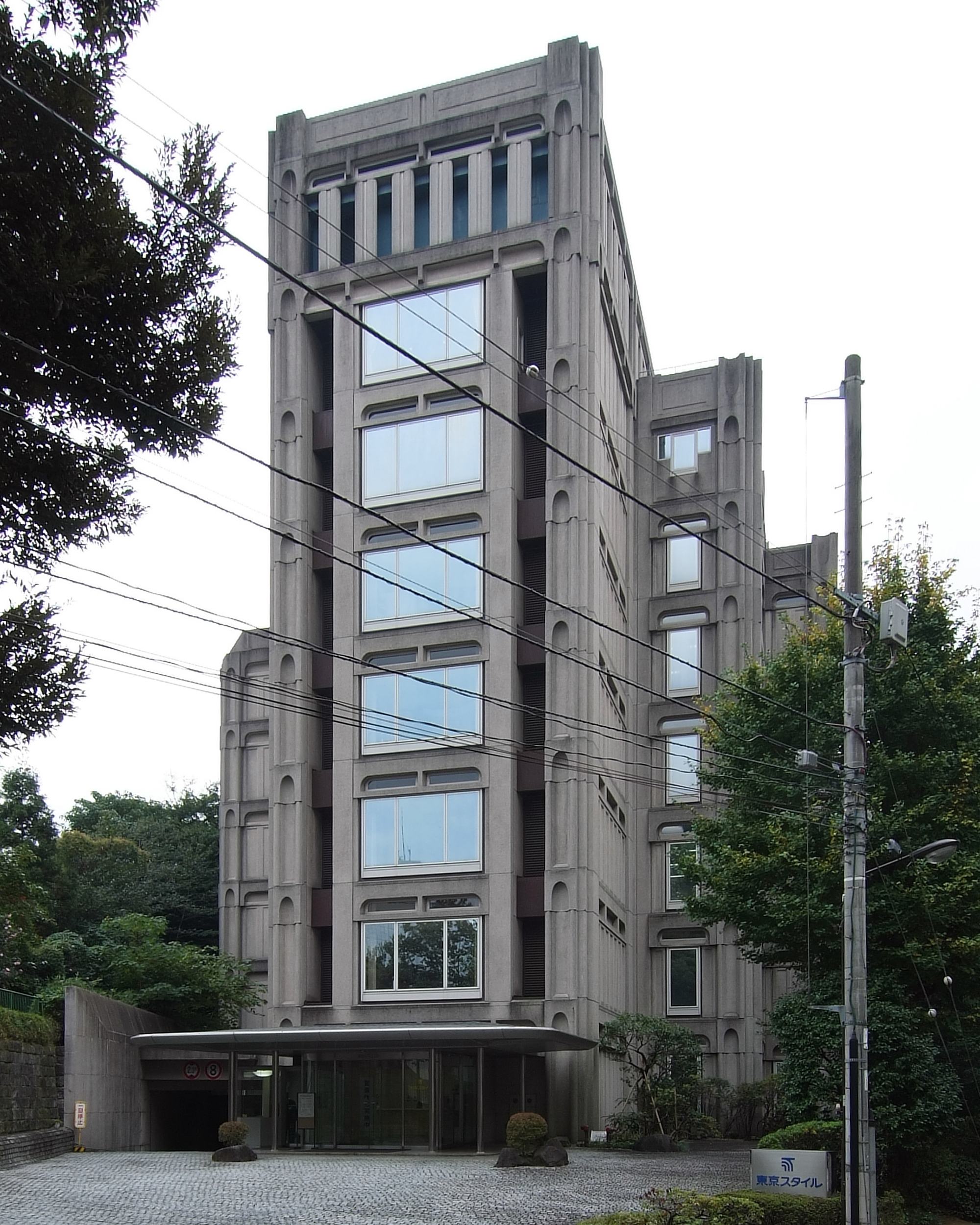
Daibiru Kōjimachi, Tokyo, 1976

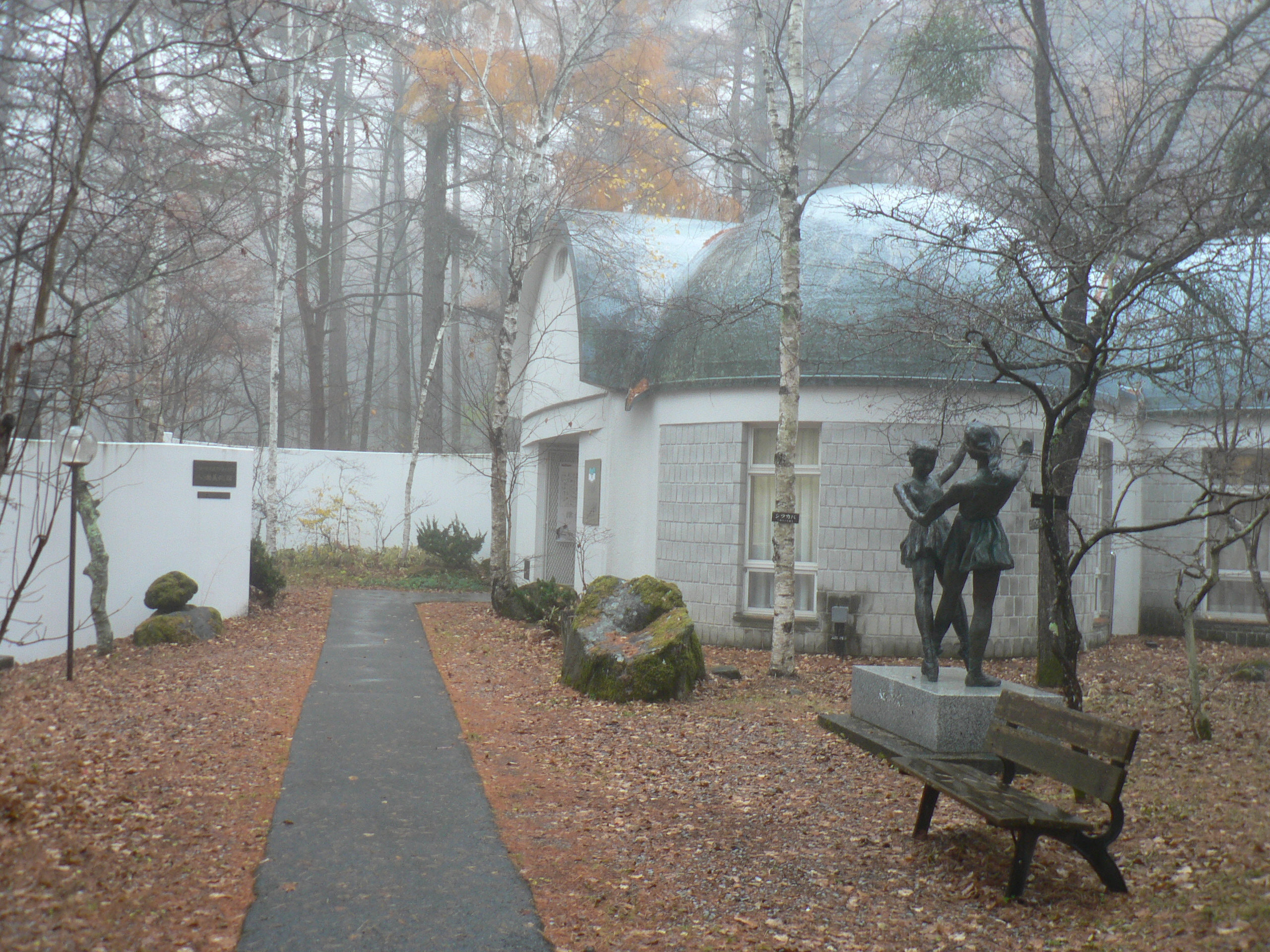
Yatsugatake Art Museum, 1979

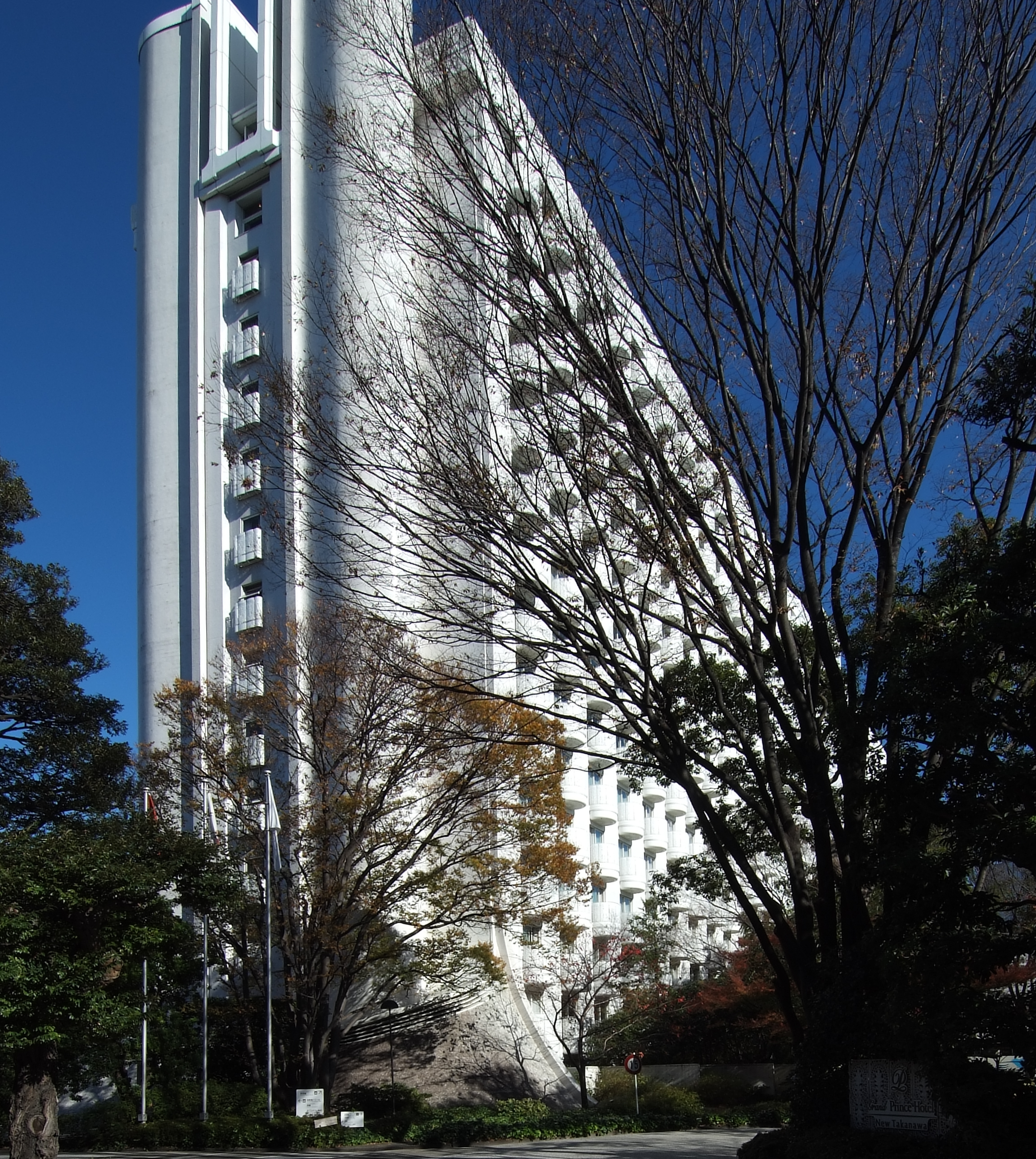
Grand Prince Hotel New Takanaya, 1982

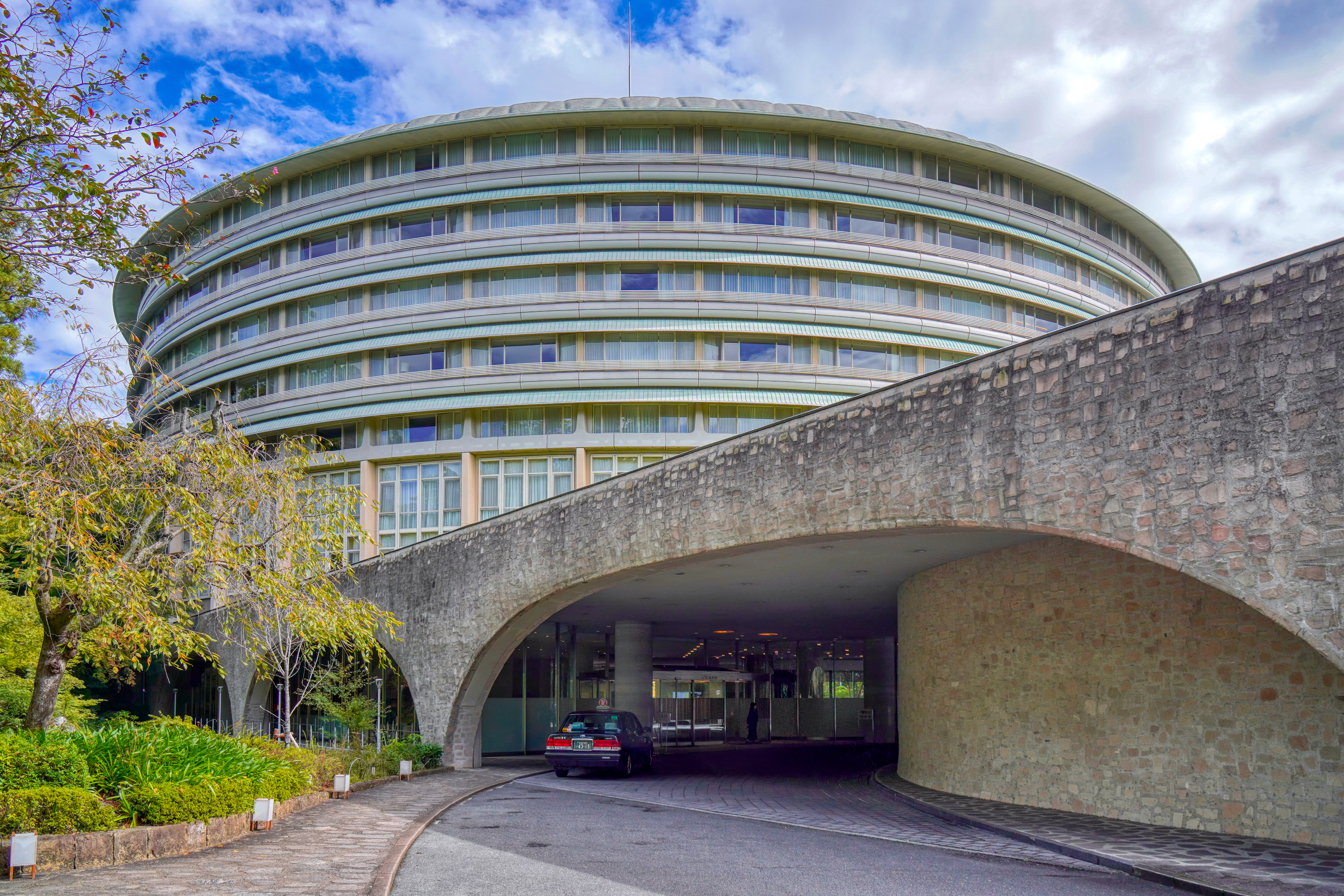
The Prince Kyoto Takaragaike, 1986
