= Kenji Imai (architect) =

Japanese architect and professor

Kenji Imai (今井 兼次, Imai Kenji; 11 January 1895 - 20 May 1987) was a Japanese architect and professor.

== Biography ==
Imai was born on 11 January 1895, in Tokyo. He went to Waseda University in Tokyo and graduated with a degree in architecture.

He travelled to the USSR, Scandinavia, Italy and Spain in 1926. He met Walter Gropius, Le Corbusier, Ernst May and others, which asserted an influence on his way of thinking and his architectural style. Like Togo Murano and Takamasa Yoshizaka who also trained at Waseda University, Imai had a style which can be categorized as Expressionist. Impressed with the works of Antoni Gaudi, he proceeded to promote him in Japan and elsewhere.

He also introduced the work of the Austrian mystic, Rudolf Steiner to Japan.

In 1948 his wife Maria Shimko died and he converted to Catholicism.

Imai died on 20 May 1987, in Tokyo.

== Works ==
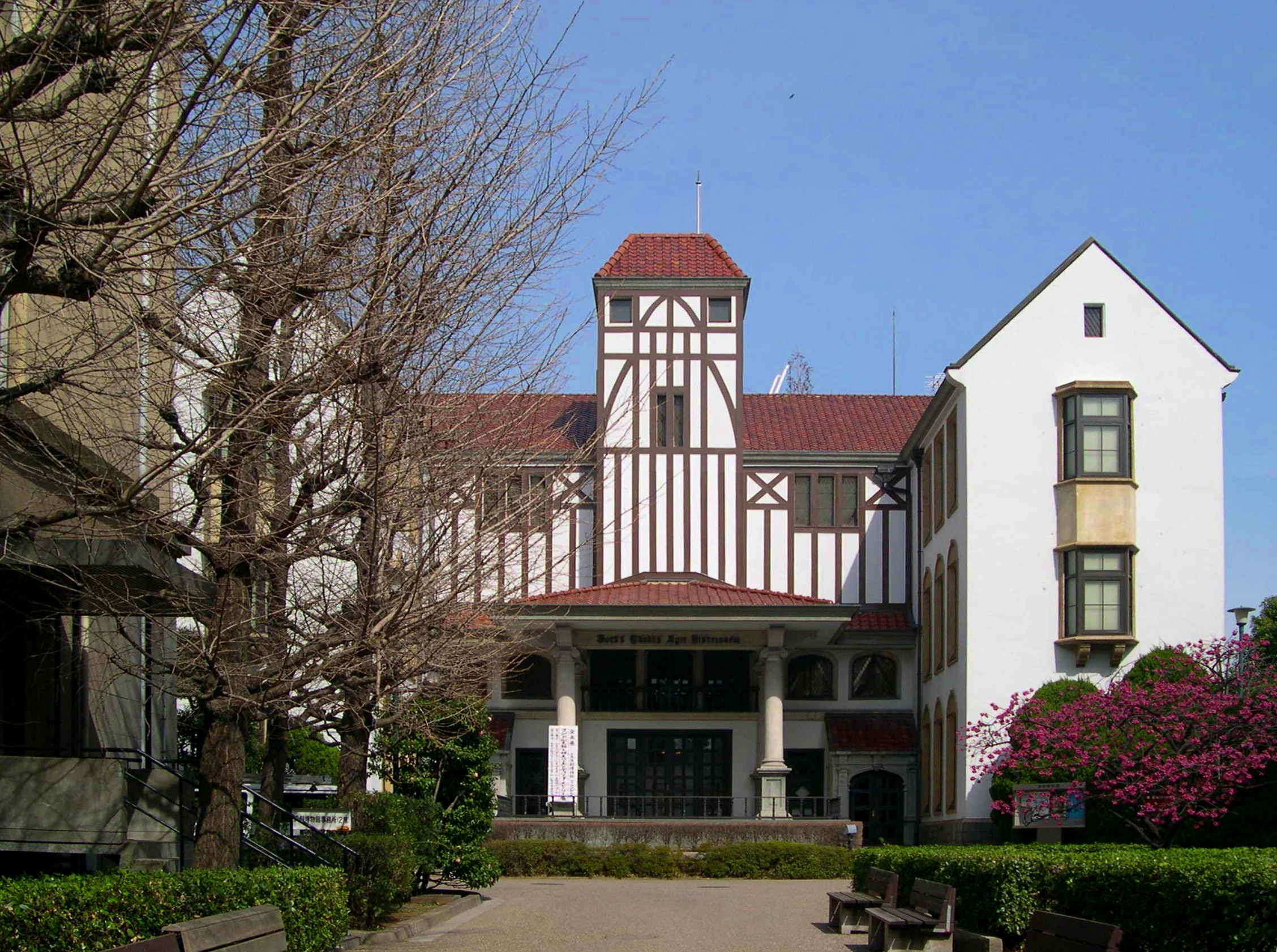
Tsubouchi Memorial Theatre Museum

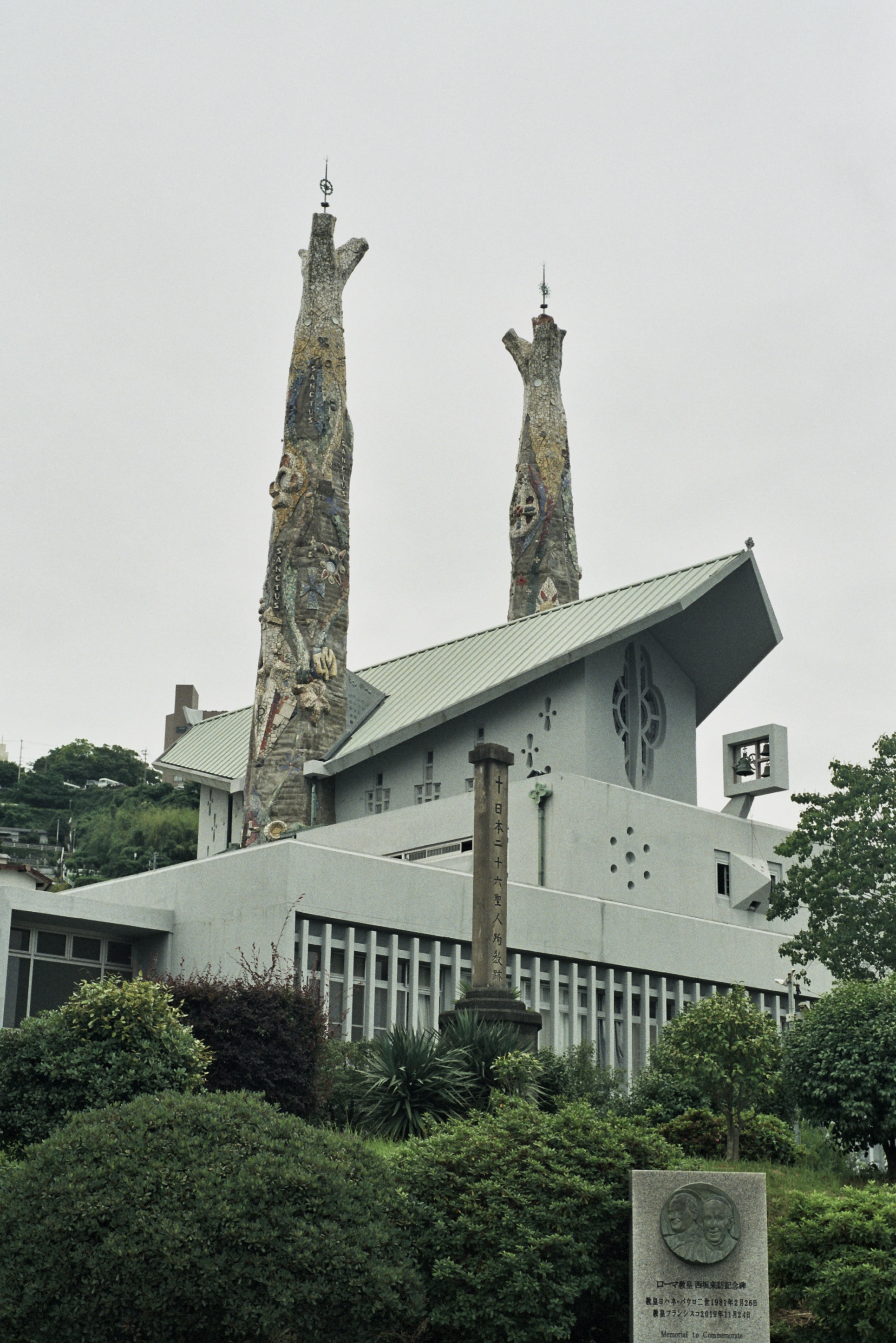
Twenty-Six Martyrs Museum and Monument

- Library at Waseda University (1925)
- Twenty-Six Martyrs Museum and Monument (1962)
- Tokado Imperial Palace (1966)
- Okuma Shigenobu Memorial Museum, Saga City (1967). In honor of Japan's Prime Minister Ōkuma Shigenobu (1838-1922).
