= Fukiage Palace =

- 吹上御所
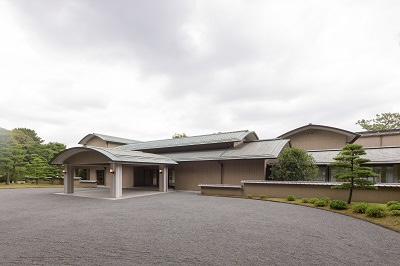
- Carriage porch of Fukiage Palace
- Interactive map of the Fukiage Palace area

General information
- Type: Palace
- Location: Tokyo, Japan
- Coordinates: 35.6843°N 139.7484°E
- Completed: 1993
- Inaugurated: 8 December 1993
- Cost: ¥5.6 billion

Technical details
- Material: Reinforced concrete
- Size: 4,940 m^{2} (53,200 sq ft)
- Floor count: 3

Design and construction
- Architect: Shōzō Uchii
- Known for: Main residence of the Emperor of Japan

Other information
- Number of rooms: 62

The Fukiage Palace (Japanese: 吹上御所, Hepburn: Fukiage Gosho) is the main residence of the Emperor of Japan, located in the Fukiage Garden on the grounds of the Tokyo Imperial Palace.

== Building structure and role ==
Designed by Shōzō Uchii, it was completed in 1993 at a cost of ¥5.6 billion (US$52 million, equivalent to US$116 million in 2025). A reinforced concrete structure, it has an area of roughly 4,940 m^{2} (53,200 sq ft). It consists of sixty-two rooms spread over three floors, including a basement level.

It has three main wings:

- A residential wing of private apartments on the eastern side, consisting of seventeen rooms, for a total floor area of 870 m^{2} (9,400 sq ft).
- A wing of thirty-two office rooms on the northern side.
- A wing dedicated to guest receptions on the southern side, consisting of eleven rooms.

This palace is where the Emperor lives, not to be confused with the main palace (宮殿, Kyūden), where various imperial court functions and receptions take place, and where most dinners with foreign heads of state happen.

== Official name ==
In accordance with the imperial naming conventions, it was renamed Fukiage Sento Palace (吹上仙洞御所, Fukiage Sentō Gosho) when Emperor Akihito abdicated on 30 April 2019. Akihito left the palace on March 31, 2020. His son Naruhito moved in there in September 2021. When the Emperor resides, it is simply referred to as the Imperial Palace (御所, Gosho).
