= Shōzō Uchii =

Japanese architect (1933–2002)

- Born: 20 February 1933; Kanda, Tokyo City, Japan
- Died: 3 August 2002 (aged 69); Tokyo, Japan
- Education: Waseda University; Kyoto University
- Occupation: Architect
- Practice: Shōzō Uchii Architect and Associates
- Buildings: Setagaya Art Museum
- Website: www.uchii.co.jp/html/home_info.html

Shōzō Uchii (内井 昭蔵, Uchii Shōzō) was a Japanese architect and academic authority on the works of Frank Lloyd Wright. Known for the design of landmark structures such as the Setagaya Art Museum, Oita City Museum of Art, and the Fukiage Palace, the residence on the grounds of the Tokyo Imperial Palace for the Emperor of Japan.

Uchii was awarded the R.S Reynolds Memorial Prize in 1980 for his design of the Treasury building of the Kuon-ji Temple in Minobu, Yamanashi Prefecture.

== Early life, education and career ==
Uchii was born in Tokyo on the 20 February 1933. After graduating with both an undergraduate and master's degree from Waseda University in 1958, he started his architectural career in the offices of influential Metabolist pioneer Kiyonori Kikutake. Uchii started his own independent architectural practice, Shōzō Uchii Architect and Associates, in 1967.

Uchii earned a PhD degree in engineering from Kyoto University in 1992.

From 1979 to 1981, Uchii served as President of the Japan Institute of Architects.

=== List of works ===
- Treasury building of the Kuon-ji Temple, Minobu, Yamanashi Prefecture (1976)
- Tokyo YMCA Nobeyama Youth Center, Minamimaki, Nagano Prefecture (1976)
- St. Hilda's School, Shinagawa, Tokyo, main classroom building and auditorium (1978)
- Setagaya Art Museum, Setagaya, Tokyo (1986)
- Urasoe Art Museum, Urasoe, Okinawa Prefecture (1990)
- Fukiage palace inside the Tokyo Imperial Palace, the Residence of the Imperial Family (1993)
- Nippon Sei Ko Kai, Nazareth Convent and retreat center, Mitaka, Tokyo (1993)
- Sunritz Hattori Museum of Arts, Suwa, Nagano Prefecture (1995)
- Kanazawa Karakuri Memorial Museum (1996)
- The University of Shiga Prefecture, master plan and main campus structures (1997)
- Motoazabu Hills, Forest Tower, Minato, Tokyo (2002)

=== Gallery ===
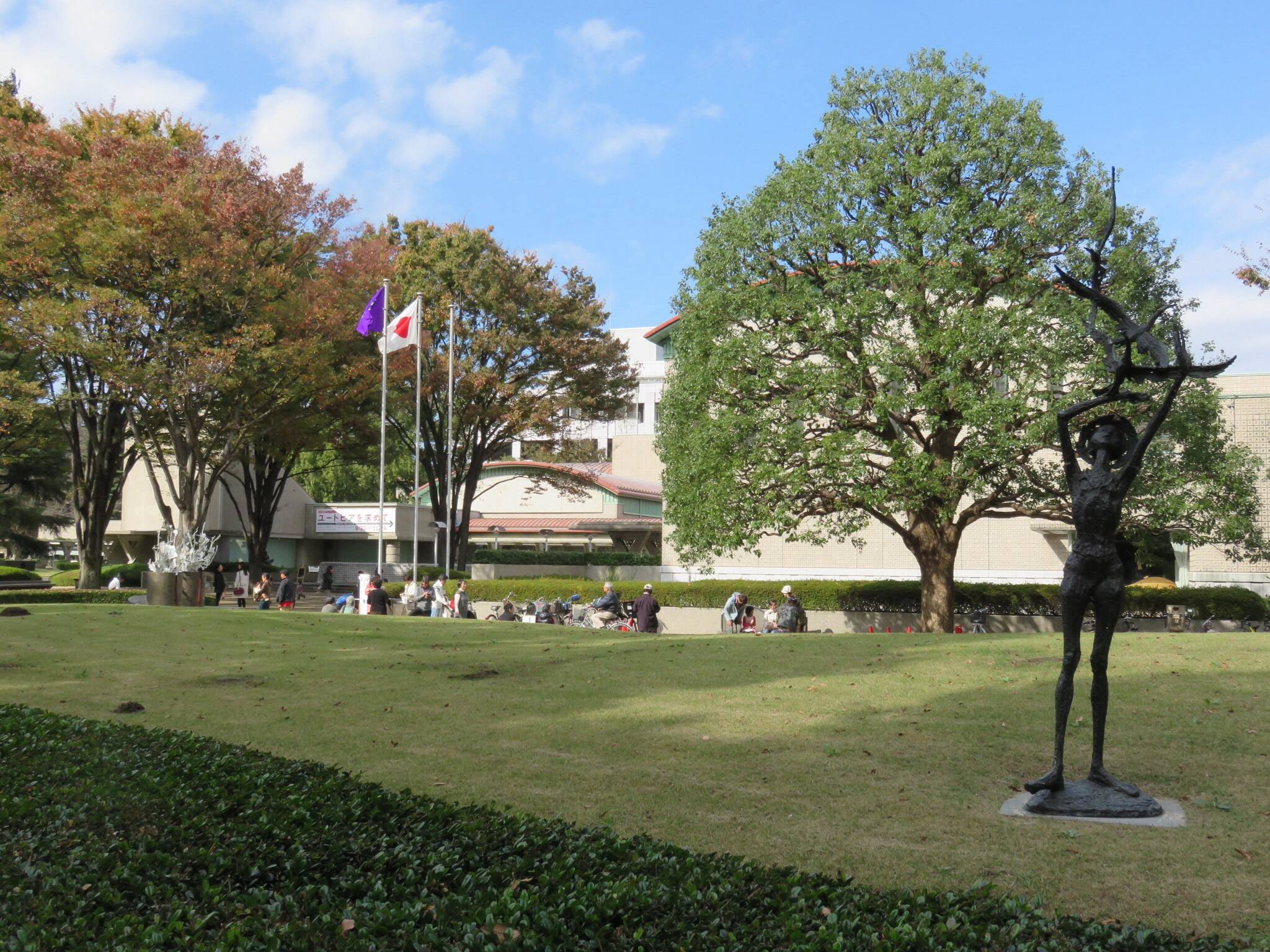
Setagaya Art Museum

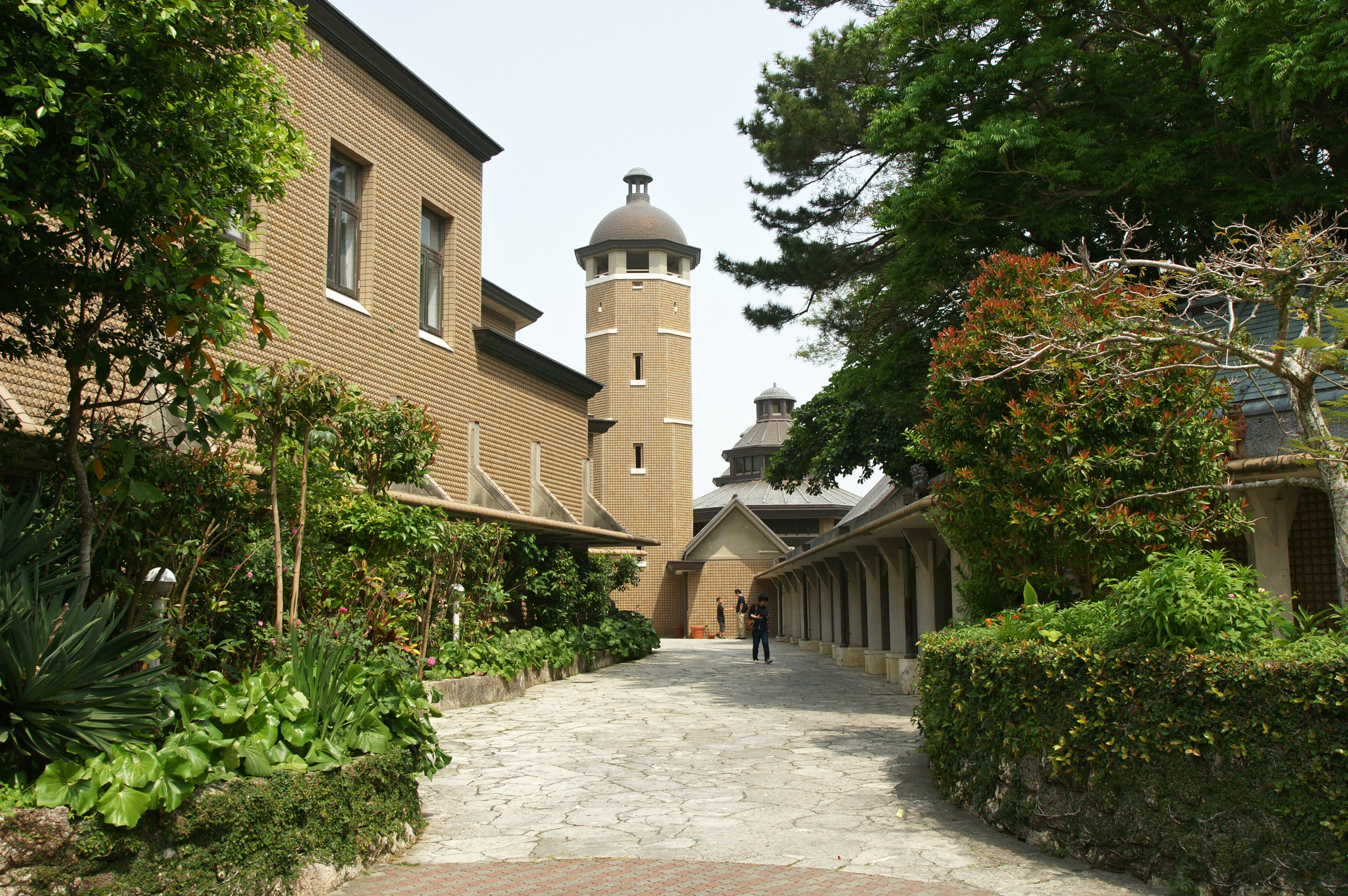
Urasoe Art Museum

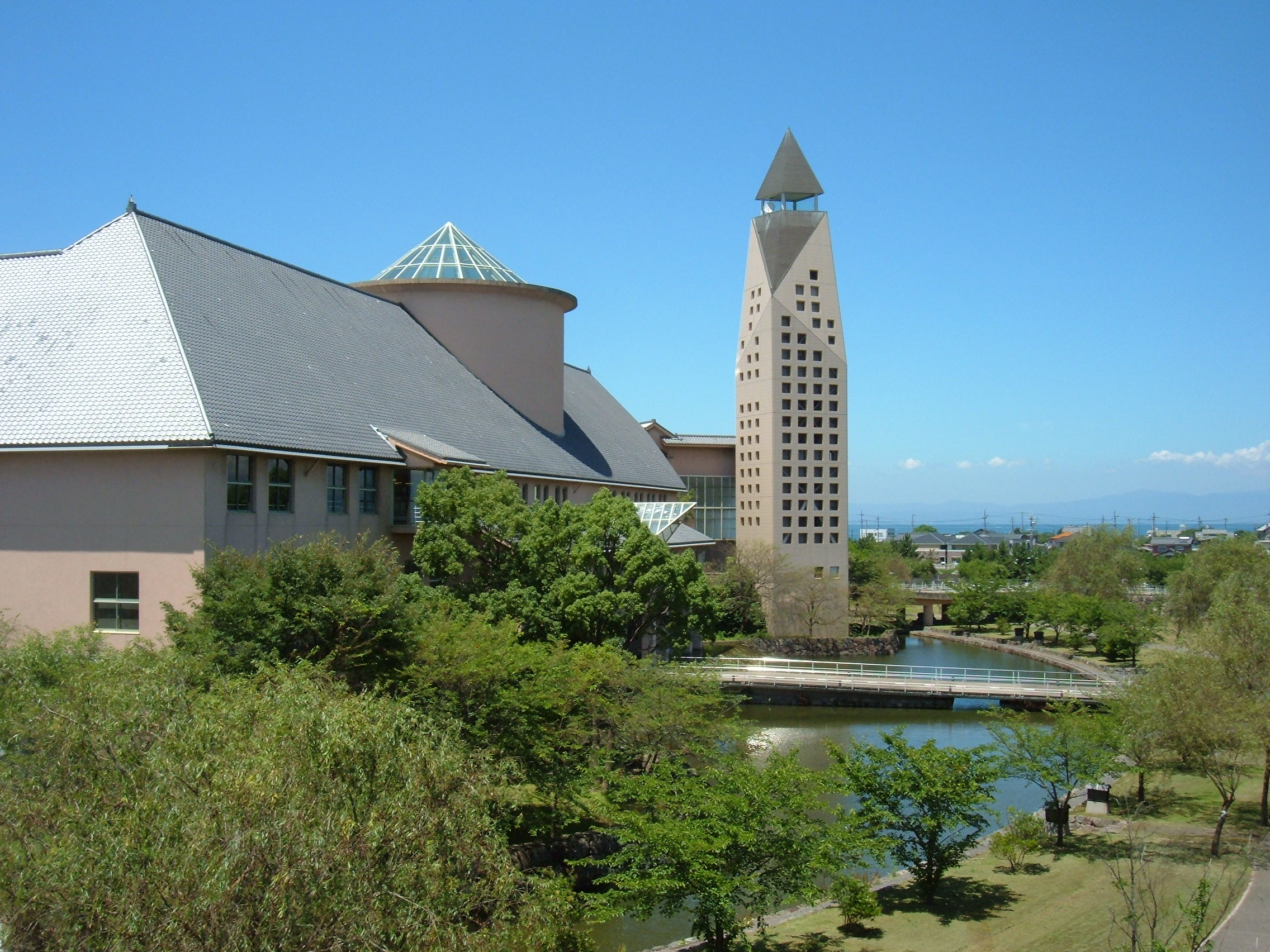
The University of Shiga Prefecture

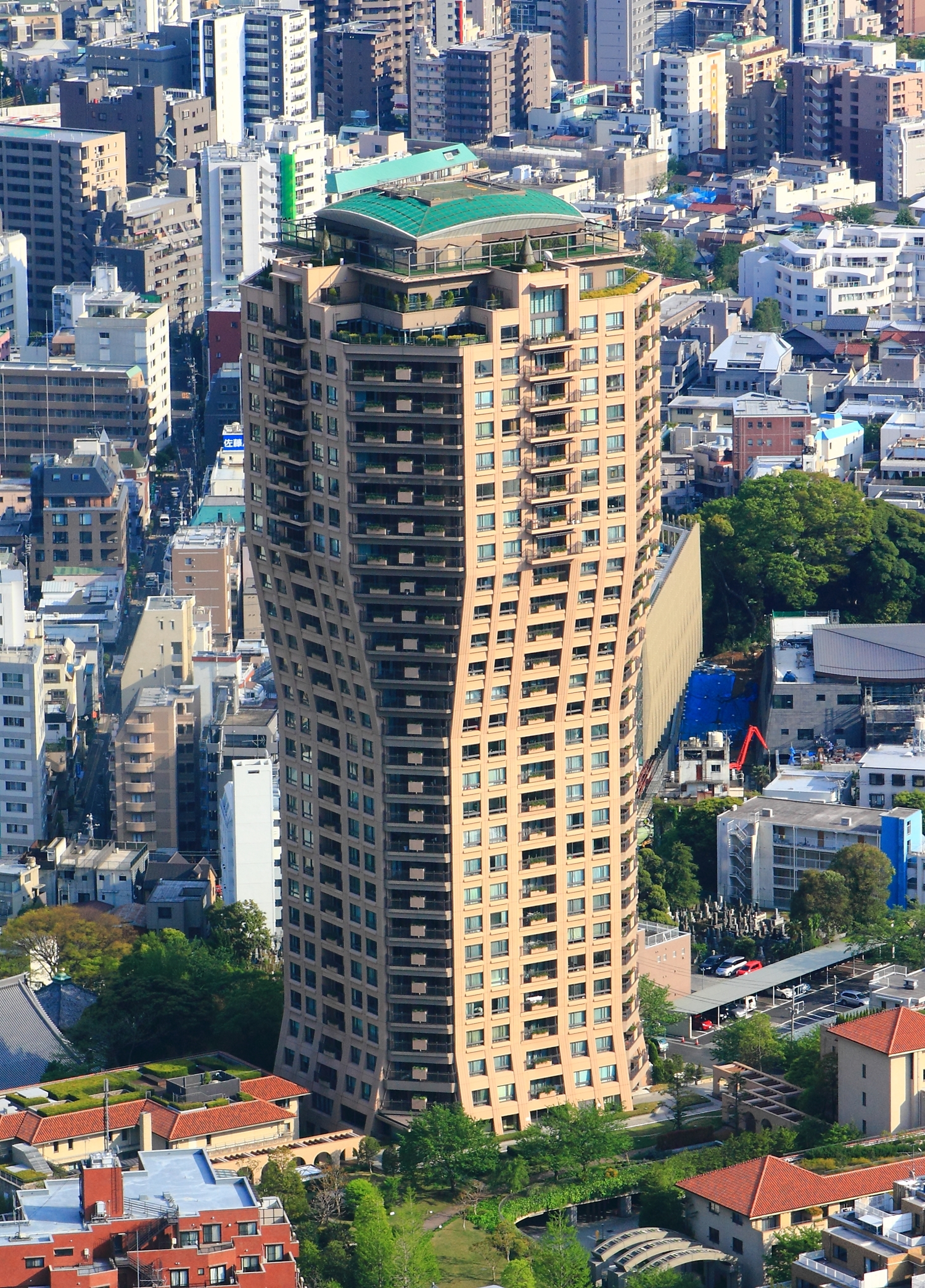
Motoazabu Hills, Forest Tower

=== Honors and recognition ===
Uchii's awards and honors include:

- 1980 – R.S. Reynolds Memorial Award for Kuonji Temple Treasury, Minobu, Yamanashi
- 1986 – Mainichi Art Prize
