= Tokyo Imperial Palace =

Main residence of the Emperor of Japan

Imperial Palace
- 皇居
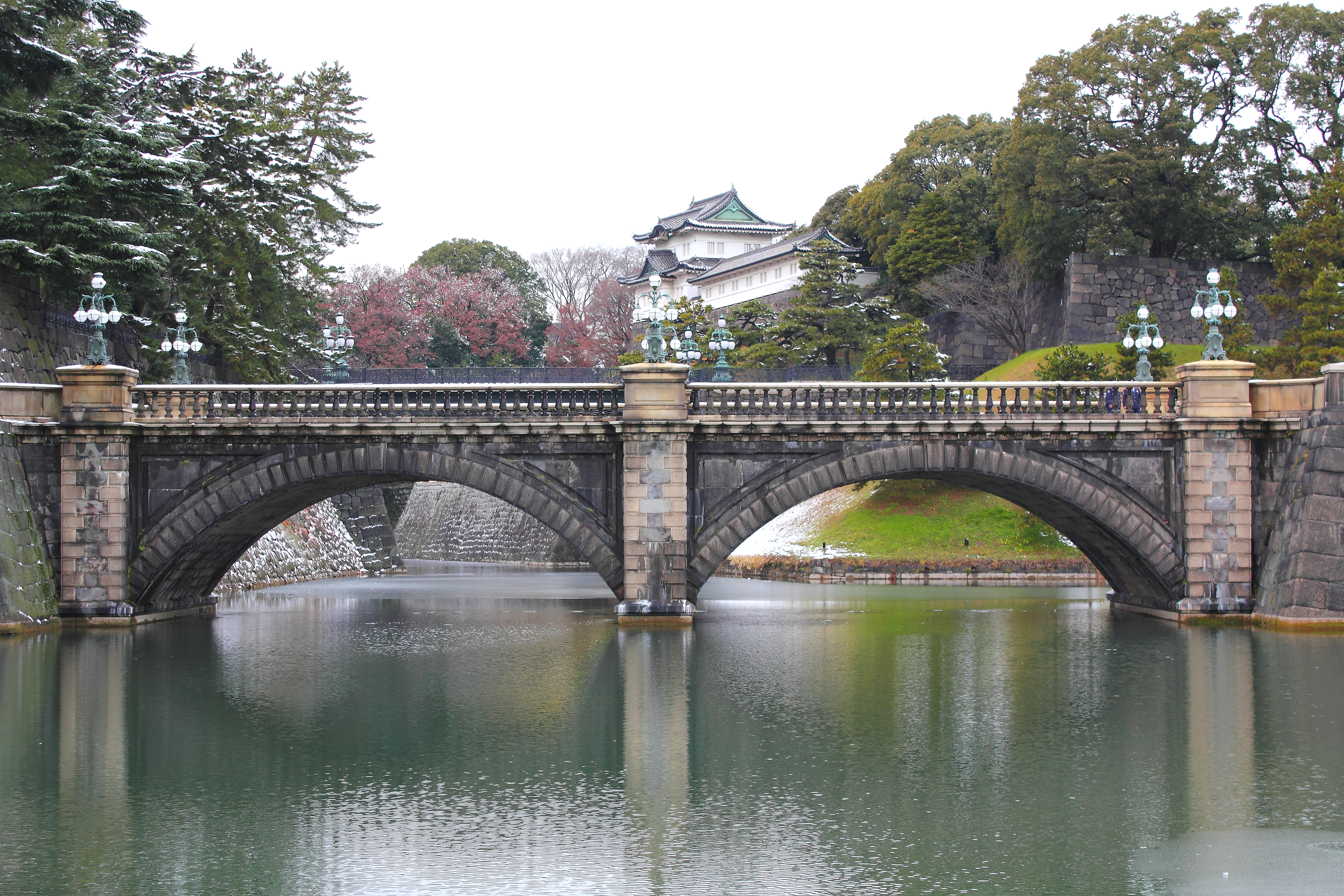
- Seimon Ishibashi bridge, which leads to the main gate of the Imperial Palace
- Former names: Edo Castle

General information
- Classification: Imperial Palace, the Imperial Household Agency, Three Palace Sanctuaries such as the imperial family housing area of related facilities
- Location: 1-1 Chiyoda, Chiyoda-ku 100-0001 Tokyo, Tokyo, Japan
- Coordinates: 35.6824°N 139.7527°E

Technical details
- Grounds: Circa 1.15 km^{2} (0.44 mi^{2}) (Imperial Household Agency management part); Circa 2.30 km^{2} (0.89 mi^{2}) (total area, including Kokyo Gaien National Garden)

The Imperial Palace (皇居, Kōkyo; lit. 'Imperial Residence') is the main residence of the emperor of Japan. It is a large park-like area located in the Chiyoda district of the Chiyoda ward of Tokyo and contains several buildings, including the Fukiage Palace (吹上御所, Fukiage gosho), where the emperor has his living quarters; the main palace (宮殿, Kyūden), where various ceremonies and receptions take place; some residences of the Imperial Family; an archive; and museums and administrative offices.

The 1.15-square-kilometer (0.44 sq mi) palace grounds and gardens are built on the site of the old Edo Castle (江戸城, Edo-jō).

== History ==
=== Edo castle ===
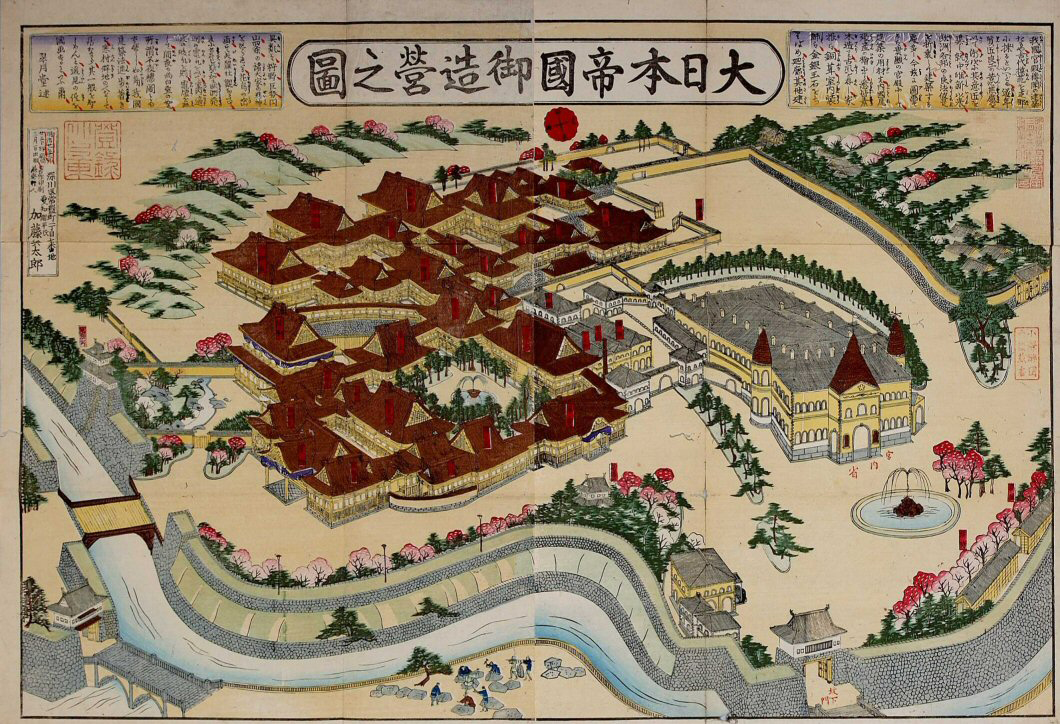
The Kyūden shortly after its completion in the late 1800s

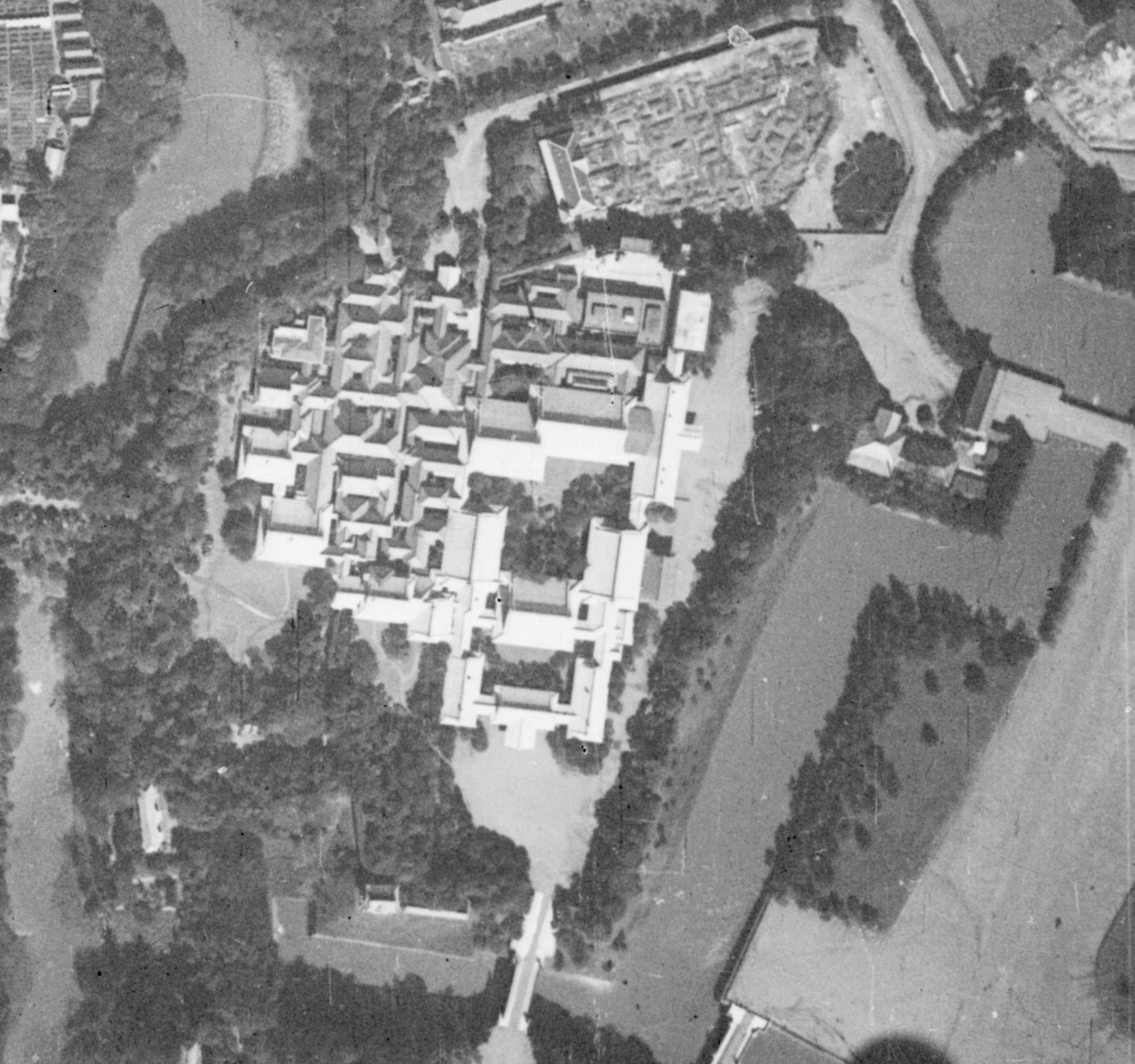
Aerial photo of the Kyūden around 1935

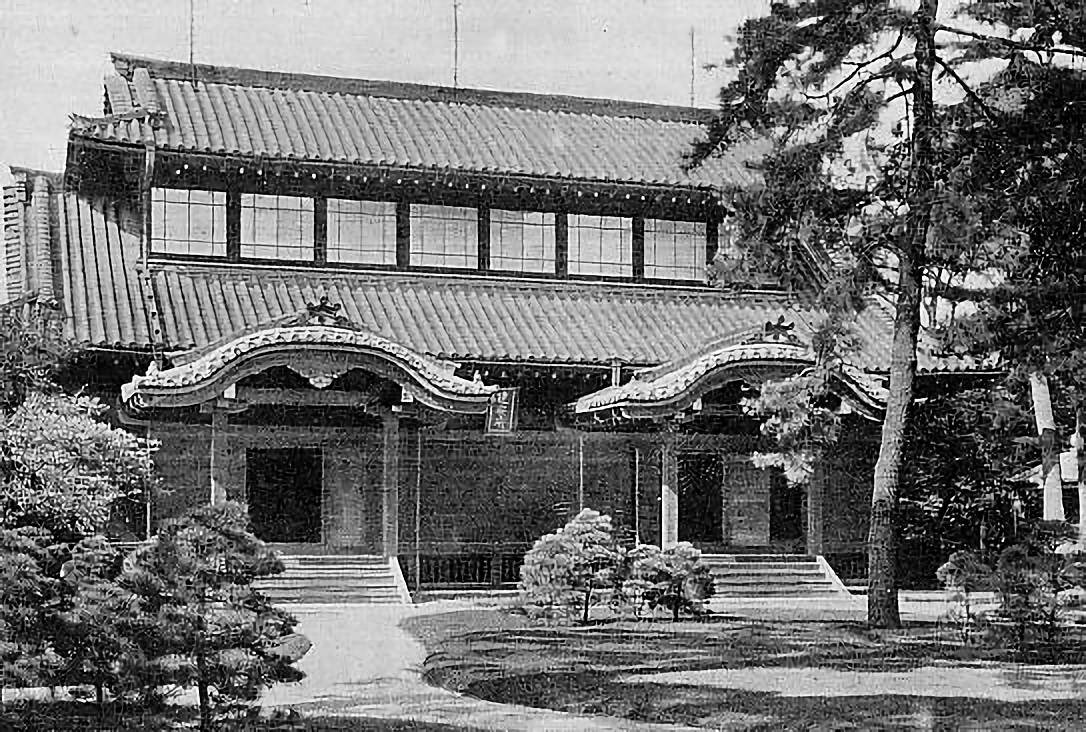
Kenanfu, Tokyo Imperial Palace

The Tokyo Imperial Palace was home to a 2000-year-long line of emperors and empresses. It was also maintained and used by members of the Tokugawa shogunate. Later, Emperor Meiji moved into the palace in 1869.

A non-profit "Rebuilding Edo-jo Association" (NPO法人 江戸城再建) was founded in 2004 with the aim of a historically correct reconstruction of at least the main donjon. In March 2013, Naotaka Kotake, head of the group, said that "the capital city needs a symbolic building", and that the group planned to collect donations and signatures on a petition in support of rebuilding the tower. A reconstruction blueprint had been made based on old documents. The Imperial Household Agency at the time has not indicated whether it would support the project.

=== The old palace ===
In the Meiji period, most structures from the Edo Castle disappeared. Some were cleared to make way for other buildings, while others were destroyed by earthquakes and fire. For example, the wooden double bridges (二重橋, Nijūbashi) over the moat were replaced with stone and iron bridges. The buildings of the Imperial Palace constructed in the Meiji era were constructed of wood. Their design employed traditional Japanese architecture in their exterior appearance while the interiors were an eclectic mixture of fashionable Japanese and European elements. The ceilings of the grand chambers were coffered with Japanese elements; however, Western chairs, tables and heavy curtains furnished the spaces. The floors of the public rooms had parquets or carpets, while the residential spaces used traditional tatami mats.

The main audience hall was the central part of the palace. It was the largest building in the compound. Guests were received there for public events. The floor space was more than 223 tsubo or approximately 737.25 m^{2} (7,935.7 sq ft). In the interior, the coffered ceiling was traditional Japanese-style, while the floor was parquetry. The roof was styled similarly to the Kyoto Imperial Palace, but was covered with (fireproof) copper plates rather than Japanese cypress shingles.

In the late Taishō and early Shōwa period, more concrete buildings were added, such as the headquarters of the Imperial Household Ministry and the Privy Council. These structures exhibited only token Japanese elements.

From 1888 to 1948, the compound was called Palace Castle (宮城, Kyūjō). On the night of May 25, 1945, most structures of the Imperial Palace were destroyed in the Allied firebombing raid on Tokyo. According to the US bomber pilot Richard Lineberger, the Emperor's Palace was the target of their special mission on July 29, 1945, and was hit with 2000-pound bombs. In August 1945, in the closing days of the Pacific War, Emperor Hirohito met with his Privy Council and made decisions culminating in the surrender of Japan at an underground air-raid shelter on the palace grounds referred to as His Majesty's Library (御文庫附属室, Obunko Fuzokushitsu).

Due to the large-scale destruction of the Meiji-era palace, a new main palace hall (宮殿, Kyūden) and residences were constructed on the western portion of the site in 1964–1968, designed by architect Junzō Yoshimura. The area was renamed Imperial Residence (皇居, Kōkyo) in 1948, while the eastern part was renamed East Garden (東御苑, Higashi-Gyoen) and became a public park in 1968.

Interior images of the Meiji-era palace

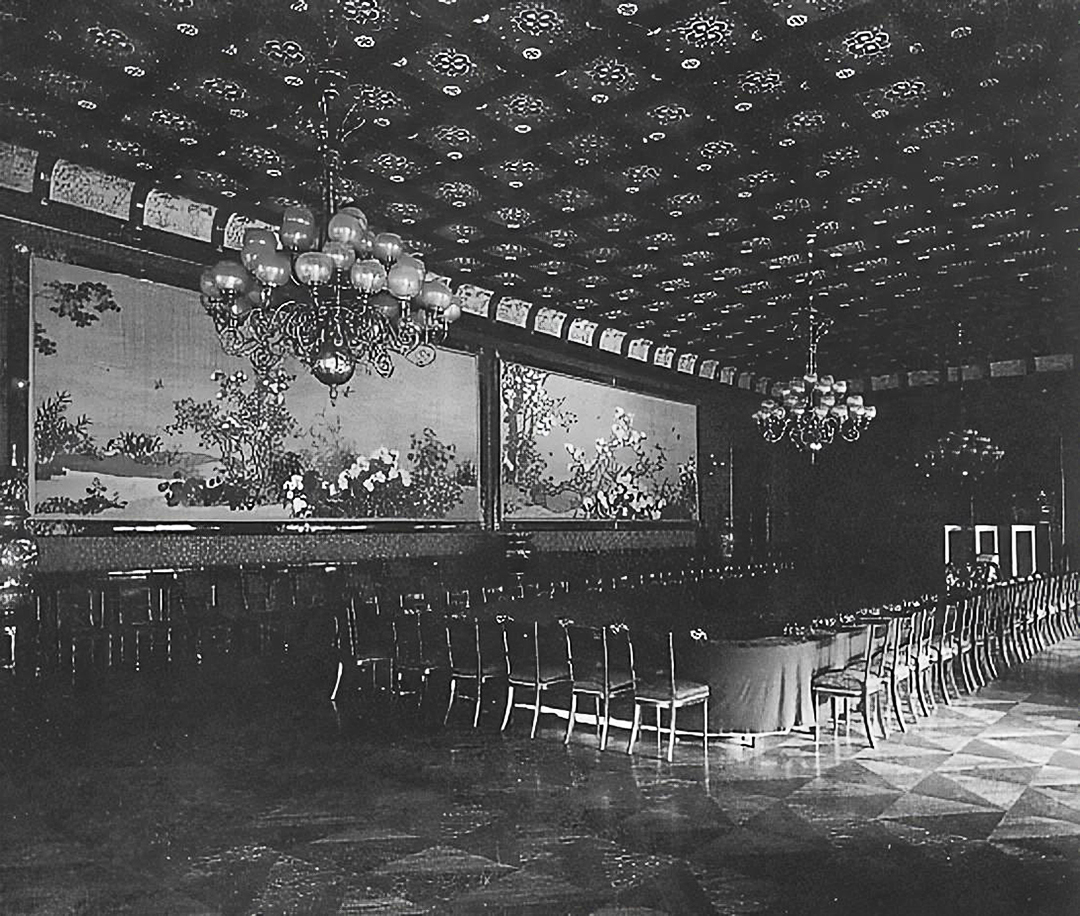
Higashidamari-no-Ma

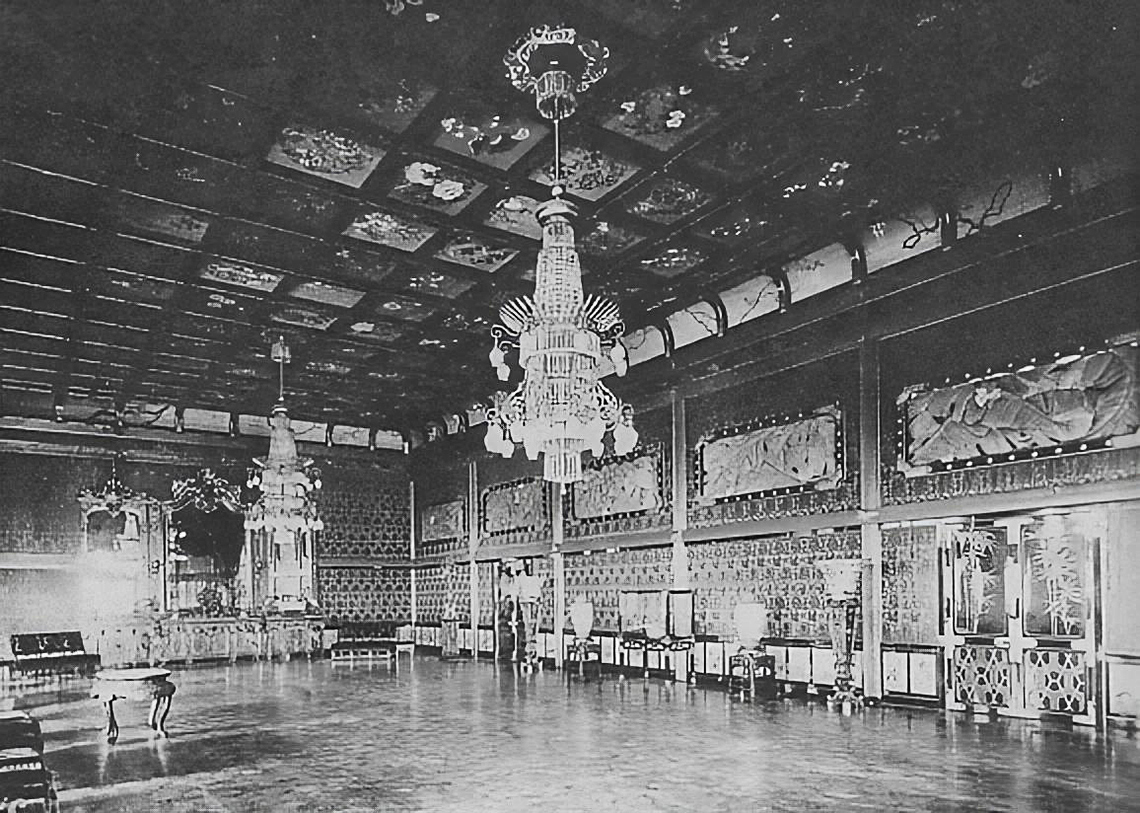
Chigusa-no-Ma

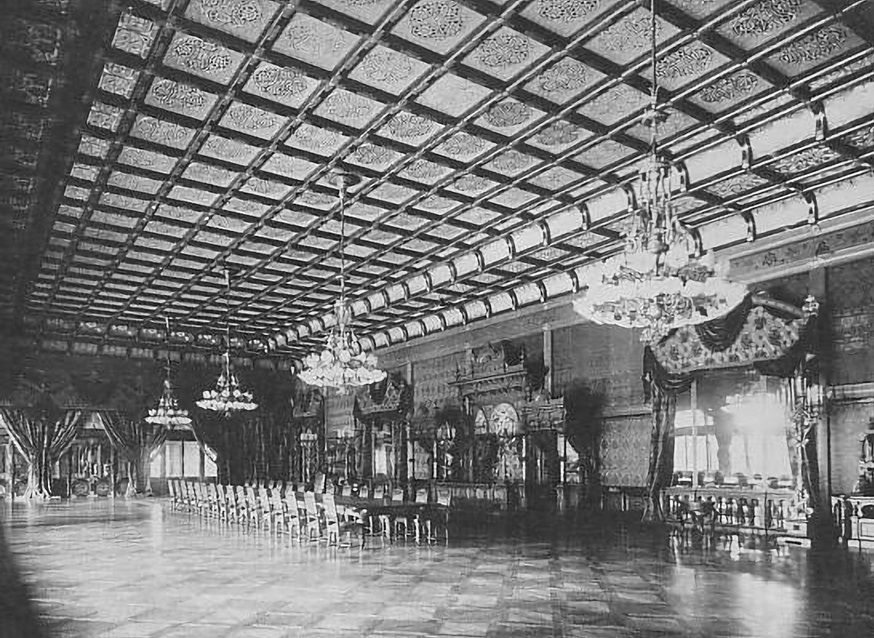
Hōmei-Den

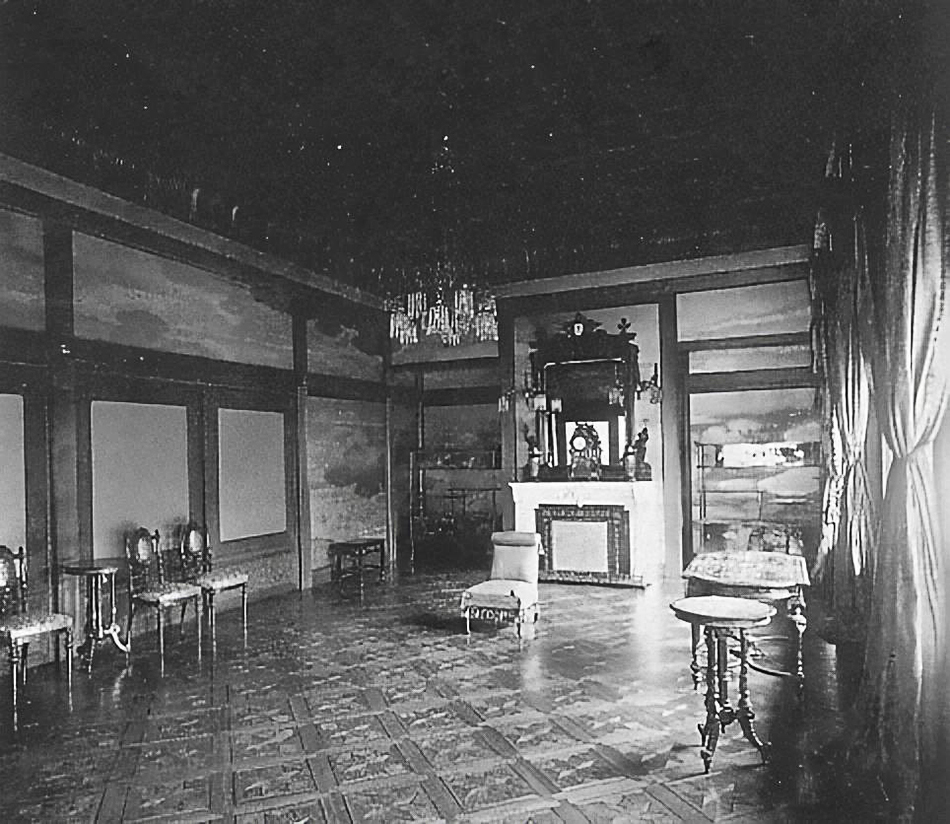
Kiri-no-Ma

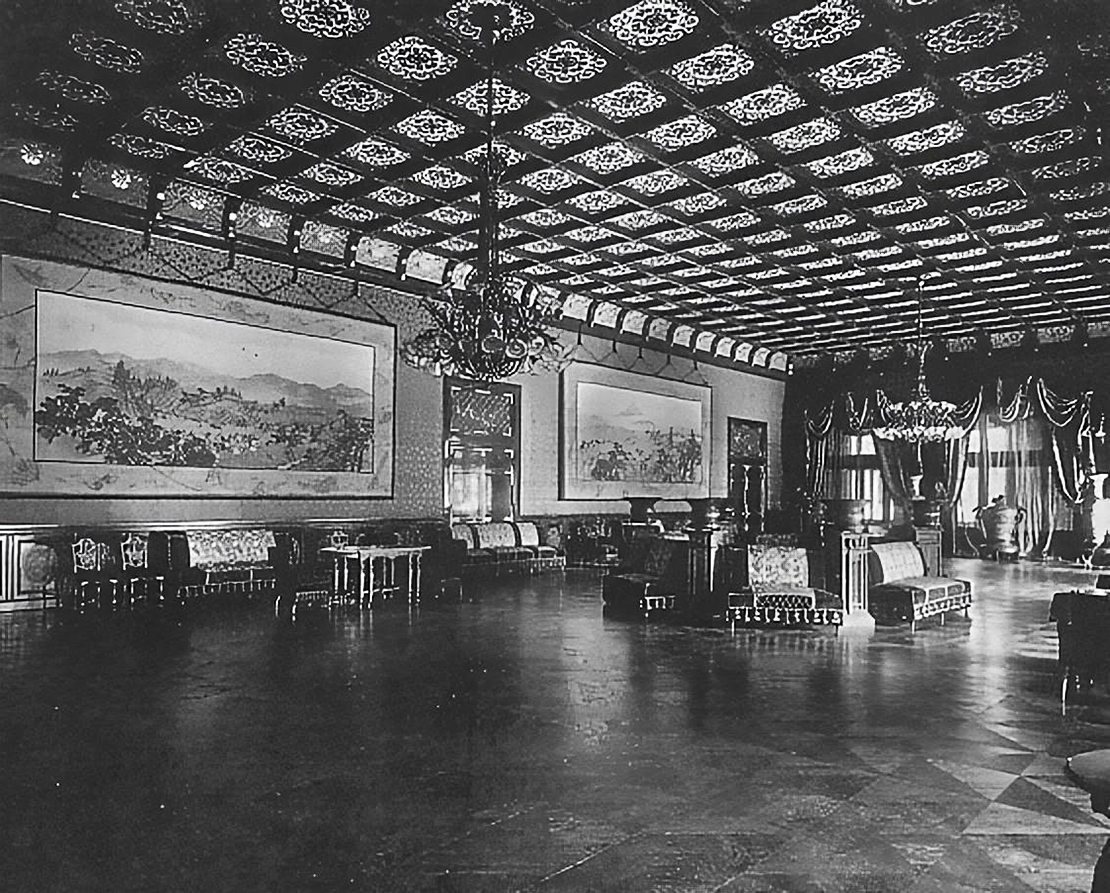
Nishidamari-no-Ma

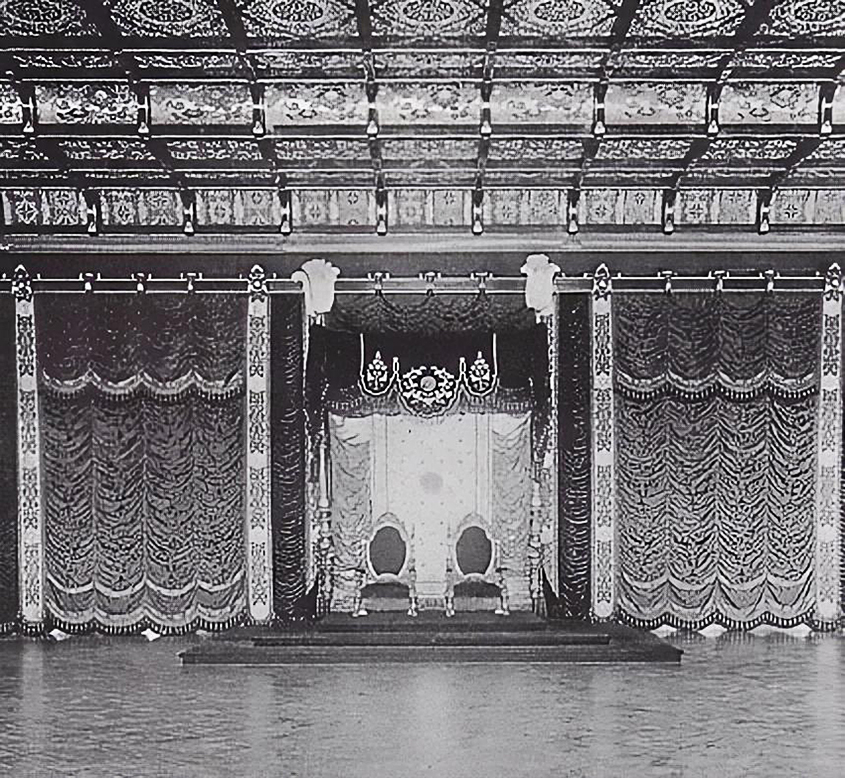
Throne hall

=== Present palace ===
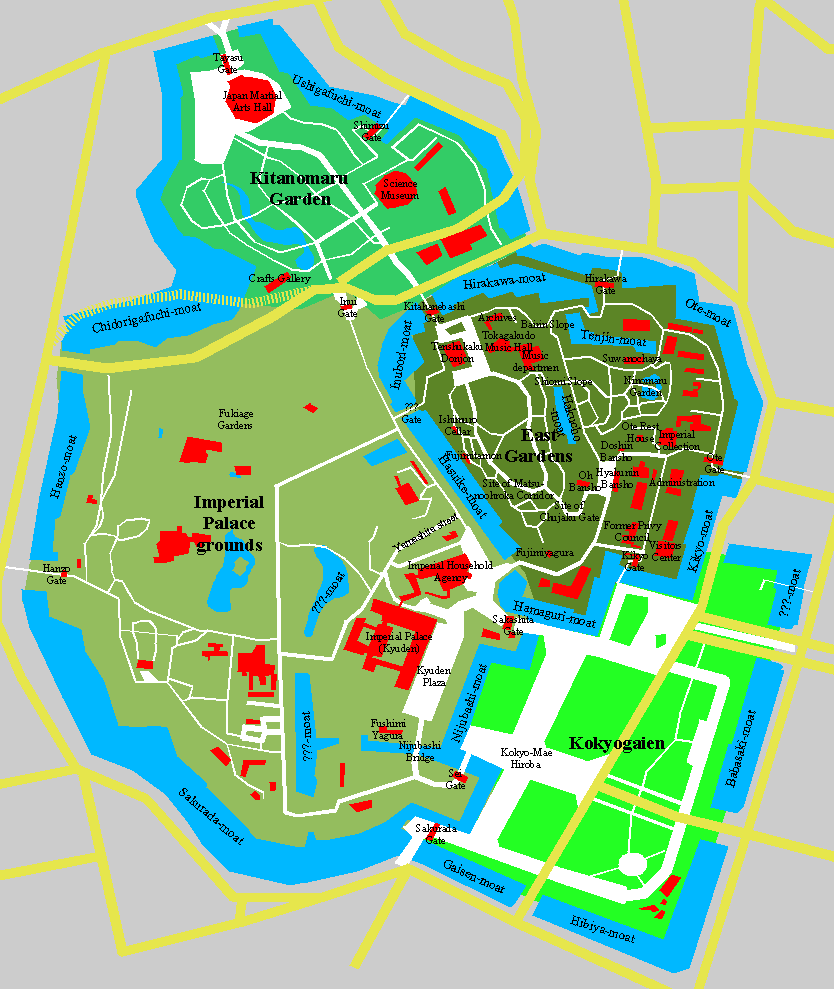
Map of the Imperial Palace and surrounding gardens

The present Imperial Palace encompasses the retrenchments of the former Edo Castle. The modern Kyūden (宮殿) designed for various imperial court functions and receptions is located in the old Nishinomaru section of the palace grounds. The kyūden was completed in 1968 and put into use in April 1969. It was built with the traditional Japanese architectural beauty of a large roof and columns and beams, and most of its building materials are of domestic origin. It has a total area of 24,175 square meters and consists of seven wings. On a much more modest scale, the Fukiage Palace (吹上御所, Fukiage gosho), the official residence of the Emperor and empress, is located in the Fukiage Garden. Designed by Japanese architect Shōzō Uchii the modern residence was completed in 1993. The residence is currently in use by Emperor Naruhito.

Except for the Imperial Household Agency and the East Gardens, the main grounds of the palace are generally closed to the public, except for reserved guided tours from Tuesdays to Saturdays (which access only the Kyūden Totei Plaza in front of the Chowaden). Each New Year (January 2) and Emperor's Birthday (February 23), the public is permitted to enter through the Nakamon (inner gate) where they gather in the Kyūden Totei Plaza. The Imperial Family appears on the balcony before the crowd and the Emperor normally gives a short speech greeting and thanking the visitors and wishing them good health and blessings. Parts of the Fukiage garden are sometimes open to the general public.

The old Honmaru, Ninomaru, and Sannomaru compounds now comprise the East Gardens, an area with public access containing administrative and other public buildings.

The Kitanomaru Park is located to the north and is the former northern enceinte of Edo Castle. It is a public park and is the site of the Nippon Budokan. To the south is Kokyo Gaien National Garden.

Though much of the site is off limits to the public, there have been multiple instances of tourists attempting to trespass on the palace grounds by swimming in the moat. In 2008, a British tourist stripped naked, repeatedly dove into and swam across the moat in an attempt to avoid being arrested, and used stones and a plastic pole as weapons when faced by staff and local police officers. A similar incident took place in 2013, in which two drunken tourists decided to try to sneak into the palace building after removing their clothing and entering the water near Sakurada Gate.

== Grounds ==
=== Kyūden ===
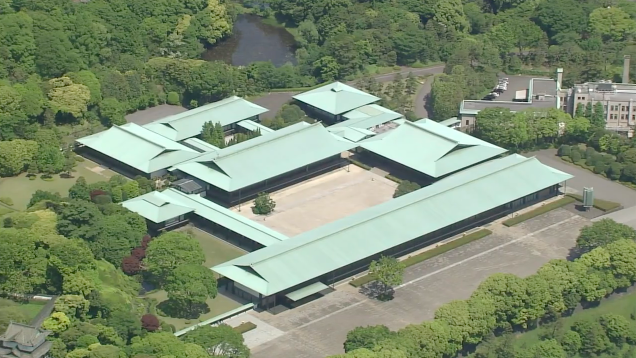
Aerial image of the Kyūden

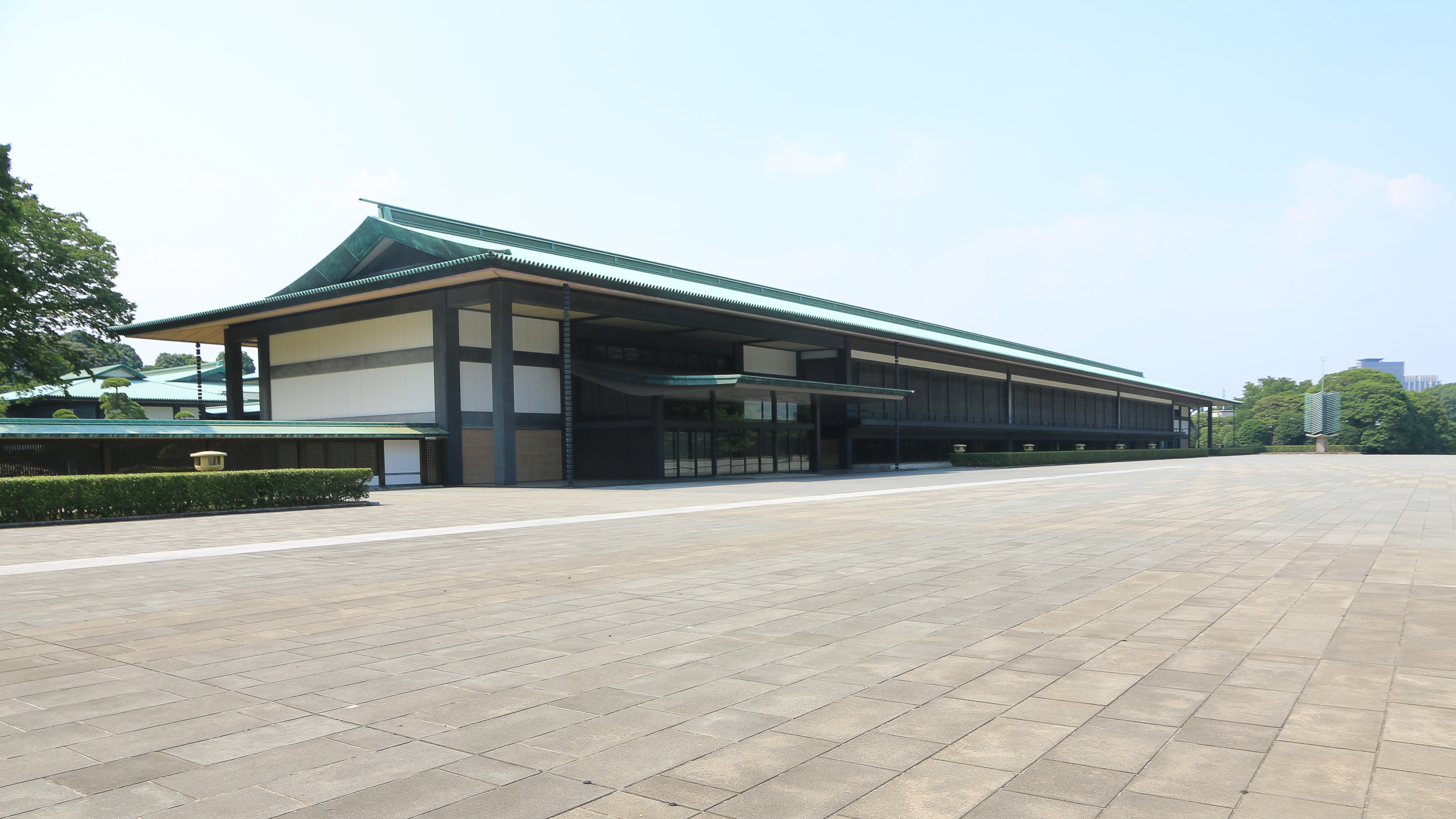
Chōwaden Reception Hall, the largest structure of the palace

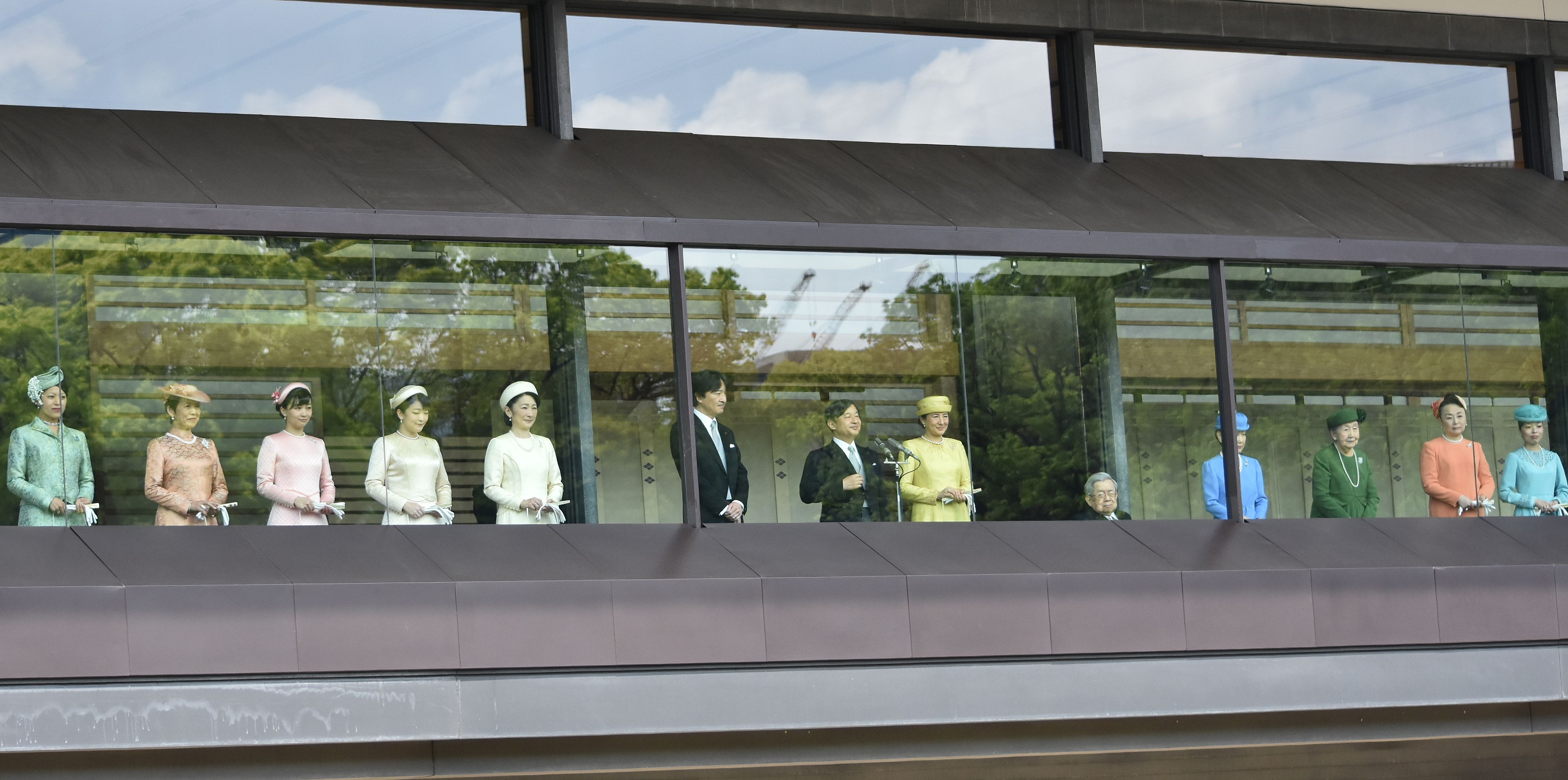
Emperor Naruhito greets the public at the Chōwaden Reception Hall following his accession in 2019.

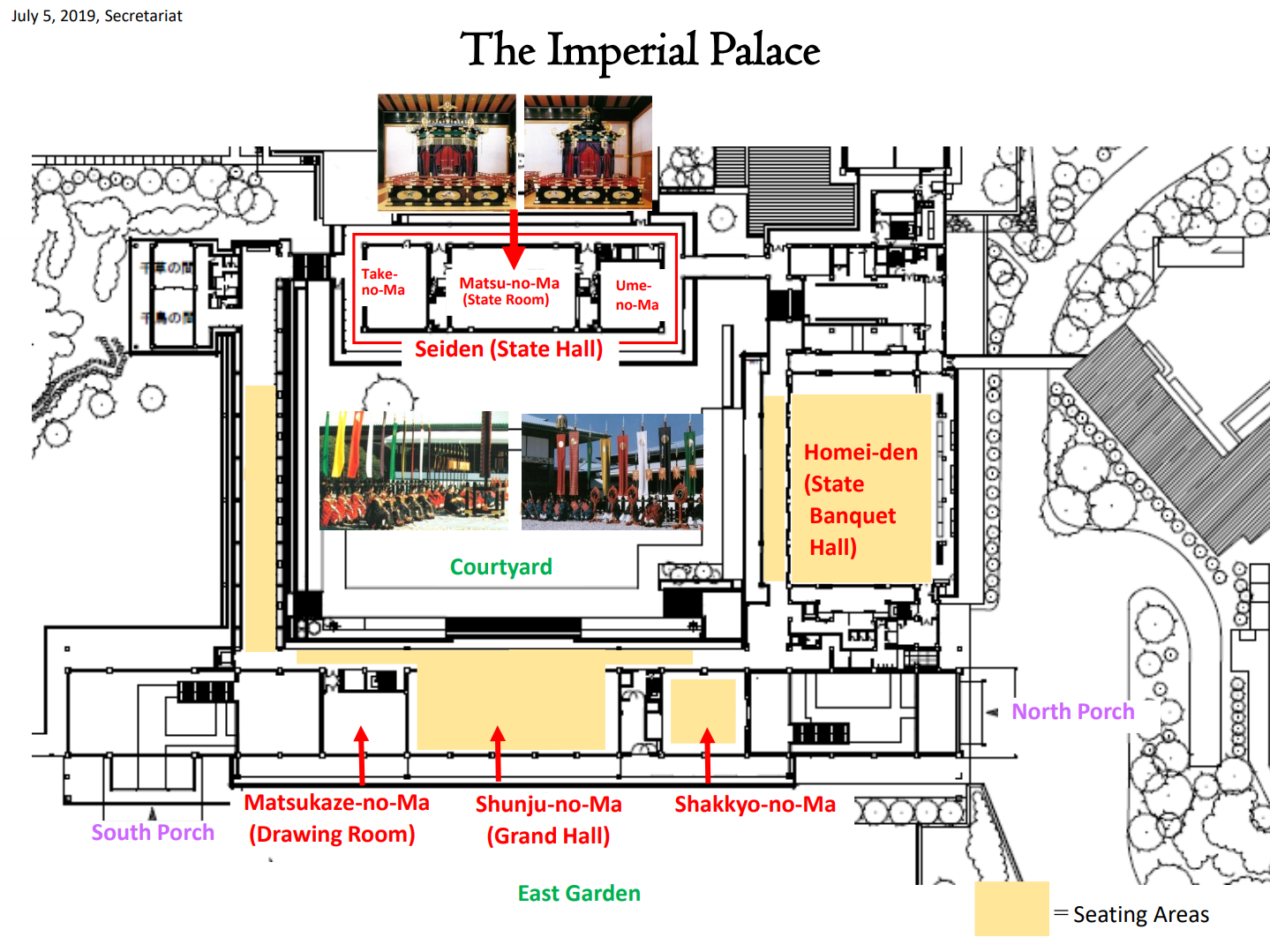
Map of the Kyūden

The Imperial Palace (宮殿, Kyūden) and the headquarters of the Imperial Household Agency are located in the former Nishinomaru enceinte (West Citadel) of the Edo Castle.

The main buildings of the palace grounds, including the Kyūden (宮殿) main palace, home of the liaison conference of the Imperial General Headquarters, were severely damaged by the fire of May 1945. Today's palace consists of multiple modern structures that are interconnected. The palace complex was finished in 1968 and was constructed of steel-framed reinforced concrete structures produced domestically, with two stories above ground and one story below. The buildings of the Imperial Palace were constructed by the Takenaka Corporation in a modernist style with clear Japanese architectural references such as the large, gabled hipped roof, columns and beams.

The complex consists of six wings, including:

- Seiden State Function Hall
- Hōmeiden State Banquet Hall
- Chōwaden Reception Hall
- Rensui Dining Room
- Chigusa Chidori Drawing Room and
- The Emperor's work office

Halls include the Minami-Damari, Nami-no-Ma, multiple corridors, Kita-Damari, Shakkyō-no-Ma, Shunju-no-Ma, Seiden-Sugitoe (Kaede), Seiden-Sugitoe (Sakura), Take-no-Ma, Ume-no-Ma and Matsu-no-Ma. Famous Nihonga artists such as Maeda Seison were commissioned to paint the artworks.

The Kyūden is used for both receiving state guests and holding official state ceremonies and functions. The Matsu-no-Ma (Pine Chamber) is the throne room. The Emperor gives audiences to the Prime Minister in this room, as well as appointing or dismissing ambassadors and Ministers of State. It is also the room where the Prime Minister and Chief Justice are appointed to office.

=== Fukiage Garden ===
The Fukiage Garden has carried the name since the Edo period and is used as the residential area for the Imperial Family.

The Fukiage Palace (吹上御所, Fukiage gosho), completed in 1993, was used as the primary residence of Akihito from December 8, 1993, to March 2020. After a period of refurbishment, Naruhito, Masako and Aiko moved in during September 2021.

The Fukiage Ōmiya Palace (吹上大宮御所, Fukiage Ōmiya-gosho) in the northern section was originally the residence of Emperor Showa and Empress Kōjun and was called the Fukiage Palace. After the Emperor's death in 1989, the palace was renamed the Fukiage Ōmiya Palace and was the residence of the Empress Dowager until her death in 2000. It is currently not in use.

The palace precincts include the Three Palace Sanctuaries (宮中三殿, Kyūchū-sanden). Parts of the Imperial Regalia of Japan are kept here and the sanctuary plays a religious role in imperial enthronements and weddings.

== East Gardens ==
The East Gardens are where most of the administrative buildings for the palace are located and encompass the former Honmaru and Ninomaru areas of Edo Castle, a total of 210,000 m^{2} (2,300,000 sq ft). Located on the grounds of the East Gardens is the Imperial Tokagakudo Music Hall, the Music Department of the Board of Ceremonies of the Imperial Household, the Archives and Mausolea Department Imperial Household Agency, structures for the guards such as the Saineikan dojo, and the Museum of the Imperial Collections.

Several structures that were added since the Meiji period were removed over time to allow construction of the East Garden. In 1932, the kuretake-ryō was built as a dormitory for imperial princesses, however this building was removed prior to the construction of the present gardens. Other buildings such as stables and housing were removed to create the East Garden in its present configuration.

Construction work began in 1961 with a new pond in the Ninomaru, as well as the repair and restoration of various keeps and structures from the Edo period. On May 30, 1963, the area was declared by the Japanese government a "Special Historic Relic" under the Cultural Properties Protection Law.

=== Tōkagakudō (Music Hall) ===
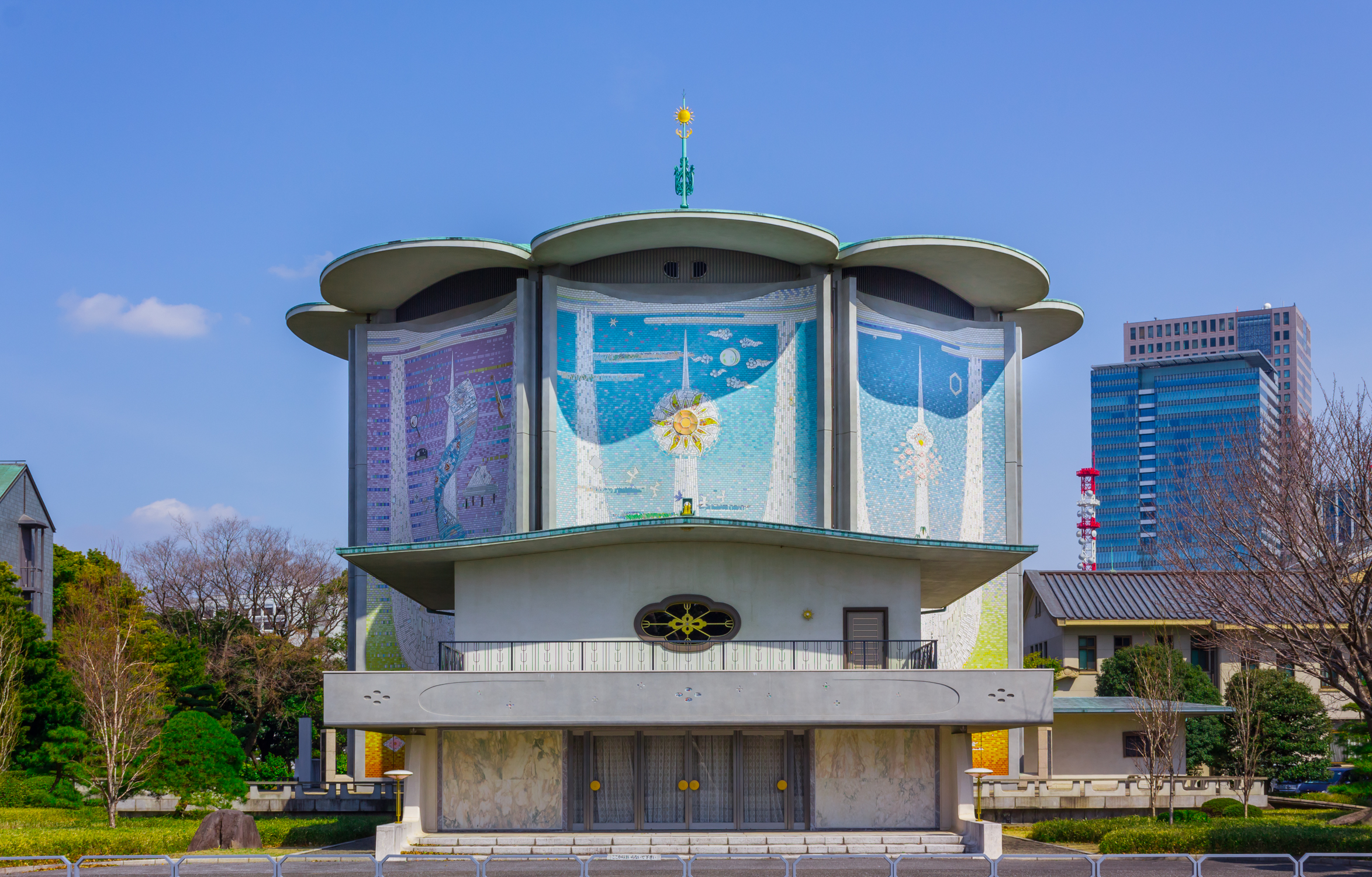
Tōkagakudō (Music Hall)

The Tōkagakudō (桃華楽堂; Peach Blossom Music Hall) is located to the east of the former main donjon of Edo Castle in the Honmaru. Designed by Kenji Imai, this music hall was built in commemoration of the 60th birthday of Empress Kōjun on March 6, 1963. The ferro-concrete building covers a total area of 1,254 m^{2} (13,500 sq ft). The hall is octagon-shaped and each of its eight outer walls is decorated with differently designed mosaic tiles. Construction began in August 1964 and was completed in February 1966.

=== Ninomaru Garden ===
Symbolic trees representing each prefecture in Japan are planted in the northwestern corner of Ninomaru enceinte. Such trees have been donated from each prefecture and there are total of 260, covering 30 varieties.

The small Ninomaru Garden at the foot of the castle hill was originally planted in 1636 by Kobori Enshu, a famed landscape artist and garden designer, but it was destroyed by fire in 1867. The current layout was created in 1968, based on a plan drawn up during the reign of the ninth shogun, Tokugawa Ieshige.

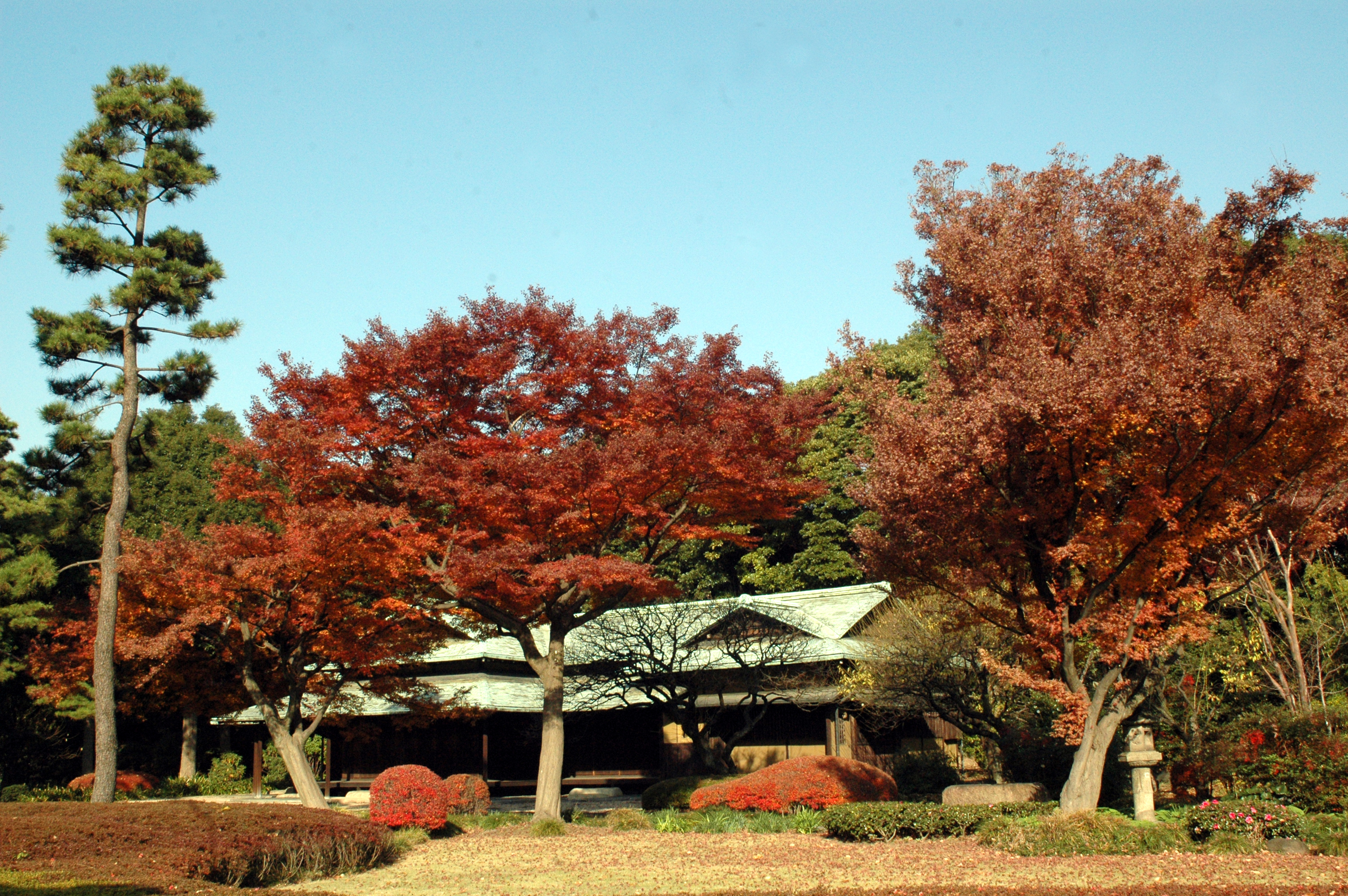
Suwano-chaya Tea House

=== Suwa no Chaya ===
The Suwa no Chaya (諏訪の茶屋) is a teahouse that was located in the Fukiage Garden during the Edo period. It moved to the Akasaka Palace after the Meiji restoration, but was reconstructed in its original location in 1912.

It was moved to its present location during the construction of the East Garden.

== Kitanomaru ==
The Kitanomaru Park is located to the north and is the former northern enceinte of Edo Castle. It is a public park and is the site of Nippon Budokan Hall.

This garden contains a bronze monument to Prince Kitashirakawa Yoshihisa (北白川宮能久親王, Kitashirakawa-no-miya Yoshihisa-shinnō).

== Kōkyo-gaien ==
The Kokyo Gaien National Garden consists of outer gardens that ring the Imperial Palace. It contains bronze monuments to Kusunoki Masashige (楠木正成) and Wake no Kiyomaro (和気清麻呂).

== Gallery ==
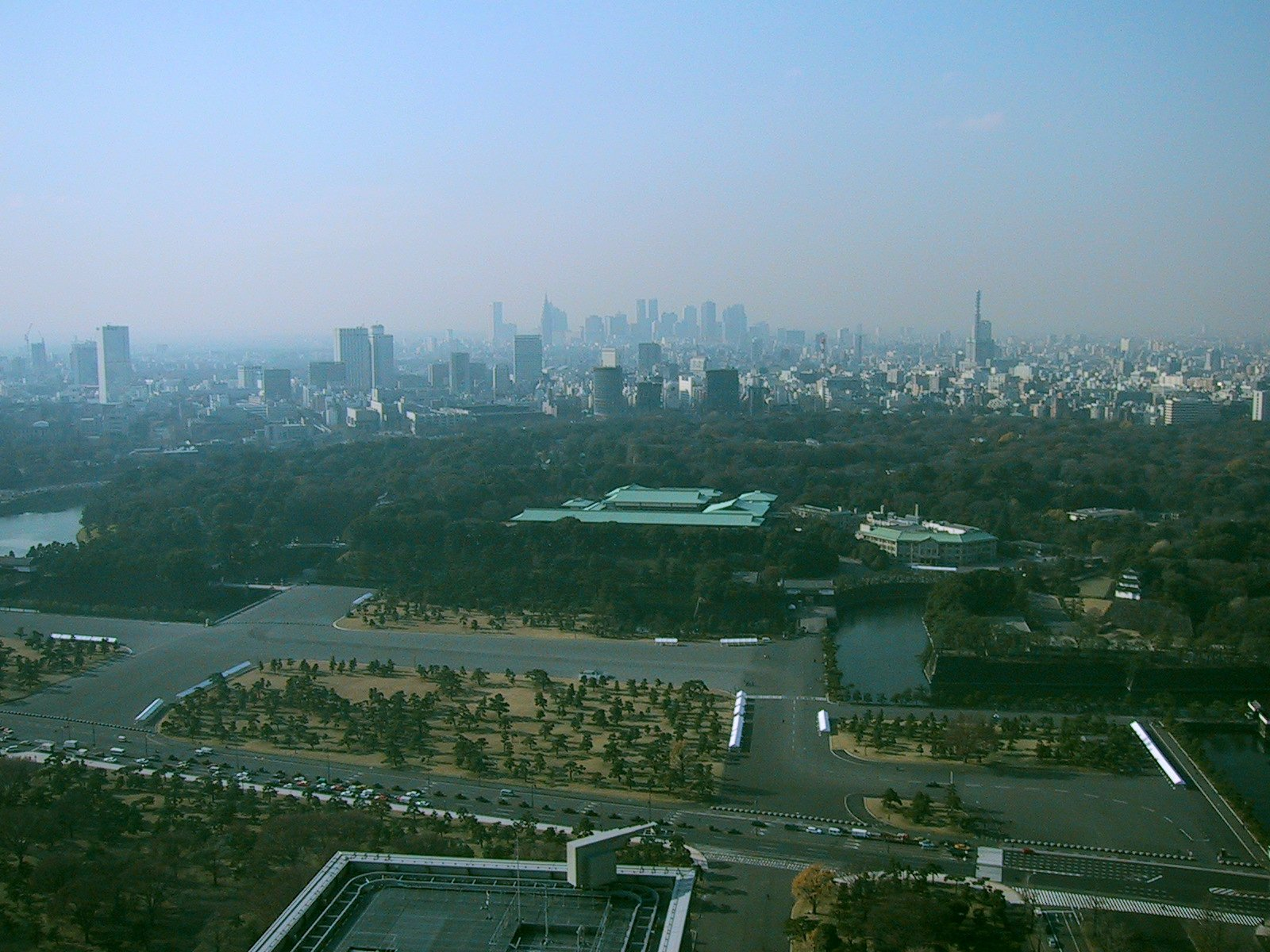
The Imperial Palace and the Imperial Household Agency

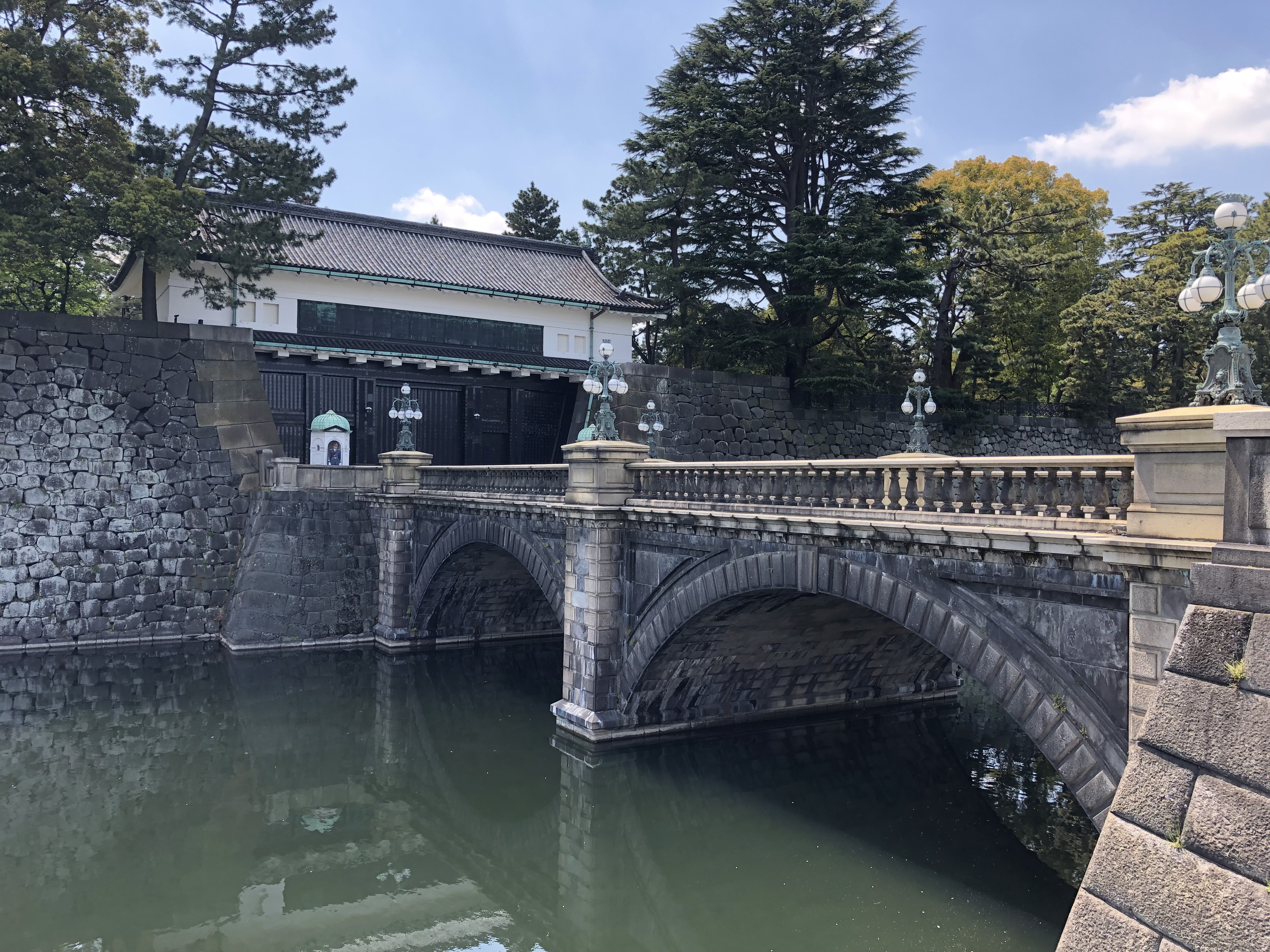
Seimon Ishibashi bridge

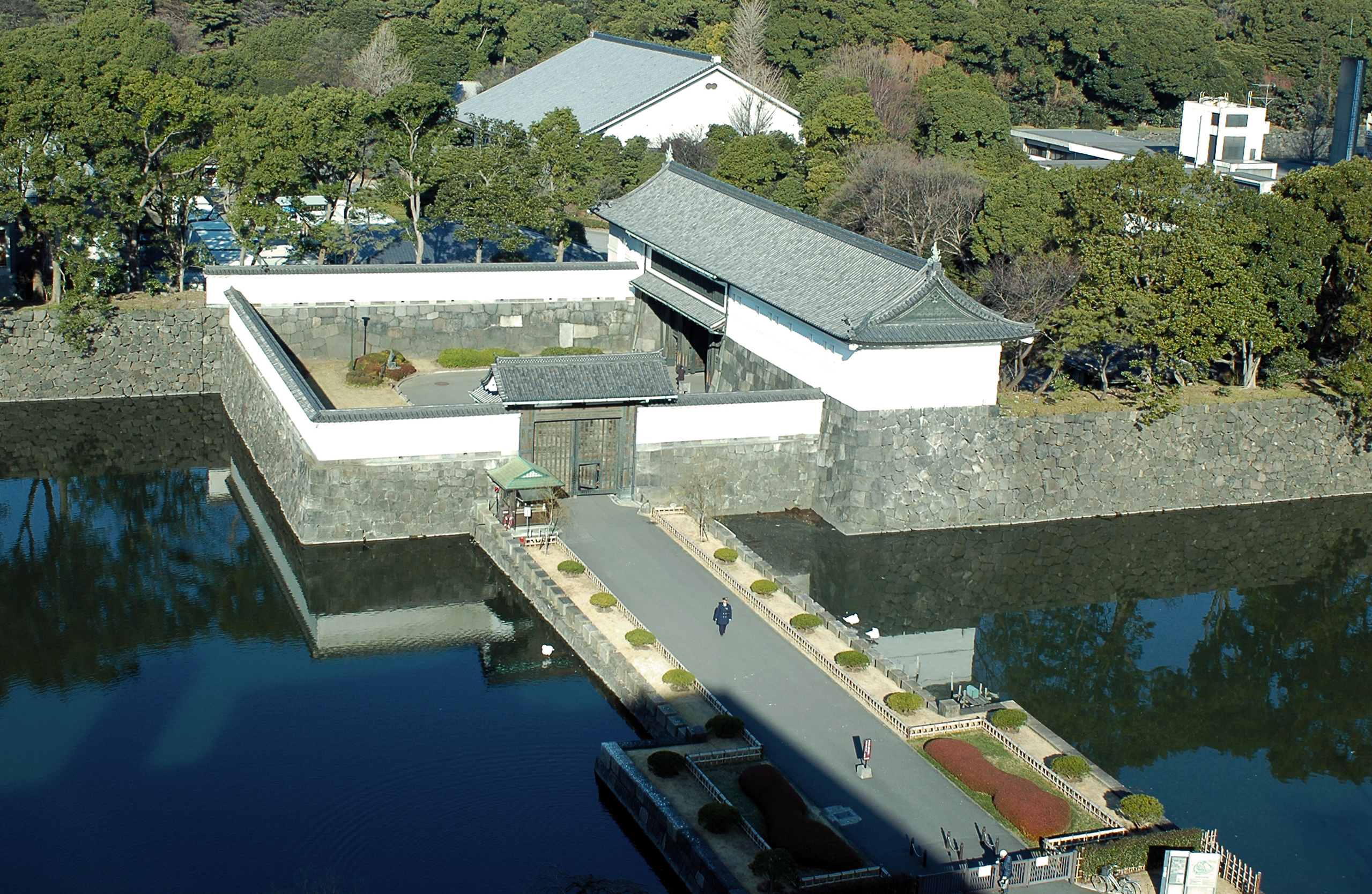
Ote-mon gate and main entrance to the East Garden

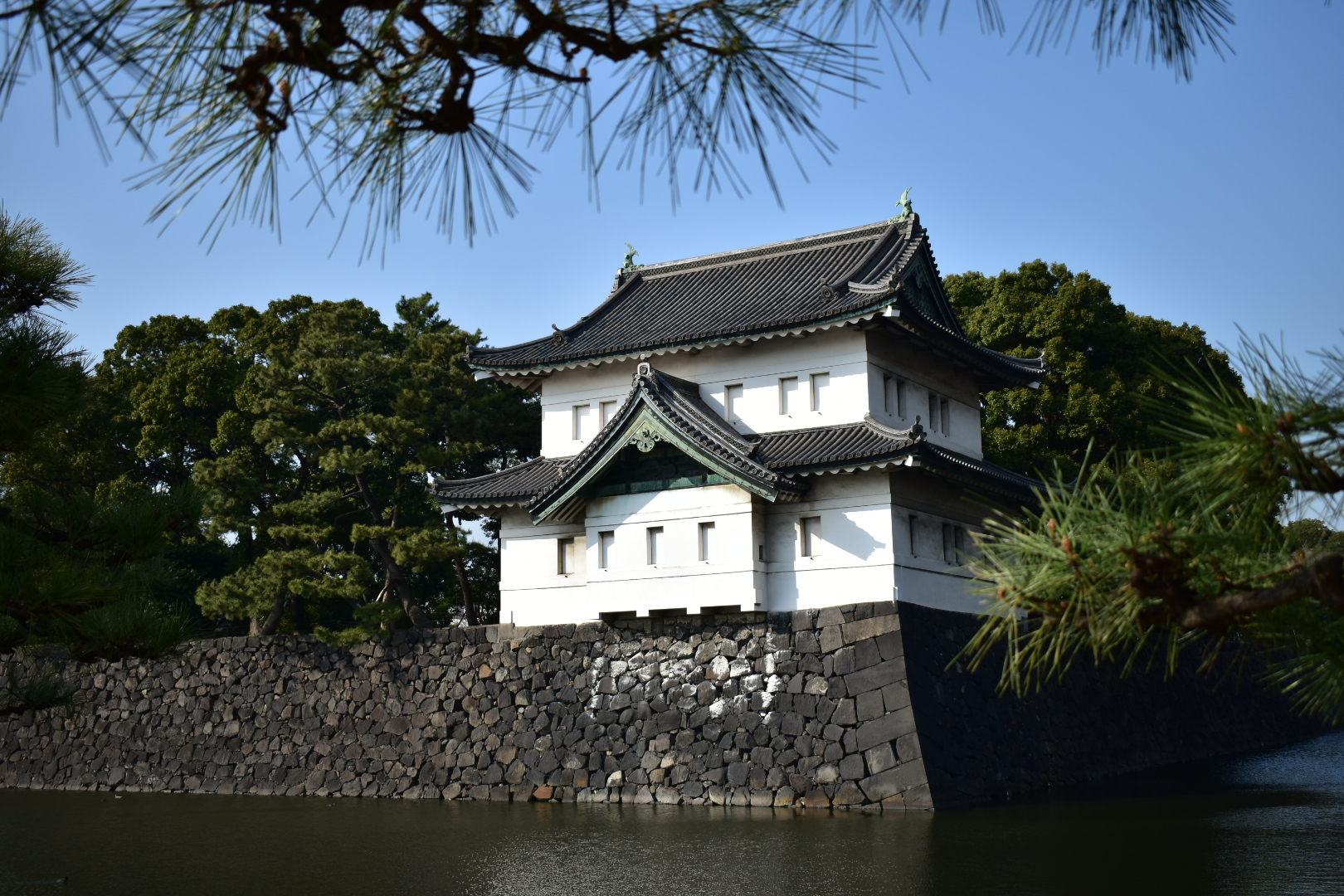
Imperial Palace moat and guard tower

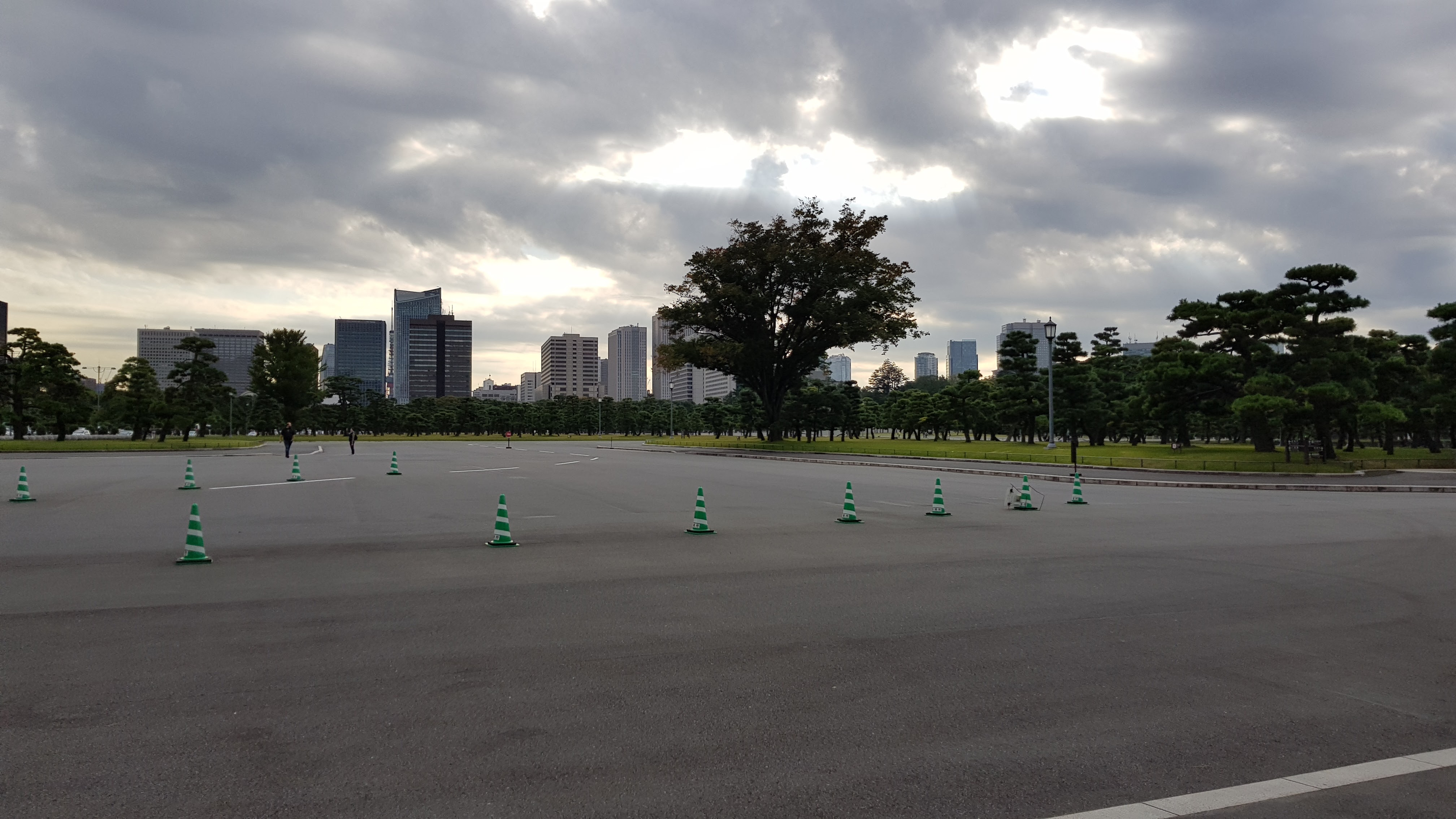
Imperial Palace front entrance field with Chiyoda office buildings in the background

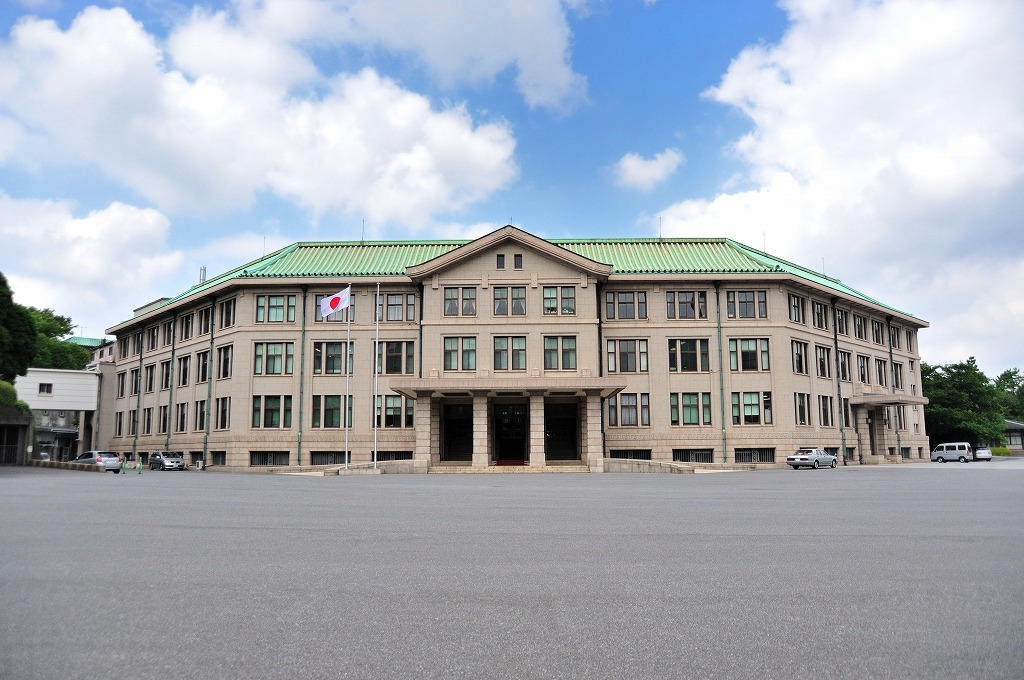
Building of the Imperial Household Agency on the grounds of the Imperial Palace

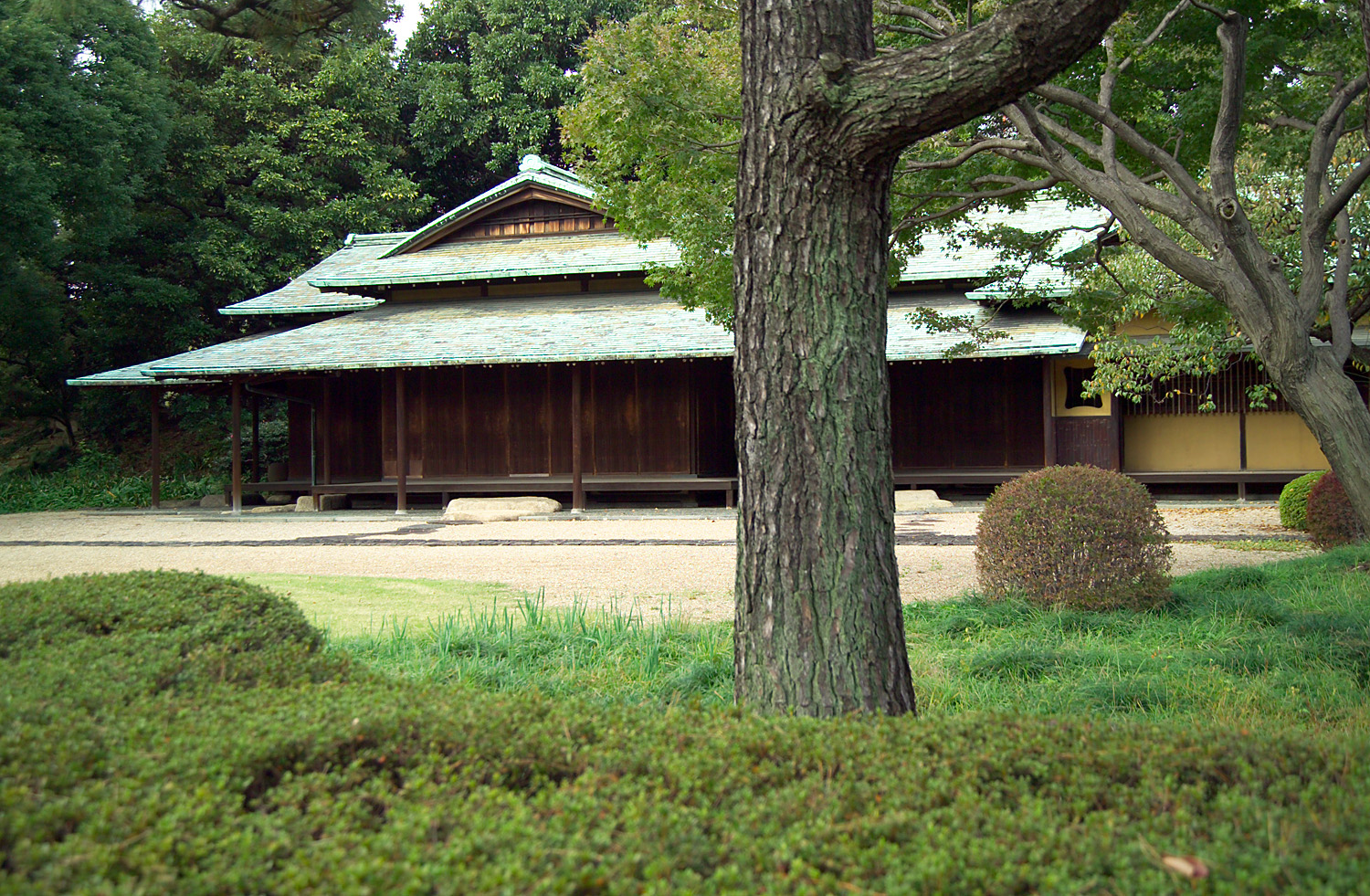
Suwa no chaya teahouse in the Ninomaru Garden

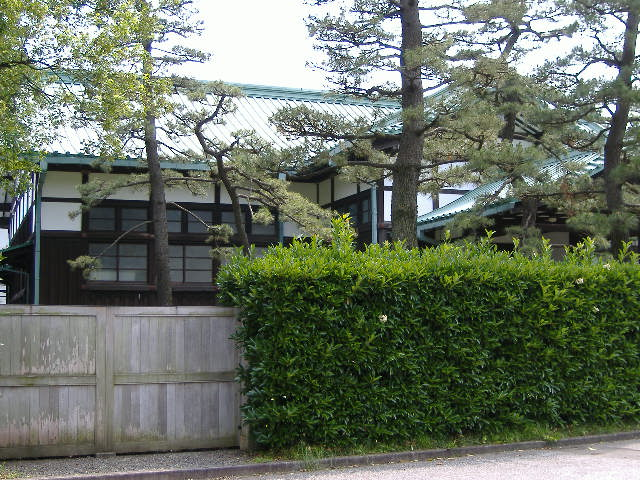
Saineikan dōjō for the guards

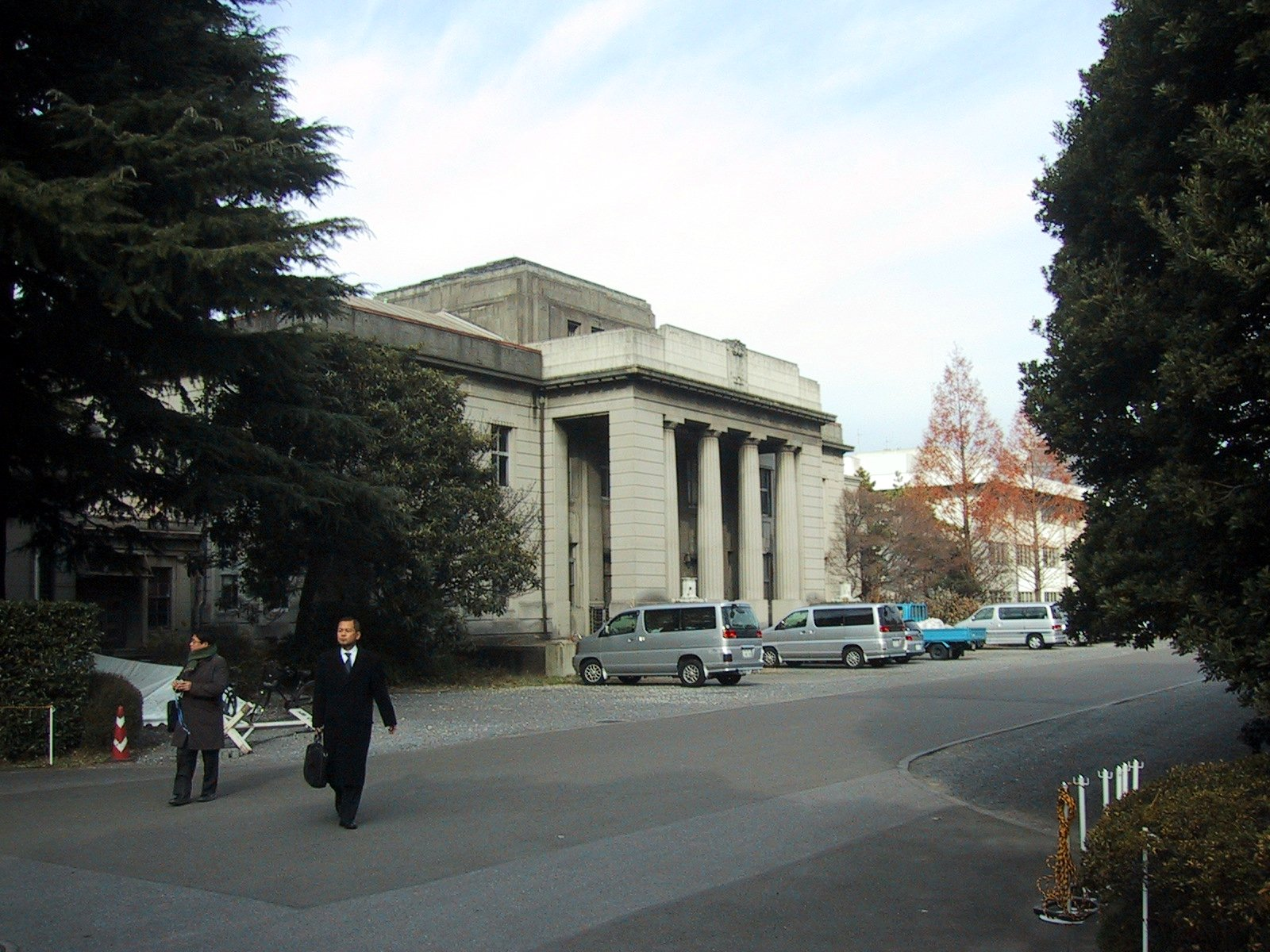
Building of the former Privy Council in the East Garden area, one of the few buildings from the pre-war Showa period

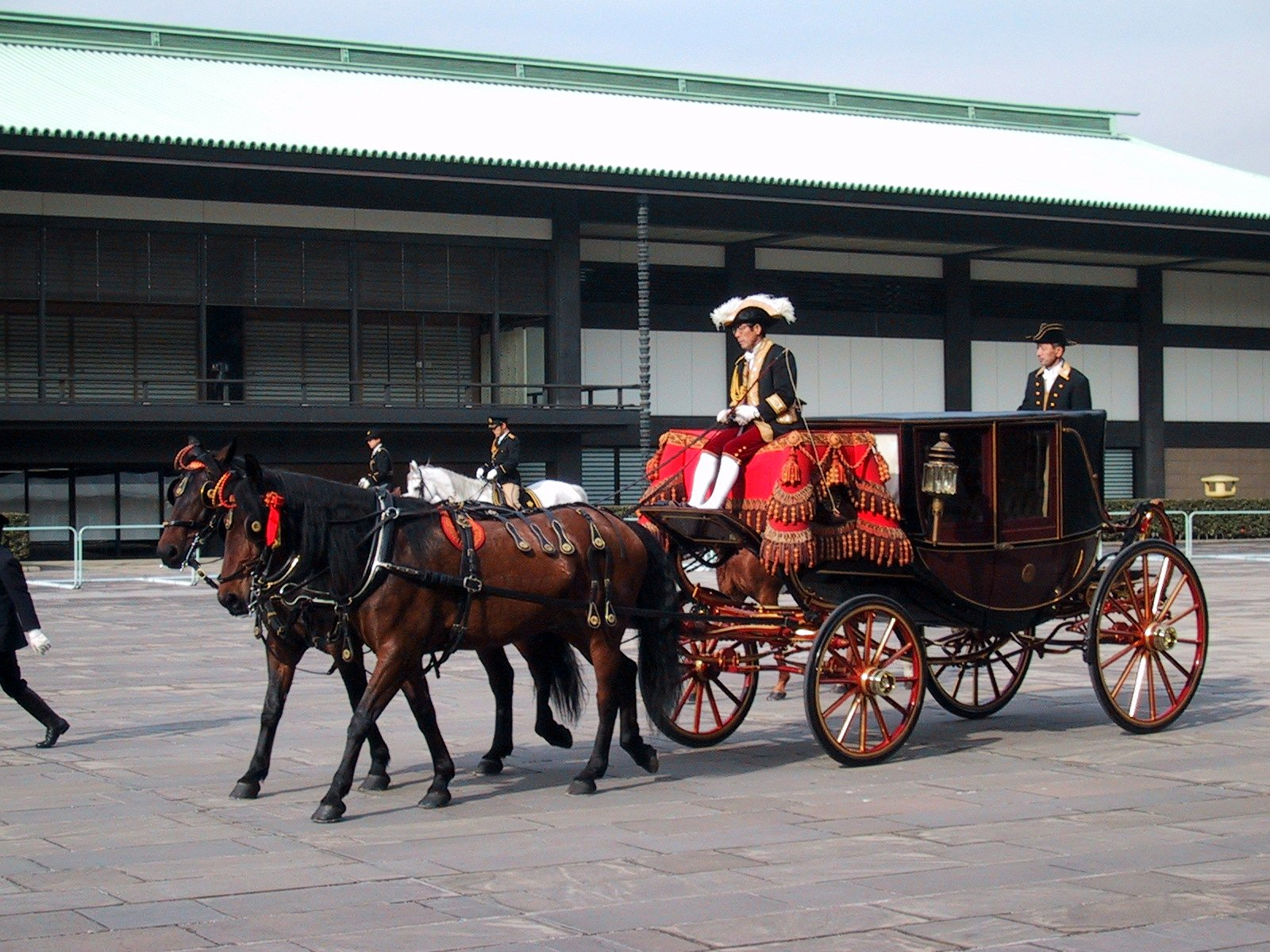
New ambassadors arrive at the palace to hand in their accreditation to the Emperor to be picked up from Tokyo Station either in a limousine or the carriage.

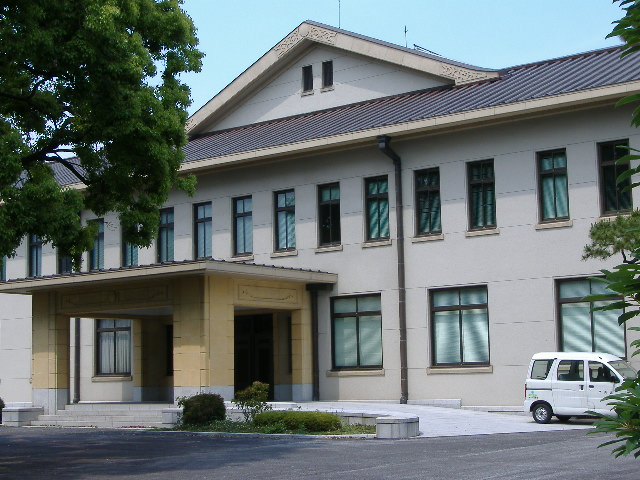
Music Department of the Board of Ceremonies

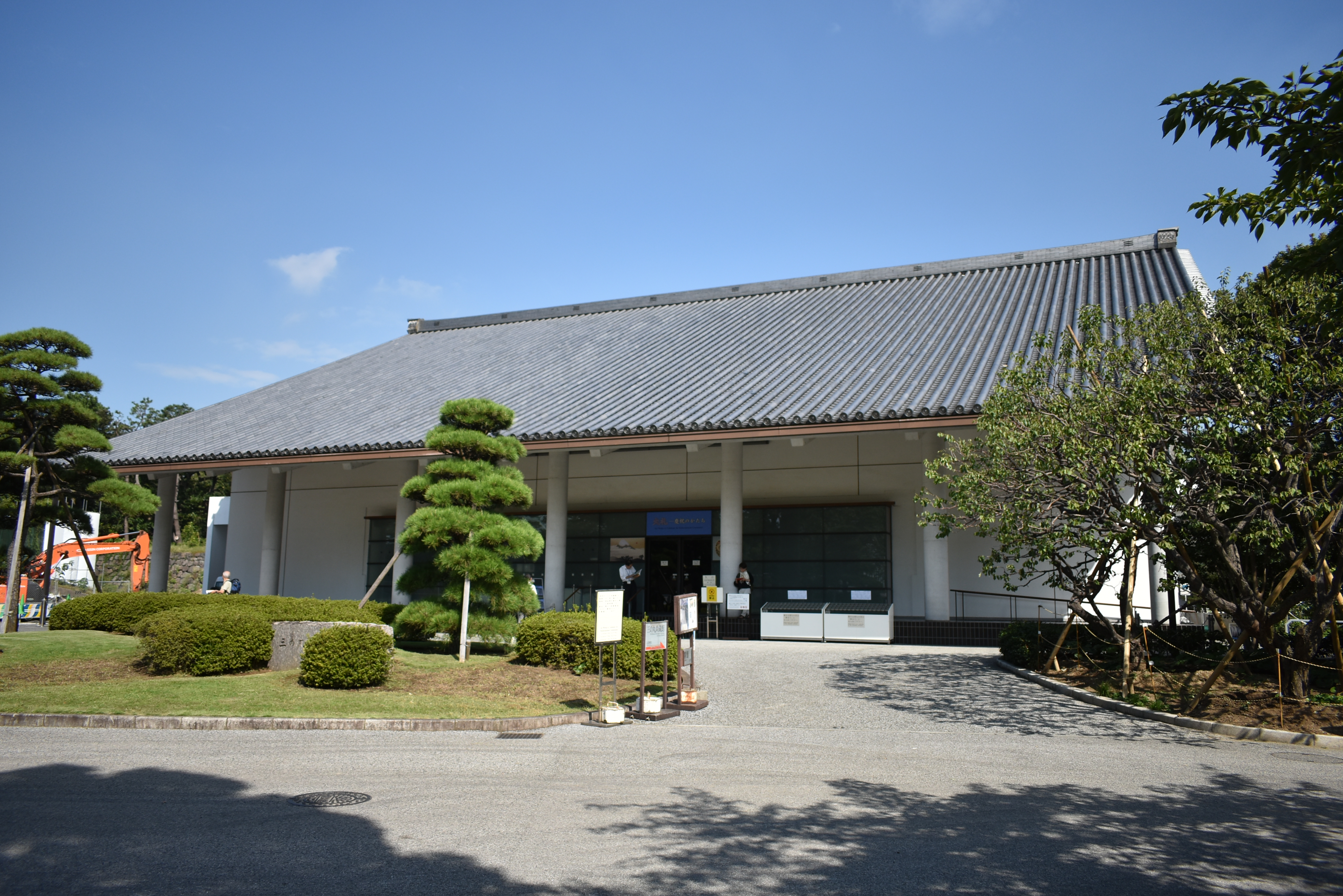
Museum of the Imperial Collections

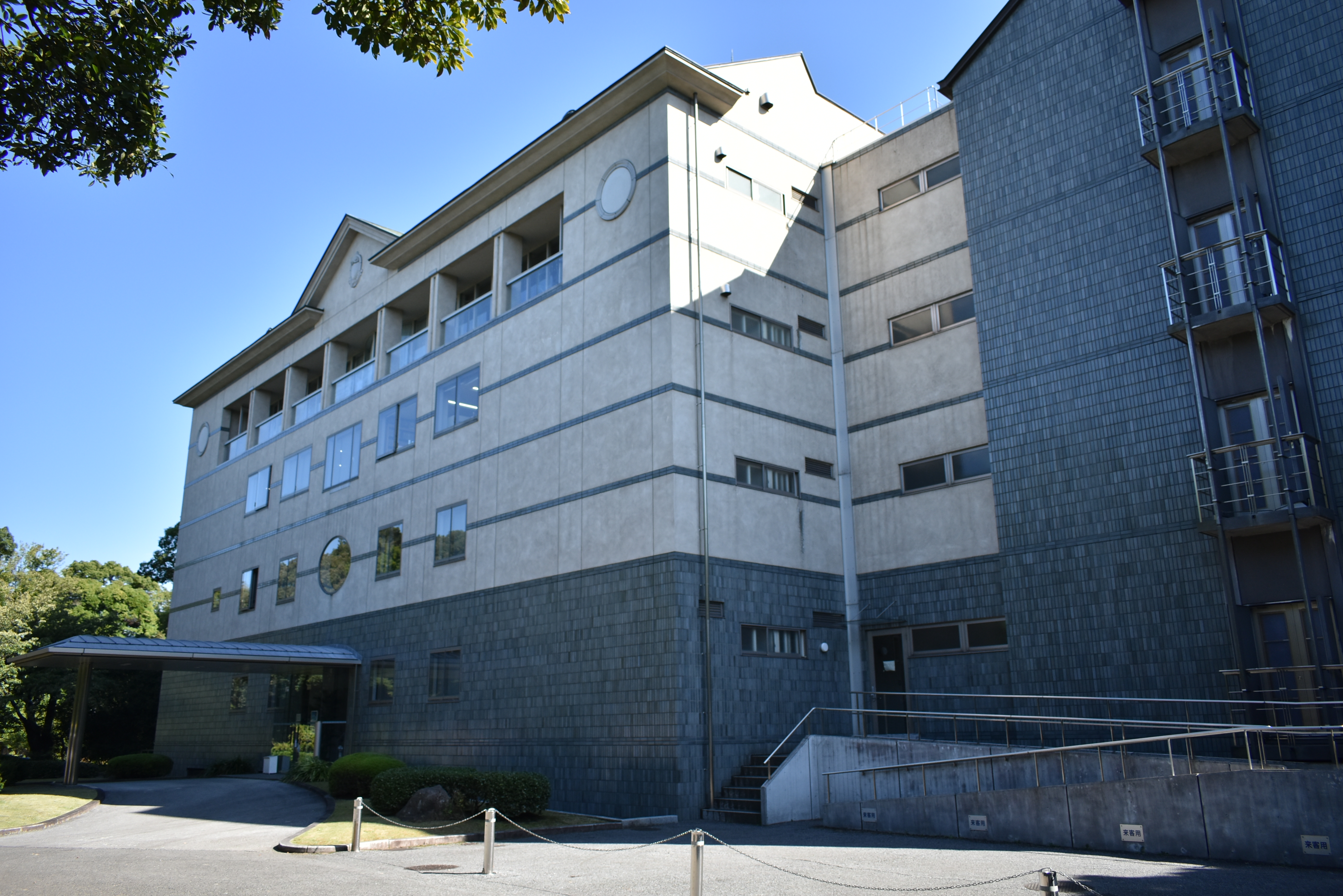
Archives and Mausolea Department

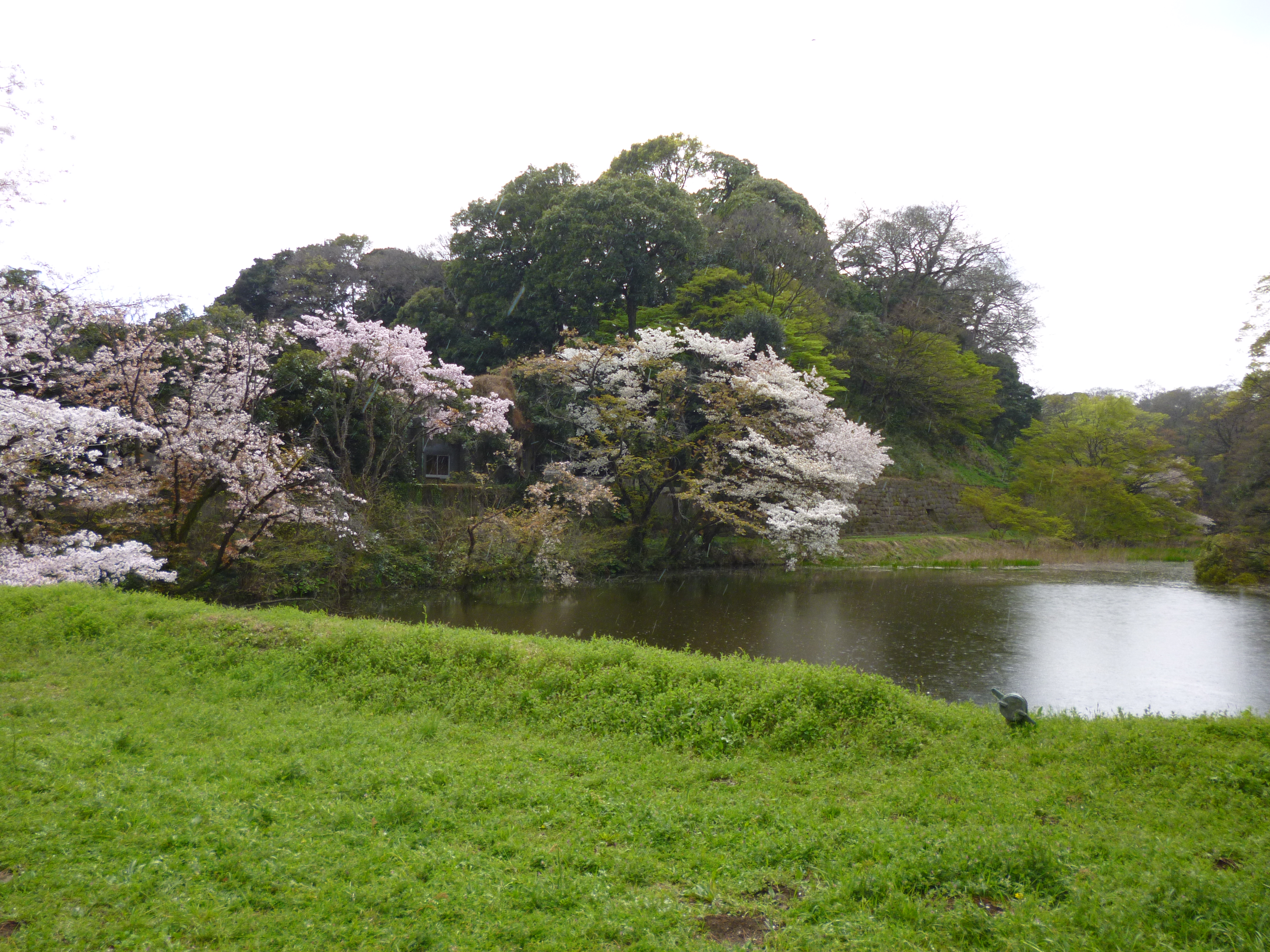
The moat of the Imperial Palace in spring

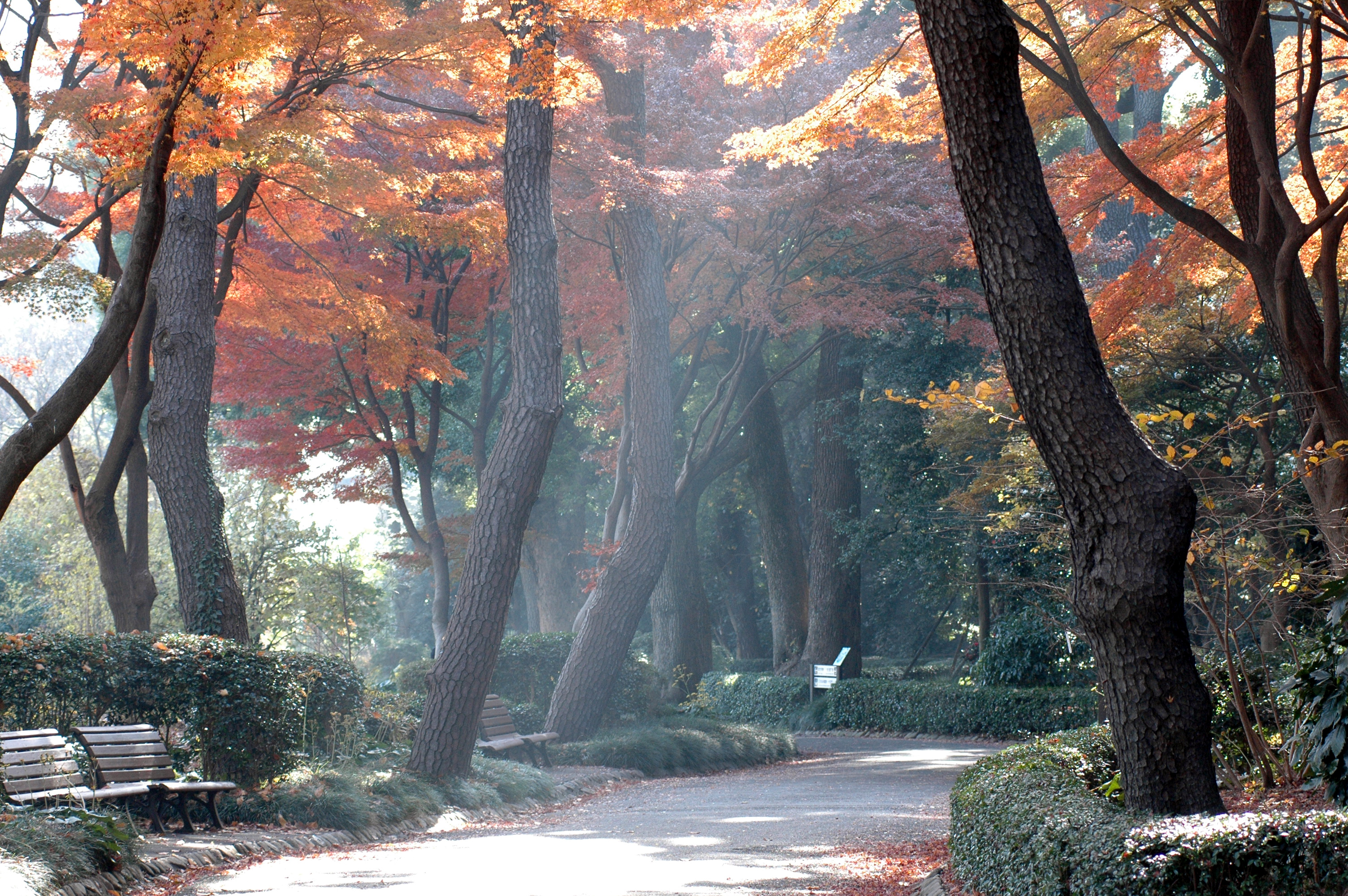
Public walkway, Edo East Garden

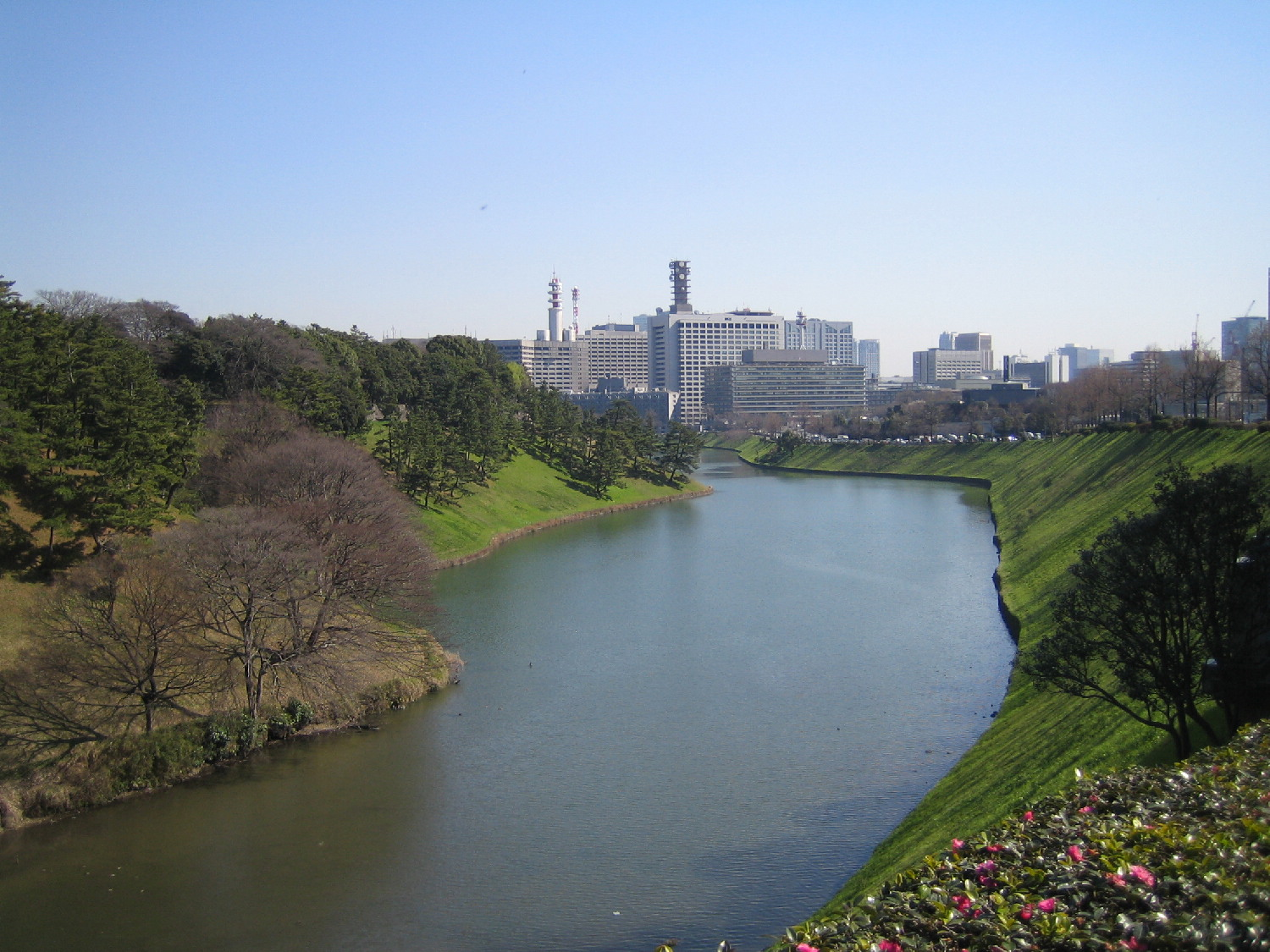
Moat of the Imperial Palace

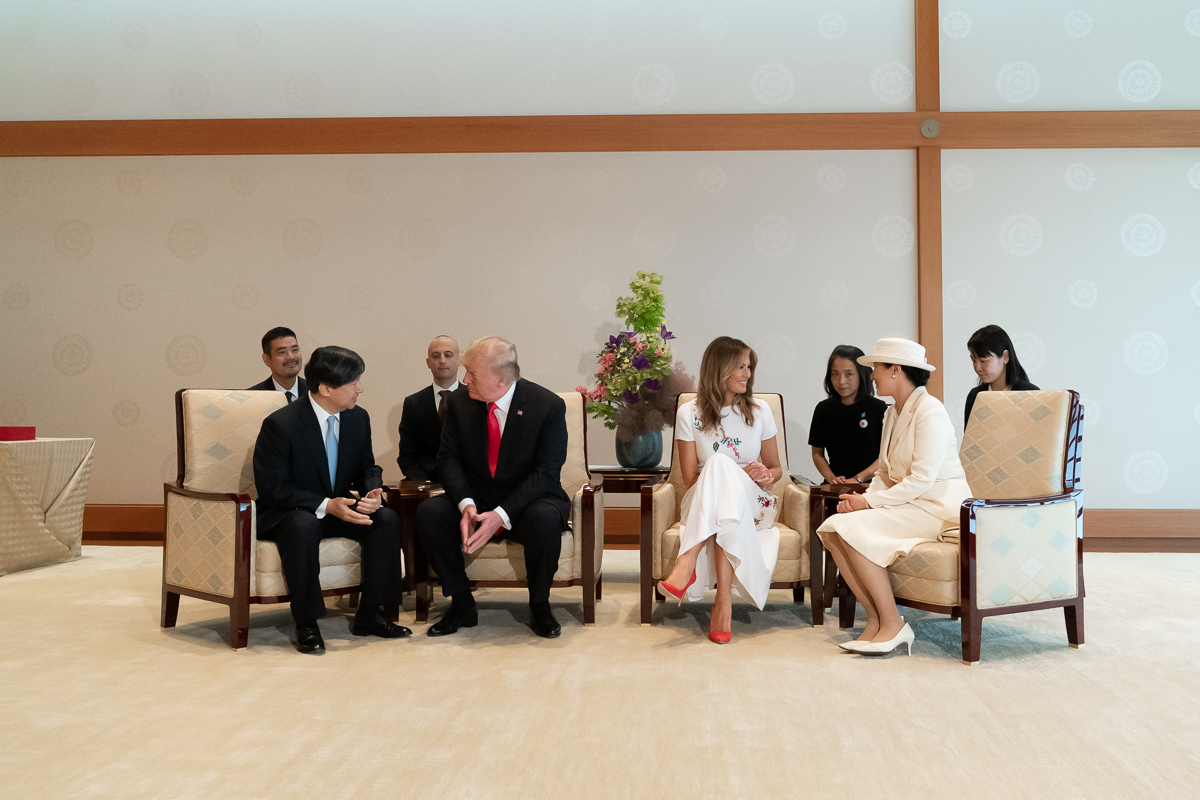
Meeting between Emperor Naruhito and U.S. President Donald Trump with First Lady Melania Trump and Empress Masako

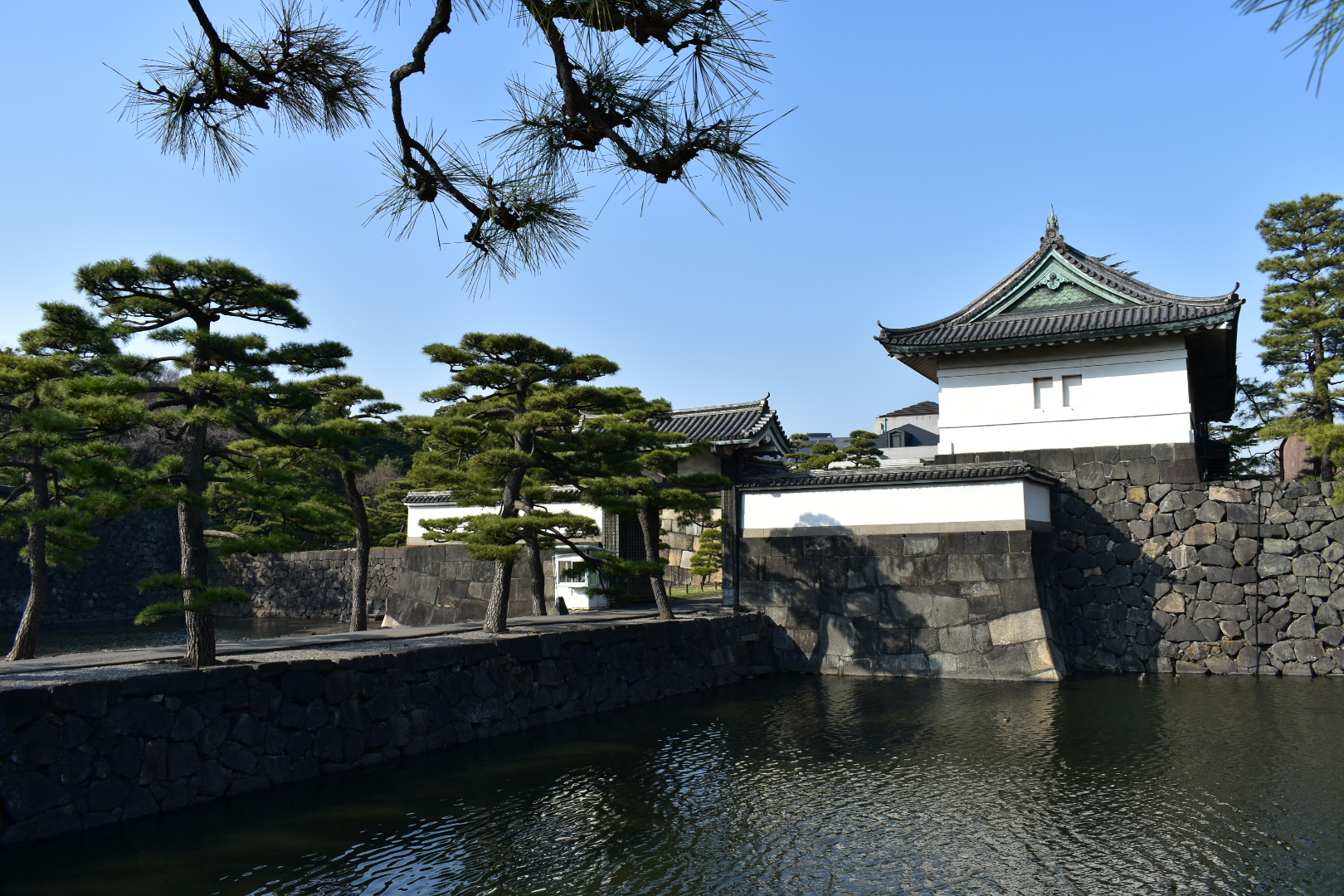
One of the entrances for supporting staff buildings

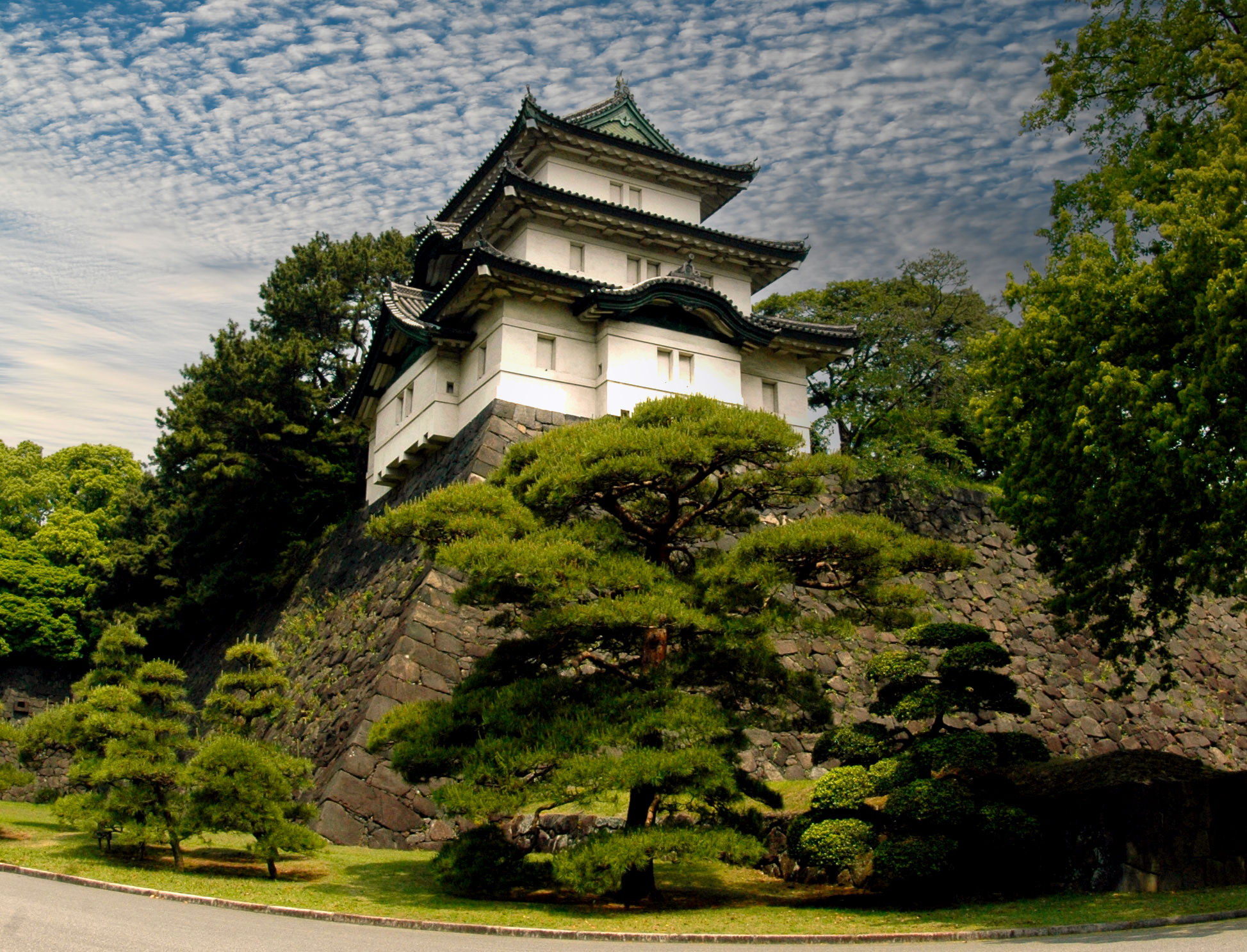
Fujimi-yagura (Mt Fuji-view keep), guard building within the inner grounds of the Imperial Palace

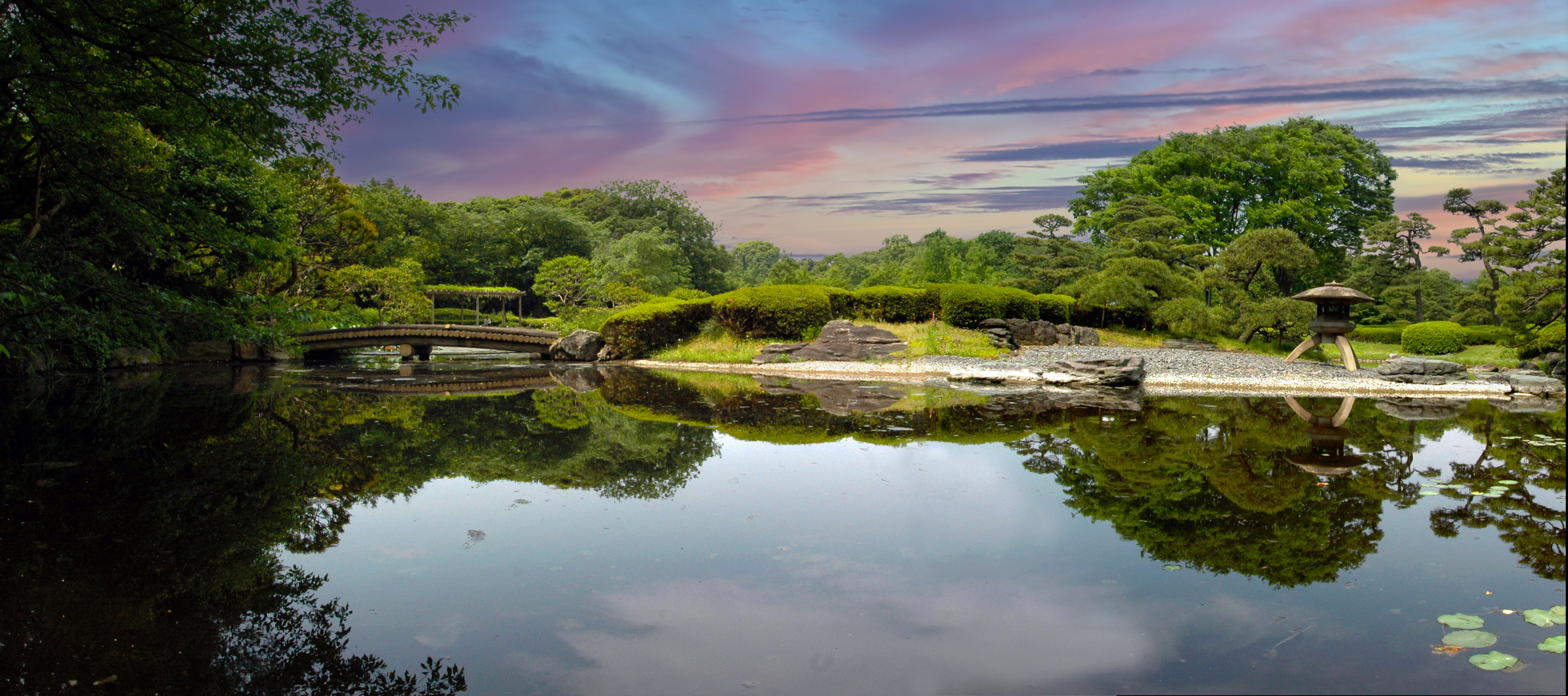
Pond in the East Garden

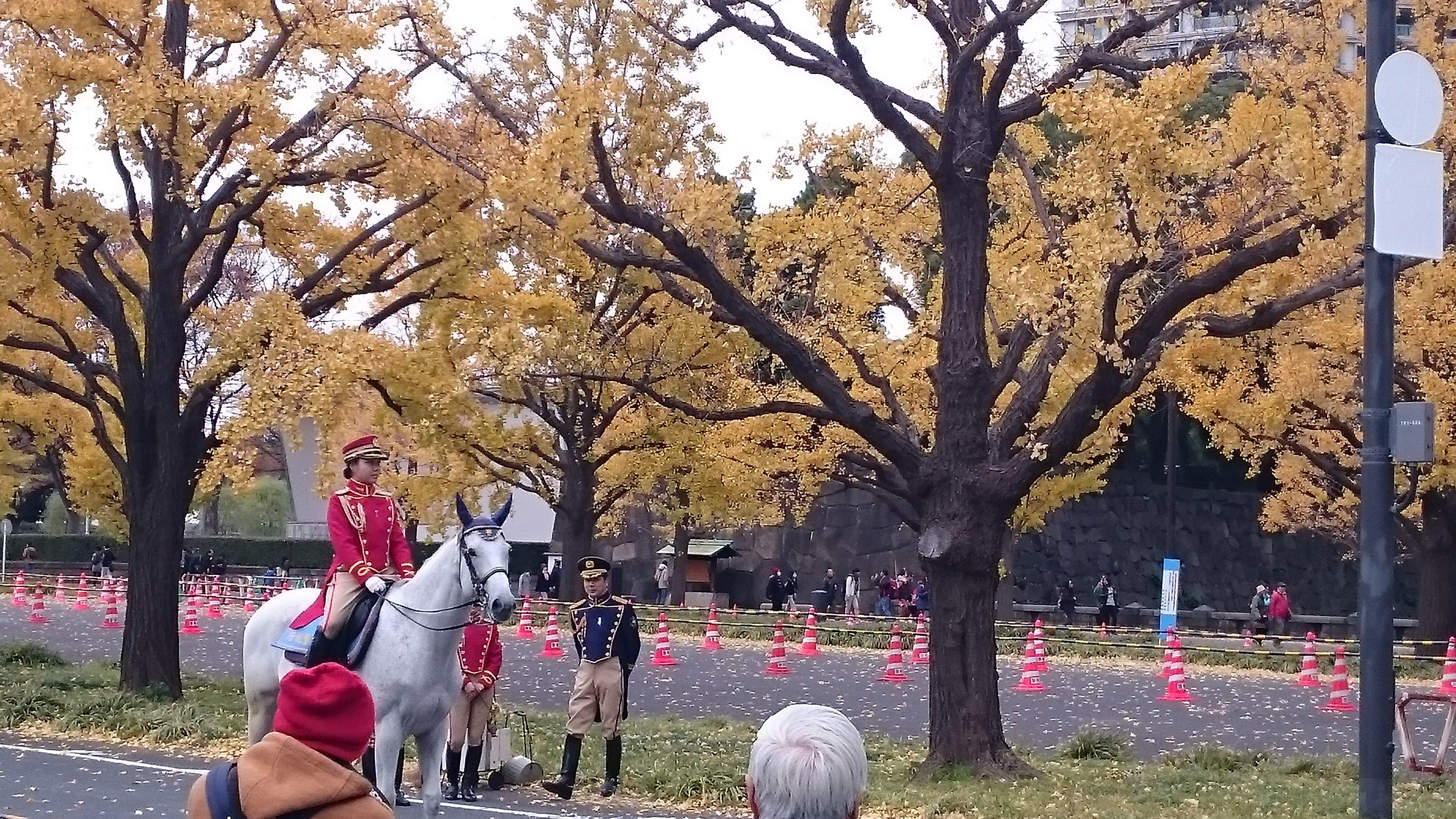
Mounted Imperial Police around the Imperial Palace
