= List of cultural properties of Japan – paintings (Shimane) =

This list is of the cultural properties of Japan designated in the category of paintings (絵画, kaiga) for the Prefecture of Shimane.

== National Cultural Properties ==
As of 25 February 2016, ten Important Cultural Properties have been designated, being of national significance.

Property	Date	Municipality	Ownership	Comments	Image	Dimensions	Coordinates	Ref.
Masuda Genshō, colour on silk, by Kanō Shōei 絹本著色益田元祥像〈狩野松栄筆／〉 kenpon chakushoku Masuda Genshō zō (Kanō Shōei hitsu)	Momoyama period	Masuda	Iwami Art Museum			108.4 centimetres (42.7 in) by 51.7 centimetres (20.4 in)	34°40′23″N 131°50′51″E	
Sankō Kokushi, colour on silk 絹本著色三光国師像 kenpon chakushoku Sankō Kokushi zō	Nanboku-chō period	Yasugi	Unju-ji (雲樹寺)				35°23′41″N 133°16′02″E	
Shō Kannon, colour on silk 絹本著色聖観音像 kenpon chakushoku Shō Kannon zō	Heian period	Unnan	Mine-ji (峰寺)				35°18′36″N 132°53′05″E	
Two Rivers and the White Path, colour on silk 絹本著色二河白道図 kenpon chakushoku Niga Byakudō zō	Kamakura period	Masuda	Manpuku-ji (萬福寺)			103.5 centimetres (40.7 in) by 41.0 centimetres (16.1 in)	34°40′43″N 131°51′36″E	
Mōri Motonari, colour on silk 絹本著色毛利元就像 kenpon chakushoku Mōri Motonari zō	Momoyama period	Izumo	Gakuen-ji (鰐淵寺)				35°25′23″N 132°44′55″E	
Masuda Kanetaka, colour on paper, with the seal of Sesshū 紙本著色益田兼尭像〈雪舟ノ印アリ／〉 shihon chakushoku Masuda Kanetaka zō (Sesshū no shirushi ari)	1479	Masuda	Sesshū Memorial Museum			82.8 centimetres (32.6 in) by 40.9 centimetres (16.1 in)	34°41′06″N 131°50′51″E	
Shinzō, colour on wooden boards, Honden wall paintings 板絵著色神像〈／（本殿板壁画）〉 ita-e chakushoku Shinzō (honden ita hekiga)	Muromachi period	Matsue	Yaegaki Jinja	3 panels			35°25′45″N 133°04′25″E	
Sacred Horse, colour on wooden boards, by Kanō Hideyori 板絵著色神馬図〈狩野秀賴筆／〉 ita-e chakushoku shinma zu (Kanō Hideyori hitsu)	1569	Ōnan	Kamo Jinja (賀茂神社)	2 panels			34°54′17″N 132°27′44″E	
Sannō Honjibutsu, colour on silk 絹本著色山王本地仏像 kenpon chakushoku Sannō honji butsu zō	Kamakura period	Izumo	Gakuen-ji (鰐淵寺)				35°25′23″N 132°44′55″E	
Mandala of the One-Syllable Golden Wheel, colour on silk 絹本著色一字金輪曼荼羅図 kenpon chakushoku ichiji kenrin mandara zu	Kamakura period	Izumo	Gakuen-ji (鰐淵寺)				35°25′23″N 132°44′55″E	

== Prefectural Cultural Properties ==
As of 25 February 2016, thirty-six properties have been designated at a prefectural level.

Property	Date	Municipality	Ownership	Comments	Image	Dimensions	Coordinates	Ref.
Ema 絵馬 ema	1592	Ōda	Kiyomizu-dera (清水寺)	2 ema by Kanō Shigenobu (狩野重信)			35°06′18″N 132°26′13″E	for all refs see
Daiō Kokushi, ink on paper, by Hakuin 紙本墨画大応国師図白隠筆 shihon bokuga Daiō kokushi zu Hakuin hitsu	1764–72	Matsue	Tenrin-ji (天倫寺)				35°27′59″N 133°02′15″E	
Daitō Kokushi, ink on paper, by Hakuin 紙本墨画大燈国師図白隠筆 shihon bokuga Daitō kokushi zu Hakuin hitsu	1764–72	Matsue	Tenrin-ji (天倫寺)				35°27′59″N 133°02′15″E	
Kanzan Kokushi, ink on paper, by Hakuin 紙本墨画関山国師図白隠筆 shihon bokuga Kanzan kokushi zu Hakuin hitsu	1764–72	Matsue	Tenrin-ji (天倫寺)				35°27′59″N 133°02′15″E	
Shaka coming forth from the Mountains, ink on paper, by Hakuin 紙本墨画出山釈迦図白隠筆 shihon bokuga shussan Shaka zu Hakuin hitsu	1764–72	Matsue	Tenrin-ji (天倫寺)				35°27′59″N 133°02′15″E	
Mandala of the Two Realms, colour on silk 絹本著色両界曼荼羅図 kenpon chakushoku ryōkai mandara zu	late Kamakura period	Izumo	Gakuen-ji (鰐淵寺)	pair of scrolls			35°25′23″N 132°44′55″E	
Tendai Daishi, colour on silk 絹本著色天台大師像 kenpon chakushoku ryōkai mandara zō	Kamakura period	Izumo	Gakuen-ji (鰐淵寺)				35°25′23″N 132°44′55″E	
Shaka Triad with Sixteen Benevolent Deities, colour on silk 絹本著色釈迦三尊十六善神像 kenpon chakushoku Shaka sanzon jūroku zenjin zō	Nanboku-chō period	Izumo	Gakuen-ji (鰐淵寺)				35°25′23″N 132°44′55″E	
Fudō Myōō, colour on silk 絹本著色不動明王像 kenpon chakushoku Fudō Myōō zō	late Kamakura to Nanboku-chō period	Izumo	Gakuen-ji (鰐淵寺)				35°25′23″N 132°44′55″E	
Monju Bosatsu, colour on silk 絹本著色文殊菩薩像 kenpon chakushoku Monju Bosatsu zō	Nanboku-chō period	Izumo	Gakuen-ji (鰐淵寺)				35°25′23″N 132°44′55″E	
Seed Mandala of the Two Realms, colour on silk 絹本著色種子両界曼荼羅図 kenpon chakushoku shuji ryōkai mandara zu	Muromachi period	Izumo	Gakuen-ji (鰐淵寺)	pair of scrolls			35°25′23″N 132°44′55″E	
Nirvana painting, colour on silk 絹本著色仏涅槃図 kenpon chakushoku Butsu nehan zu	Muromachi period	Ōda	Kiyomizu-dera (清水寺)				35°06′18″N 132°26′13″E	
Nishi Amane, oil on hemp cloth, by Takahashi Yuichi 西周肖像 高橋由一筆 油絵麻布; Nishi Amane shōzō Takahashi Yuichi hitsu abura-e mafu	1893	Tsuwano	Tsuwano Kyōdokan (津和野町郷土館)				34°27′56″N 131°46′24″E	
Old Woman, oil on hemp cloth, by Ishibashi Kazunori 老女 石橋和訓筆 油絵麻布 rōjo Ishibashi Kazunori hitsu abura-e mafu	1919	Izumo	private					
Sixteen Arhats, colour on silk 絹本著色十六羅漢像図 kenpon chakushoku jūroku rakan zōzu	Muromachi period	Tsuwano	Yōmei-ji (永明寺)	16 scrolls			34°28′11″N 131°46′12″E	
Shoin Fusuma Paintings 書院襖絵 shoin fusuma-e	Muromachi period	Masuda	Manpuku-ji (萬福寺)	32 panels, comprising, in ink, eight with landscape with pavilions and twelve with landscape; and, in ink with light colour, four with court ladies and eight with reeds and geese			34°40′43″N 131°51′36″E	
Bugaku, colour on paper with gold ground 紙本金地著色舞楽図 shihon kinji chakushoku bugaku zu	early Edo period	Izumo	Izumo Taisha	pair of six-panel screens			35°24′07″N 132°41′08″E	
Fudō Myōō with Two Attendants, colour on silk 絹本著色不道明王二童子像 kenpon chakushoku Fudō Myōō ni dōji zō	late Kamakura period	Unnan	Mine-ji (峰寺)				35°18′36″N 132°53′05″E	
Amida Triad, colour on silk 絹本著色阿弥陀三尊像 kenpon chakushoku Amida sanson zō	Goryeo	Izumo	Ichibata-ji (一畑寺)	Goryeo Buddhist painting			35°29′48″N 132°52′27″E	
Shoin Partition Paintings, ink and colour on paper 紙本墨画著色書院障壁画 shihon bokuga chakushoku shoin shōhekiga	1815	Izumo	Ichibata-ji (一畑寺)	22 panels			35°29′48″N 132°52′27″E	
Imperial Messengers Visiting Temples, colour on paper 紙本著色勅使代参向図 shihon chakushoku chokushi daisankō zu	early Edo period	Matsue	Rokusho Jinja (六所神社)	5 scrolls, 1 panel			35°25′38″N 133°06′15″E	
Legends of Taimasan, ink and light colour on paper 紙本墨画淡彩大麻山縁起 shihon bokuga tansai Taimasan engi	1592	Hamada	Taimasan Jinja (大麻山神社)	one handscroll			34°49′12″N 132°00′38″E	
Twelve Heavenly Deities, colour on silk 絹本著色十二天像 kenpon chakushoku jūni ten zō	Muromachi period	Unnan	Mine-ji (峰寺)	12 scrolls			35°18′36″N 132°53′05″E	
Eight Patriarchs of the Shingon Sect, colour on silk 絹本著色真言八祖像 kenpon chakushoku Shingon hasso zō	Muromachi period	Unnan	Mine-ji (峰寺)	8 scrolls			35°18′36″N 132°53′05″E	
Monju Bosatsu Riding a Lion, colour on silk 絹本著色騎獅子文殊像附養法院寄進状１通 kenpon chakushoku kishishi Monju zō tsuketari Yōhōin kishin jō ichi tsū	late C12	Matsue	Gesshō-ji (月照寺)				35°28′18″N 133°02′24″E	
Fudō Myōō, colour on silk 絹本著色不動明王像 kenpon chakushoku Fudō Myōō zō	Kamakura period	Ōda	Kiyomizu-dera (清水寺)				35°06′18″N 132°26′13″E	
Amago Tsunehisa, colour on silk 絹本著色尼子経久像 kenpon chakushoku Amago Tsunehisa zō	Muromachi period	Matsue	Tōkō-ji (洞光寺)	commentary dating to 1490		90.7 centimetres (2 ft 11.7 in) by 38.7 centimetres (1 ft 3.2 in)	35°27′21″N 133°03′21″E	
Shaka with Sixteen Benevolent Deities, colour on silk 絹本著色釈迦十六善神像 kenpon chakushoku Shaka jūroku zenjin zō	Nanboku-chō period	Masuda	Senkō-ji (泉光寺)				34°40′34″N 131°51′04″E	
Mandala of the Two Realms, colour on silk 絹本著色両界曼荼羅図 kenpon chakushoku ryōkai mandara zu	Muromachi period	Matsue	Kōshō-ji (迎接寺)	pair of scrolls; dedicated in 1524			35°26′36″N 133°07′08″E	
Fudō Myōō, colour on silk 絹本著色不動明王像 kenpon chakushoku Fudō Myōō zō	Nanboku-chō period	Ōda	Kiyomizu-dera (清水寺)				35°06′18″N 132°26′13″E	
Beautiful Lady Reading Poetry, oil on canvas, by Ishibashi Kazunori 美人読詩（額装）石橋和訓筆 カンバス・油彩 bijin dokushi (gakusō) Ishibashi Kazunori hitsu abura-e mafu	1906	Matsue	Shimane Prefecture (kept at Shimane Art Museum)			99.5 centimetres (3 ft 3.2 in) by 88.3 centimetres (2 ft 10.8 in)	35°27′35″N 133°03′09″E	
The Fifty-three Stations of the Tōkaidō by Hiroshige, nishiki-e 版画東海道五十三次 安藤広重筆錦絵横大判 hanga Tōkaidō gojūsan tsugi Andō Hiroshige hitsu nishiki-e yoko ōban	1833	Matsue	Shimane Prefecture (kept at Shimane Art Museum)	55 prints		23.7 centimetres (9.3 in) by 36.2 centimetres (1 ft 2.3 in)	35°27′35″N 133°03′09″E	
Fine Wind, Clear Morning by Hokusai, nishiki-e 版画凱風快晴図 葛飾北斎筆錦絵横大判 hanga gaifū kaisei zu Katsushika Hokusai hitsu nishiki-e yoko ōban	1831–33	Matsue	Shimane Prefecture (kept at Shimane Art Museum)			25.0 centimetres (9.8 in) by 36.8 centimetres (1 ft 2.5 in)	35°27′35″N 133°03′09″E	
The Great Wave off Kanagawa by Hokusai, nishiki-e 版画神奈川沖浪裏図 葛飾北斎筆錦絵横大判 hanga Kanagawa oki nami ura zu Katsushika Hokusai hitsu nishiki-e yoko ōban	1831–33	Matsue	Shimane Prefecture (kept at Shimane Art Museum)			25.0 centimetres (9.8 in) by 36.8 centimetres (1 ft 2.5 in)	35°27′35″N 133°03′09″E	
Rainstorm Beneath the Summit by Hokusai, nishiki-e 版画山下白雨図 葛飾北斎筆錦絵横大判 hanga sanka hakū zu Katsushika Hokusai hitsu nishiki-e yoko ōban	1831–33	Matsue	Shimane Prefecture (kept at Shimane Art Museum)	from Thirty-six Views of Mount Fuji			35°27′35″N 133°03′09″E	
Tako Tokitaka, colour on silk 絹本著色多胡辰敬像 kenpon chakushoku Tako Tokitaka zō		Masuda	Enkō-ji (円光寺)				35°13′07″N 132°30′46″E	

== Municipal Cultural Properties ==
Properties designated at a municipal level include:

Property	Date	Municipality	Ownership	Comments	Image	Dimensions	Coordinates	Ref.
Sasakura Hachiman-gū Ema 笹倉八幡宮絵馬; Sasakura Hachimangū ema	late Edo period	Masuda	Sasakura Hachiman-gū (笹倉八幡宮)	fourteen ema by Okano Tōzan (岡野洞山)			34°39′55″N 131°55′08″E	for all refs see
Flowers and Birds, colour on paper 紙本着色花鳥図 shihon chakushoku kachō zu	C15	Masuda	Sesshū Memorial Museum	three scrolls remounted from a byōbu; attributed to Sesshū		147.0 centimetres (57.9 in) by 57.5 centimetres (22.6 in)	34°41′06″N 131°50′51″E	
Landscape, ink and light colour on paper, byōbu 紙本墨画淡彩山水図屏風 shihon bokuga tansai sansui zu byōbu	early Edo period	Masuda	Sesshū Memorial Museum	pair of six-fold scrolls; by Unkoku Tōeki (雲谷等益)		150.0 centimetres (59.1 in) by 356.4 centimetres (140.3 in)	34°41′06″N 131°50′51″E	
Daruma, Ikuzanshu, and Seiōgyū, ink on paper 紙本墨画達磨、郁山主、政黄牛 shihon bokuga Daruma, Ikuzanshu, Seiōgyū	early Edo period	Masuda	Sesshū Memorial Museum	three scrolls by Unkoku Tōeki (雲谷等益)			34°41′06″N 131°50′51″E	
Sailing Boats in the Autumn Bay and Travel in the Snow-covered Mountains, ink on paper 紙本墨画秋江帆舟図、雪山行旅図 shihon bokuga shūkō hansen zu, yukiyama kōryo zu	early Edo period	Masuda	Sesshū Memorial Museum	pair of scrolls by Unkoku Tōeki (雲谷等益)			34°41′06″N 131°50′51″E	
Lotus and Heron, ink on silk 絹本墨画蓮鷺図 kenpon bokuga renro zu	early Edo period	Masuda	Sesshū Memorial Museum	by Saitō Tōshitsu (斎藤等室)			34°41′06″N 131°50′51″E	
Daruma, ink on paper, by Unkoku Tōoku 紙本墨画達磨図 雲谷等屋筆 shihon bokuga Daruma zu Unkoku Tōoku hitsu	Momoyama period	Masuda	Sesshū Memorial Museum				34°41′06″N 131°50′51″E	

== See also ==
- Cultural Properties of Japan
- List of National Treasures of Japan (paintings)
- Japanese painting
