= Atlas of Brutalist Architecture =

Brutalist architecture reference book

- Editor: Virginia McLeod
- Cover artist: Joost Grootens
- Language: English
- Subject: Brutalist buildings worldwide
- Publisher: Phaidon Press
- Publication date: 2018 (2nd edition: 2020)
- Publication place: London; New York
- Pages: 568
- ISBN: 978-1-83866-190-8
- OCLC: 1153068692
- Dewey Decimal: 724.6
- LC Class: NA682.B7 A85 2020

The Atlas of Brutalist Architecture is a large-format reference book, that profiles 868 buildings worldwide associated with the canon of brutalist architecture. Each entry has an approximately 200 word description of the building, plus one or more black and white photographs for each structure. It was first published by Phaidon Press in 2018, and continues to be reprinted based on the 2020 second edition. The book was edited by Virginia McLeod.

== Background ==
Phaidon Press, based in London and New York, specialises in art, design and architecture publishing, including a range of architectural monographs. Some of Phaidon's output could be termed coffee table books, larger hardback books with high levels of production and photography. The Atlas of Brutalist Architecture is part of Phaidon's "architectural styles" series. The format of the Atlas of Brutalist Architecture follows that of the Atlas of Mid-Century Modern Houses, and several other Atlas of books, with similar article layout, book dimensions, page count and price tag; however the other Atlas of books are in full colour.

== Contents ==
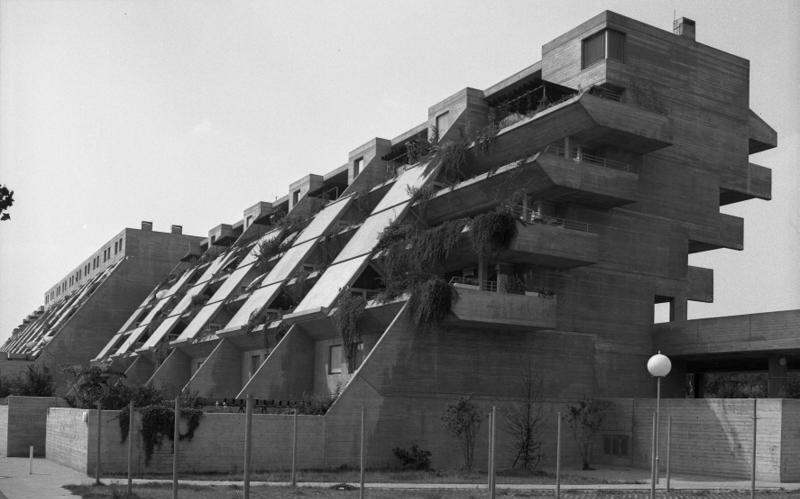
Tapachstrasse Housing Development, Stuttgart, by Peter Faller and Hermann Schröder, one of the book's images.

The publisher's description on the back cover includes: "This landmark survey documents more than 850 Brutalist building - existing and demolished, classic and contemporary - in the most wide-ranging investigation ever undertaken into one of architecture's most powerful styles." The book has eleven pages of introduction, including a synopsis of the brutalist building movement. At the end of the book is a 3 page glossary of terms and 16 pages of chronology, index and credits. Over 500 pages are devoted to the building profiles, with each page containing typically two building entries, plus black and white photographs. Some buildings, including the Sainte Marie de La Tourette convent by Le Corbusier near Lyon, São Paulo Museum of Art and the Yale Art and Architecture Building, get a double-page spread, with additional or larger photographs.

== Coverage ==
The book is divided into nine areas, with Europe having separate east and west sections. West Europe is the largest section with 356 entries, compared to 25 entries for the smallest area, Central America. The United States has 122 entries, the largest number for an individual country, followed by the United Kingdom and Germany, both with 72 entries.

The oldest building listed is the Hat Factory in Luckenwalde, Germany, dated 1923, some thirty years before the term Brutalism was first used. The two newest buildings, dated 2017, are De Krook library in Ghent, Belgium and the Second World War Museum in Gdańsk, Poland. 1970 is the year with the greatest number of entries.

The book includes 38 buildings which have been wholly or partially demolished, with a further 8 scheduled for demolition. It lists 12 buildings as derelict, a further 48 buildings are identified as being in a poor condition, with 770 considered well maintained. Separately counted, 792 buildings are in use, 43 buildings have been abandoned. 119 buildings are identified as being listed or protected, 37 of which are in the United Kingdom and 25 in Germany.

== Format ==
The book's physical size and weight reinforce its subject matter. It weighs 3.4 kg and has dimensions of 290 mm by 205 mm. The front and back covers are multi-textured (described as abrasive sandpaper by The New York Times) to give a three-dimensional perspective.

Phaidon has not indicated on their website that there is an online version, nor is one listed in WorldCat.

== Publication history and authorship ==
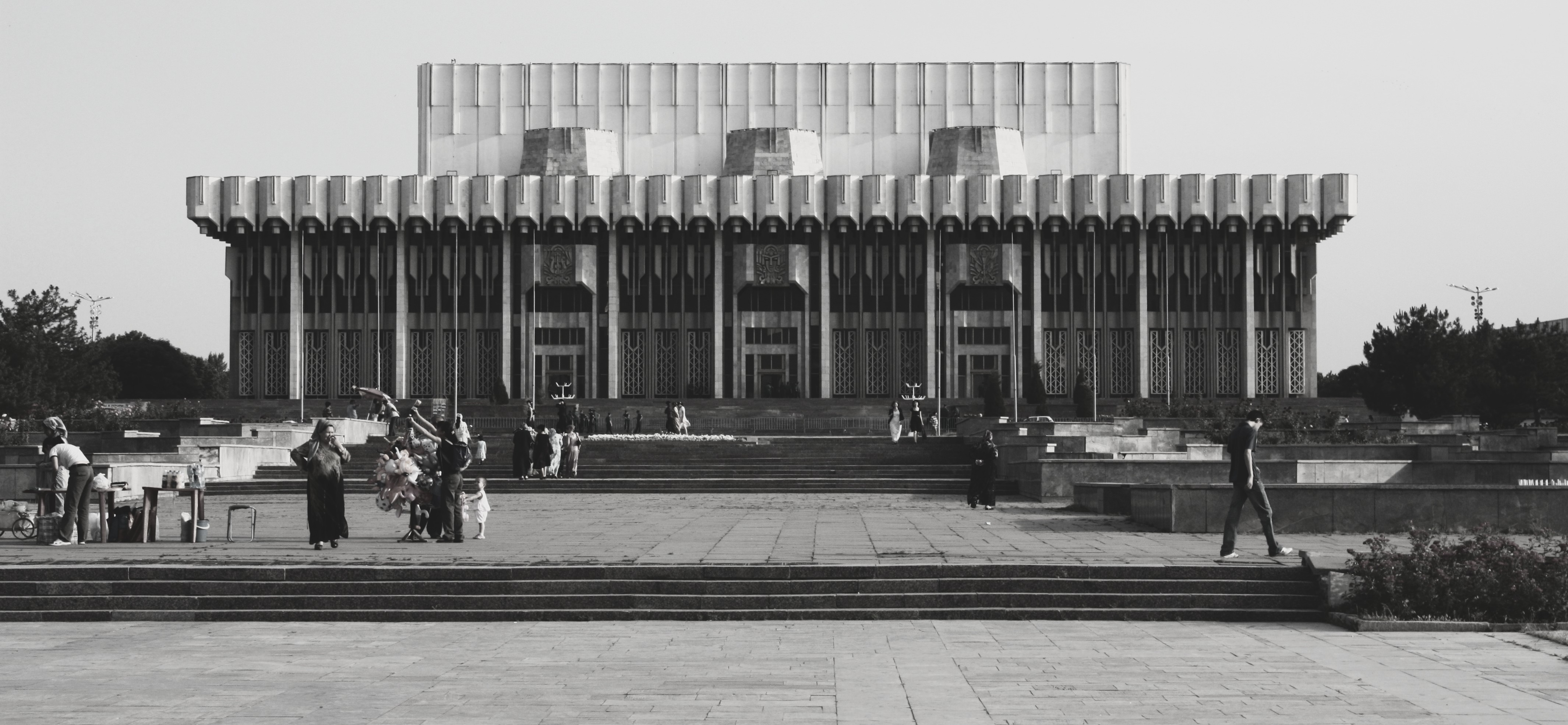
Peoples' Friendship Palace, Tashkent, one of the images credited to Wikipedia.

The first edition appeared with a gold and beige cover in 2018. This sold out quickly but rather than reprinting it, Phaidon elected to publish a second edition, with a red infill in the top left corner of the cover, stretching around to the rear cover. As of 2026 the book has been reprinted every year since 2020, with two reprints in 2021.

Virginia McLeod has been the editor throughout, the 2018 edition listed Clare Churly as project editor, whereas the 2020 version shows Emma Barton as project manager. The profiles are not individually attributed to an author, however the book credits Rebecca Roke, Rachel Giles, and Adam Štěch as the entry writers.

Eight photographs are credited to Wikipedia.

== Reception ==
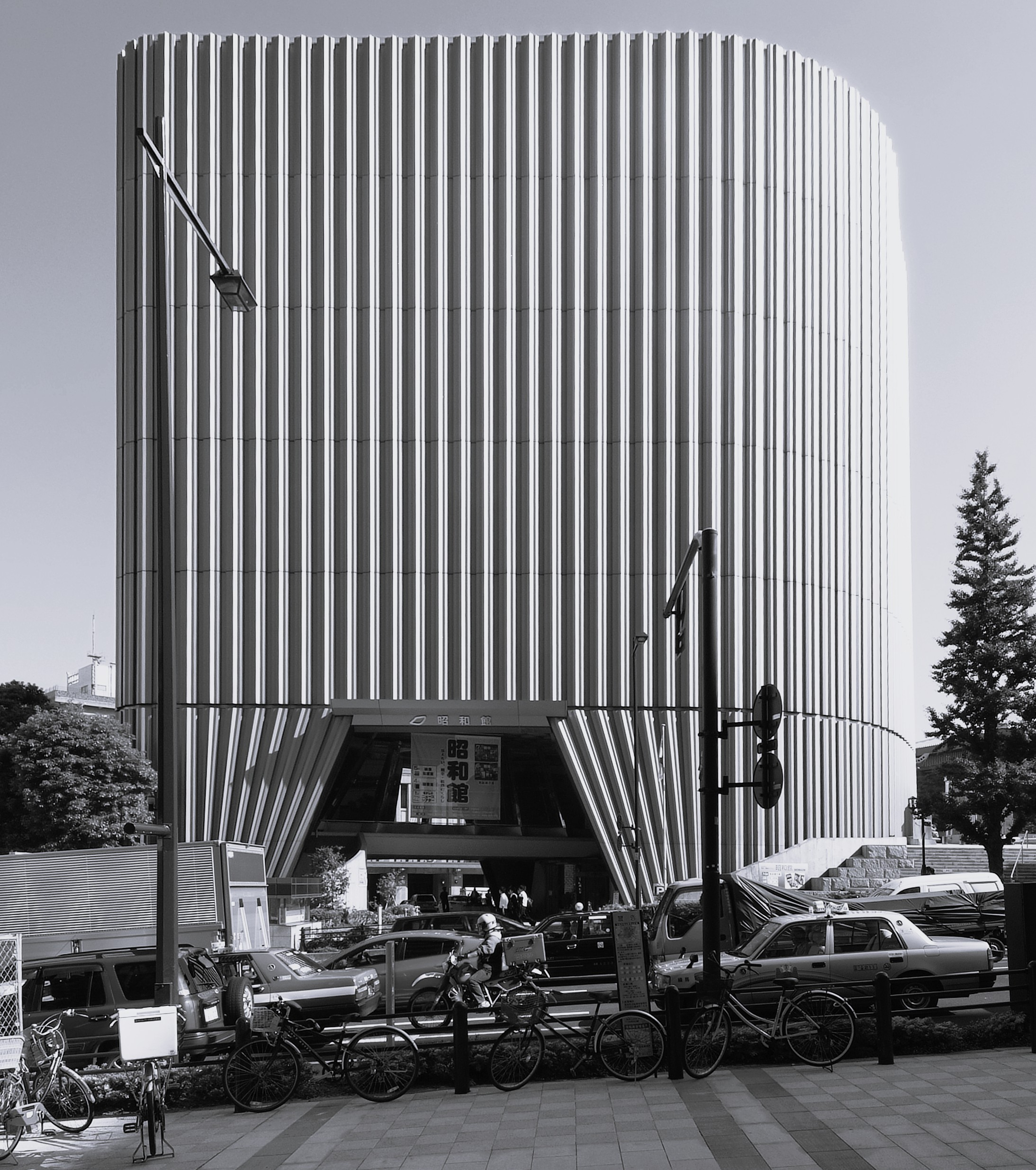
National Showa Memorial Museum, Tokyo, by Kiyonori Kikutake, one of the images credited to Wikipedia.

The atlas was included in the New York Times' selection of the best art books of 2018. Jason Farago welcomed its global scope, suggesting that newcomers would discover brutalism's worldwide reach into the final age of civic architectural ambition. "True believers can use it to prepare years of concrete-coated vacations." He admitted that Marcel Breuer's ski resort in Flaine in the French Alps may entice him into the latter category.

The review in the Los Angeles Times was more ambivalent. The architectural critic Mimi Zeiger started her article with: "If there was any lingering doubt that Brutalism — the architectural style derided for everything the name implies — was back in fashion, the Atlas of Brutalist Architecture quashes it with a monumental thump." But she was not entirely convinced by some of the entries: "For every building that clearly falls within canonical parameters, there's another that provoked me to yell a stream of "-isms" at the page: 'That's not Brutalism; it's Constructivism, Late Modernism, Metabolism …'". Nevertheless she recognised the global spread, and in particular how architects and structures from India and Brazil had prominence in the book.

Canadian Architect gave the book an unequivocally positive review, describing it as a kind of catalogue raisonné of brutalism. The reviewer considered it the most successful brutalism publication to date, valuing its comprehensive documentation of both well‑known and obscure buildings, including many that are at risk of demolition. The atlas was commended for reflecting brutalism's original ethos of architectural equality by giving each building a consistent level of treatment.
