= Ishibashi Kazunori =

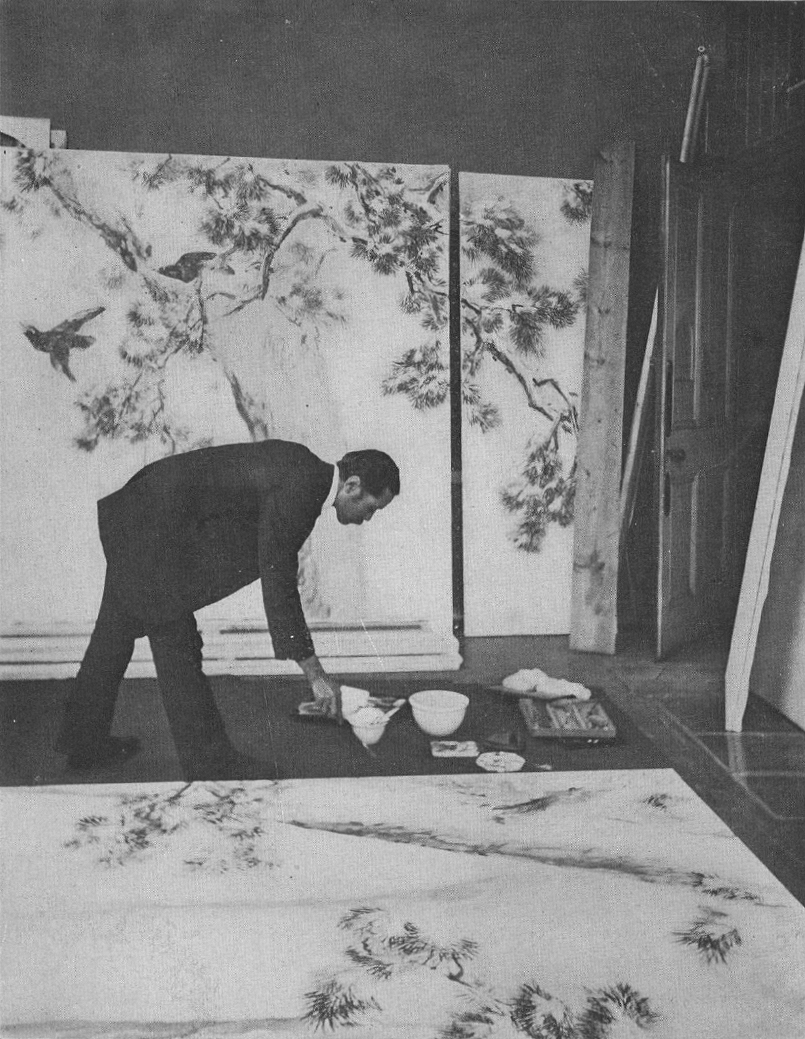
- Ishibashi Kazunori in his studio, with winter panels for The London Hospital
- Born: 6 June 1876; Shimane, Japan
- Died: 3 May 1928 (aged 51)
- Known for: Painting
- Movement: Yōga, Nihonga

Ishibashi Kazunori (石橋 和訓; 1876–1928) was a Japanese painter active in both yōga and nihonga. His name can also be read Ishibashi Wakun and he used the art name Gyūgagen.

Ishibashi is perhaps best known for Woman Reading Poetry which is currently on display at the Shimane Art Museum. Said to have been modelled after an English actress, the work is widely considered his masterpiece and has been designated as a Prefectural Cultural Property of Shimane.

== Life ==
Born in Shimane Prefecture in 1876, Ishibashi studied in Tokyo under Taki Katei, with whom he lived for five years. From 1903 he studied in London, initially at a private life drawing class before enrolling at the Royal Academy Schools. From May to November 1905, he travelled on the continent, to France, Italy, Budapest, Berlin, and the Netherlands. In 1907, he completed his studies at the Royal Academy. He contributed works to the Summer Exhibition thirteen times between 1908 and 1927 as well as to the Belgian section of the 1915 War Relief Exhibition. He also became a member of the Royal Society of Portrait Painters. While in England he submitted works to the Bunten exhibitions, winning several prizes.

In 1918, he returned to Japan, taking with him works by British and Belgian painters for "The Exhibition of European Famous Painters" at Mitsukoshi that summer; a letter addressed to him from the Belgian ambassador to Japan, Georges della Faille de Leverghem (nl), indicates this was a charity event in aid of displaced Belgians. In 1919 he was involved in discussions for Matsukata Kōjirō's unrealised Kyoraku Bijutsukan ("Sheer Pleasure Arts Pavilion") alongside Kuroda Seiki, whose diary records their meeting with Ōe Shintarō (大江新太郎), Bernard Leach, and Frank Brangwyn. While in Japan he joined the selection committee of the Teiten. In 1921 he travelled again to England, returning to Japan in 1924. Ishibashi died in 1928, his contribution to the Meiji Memorial Picture Gallery still incomplete.

== Works ==
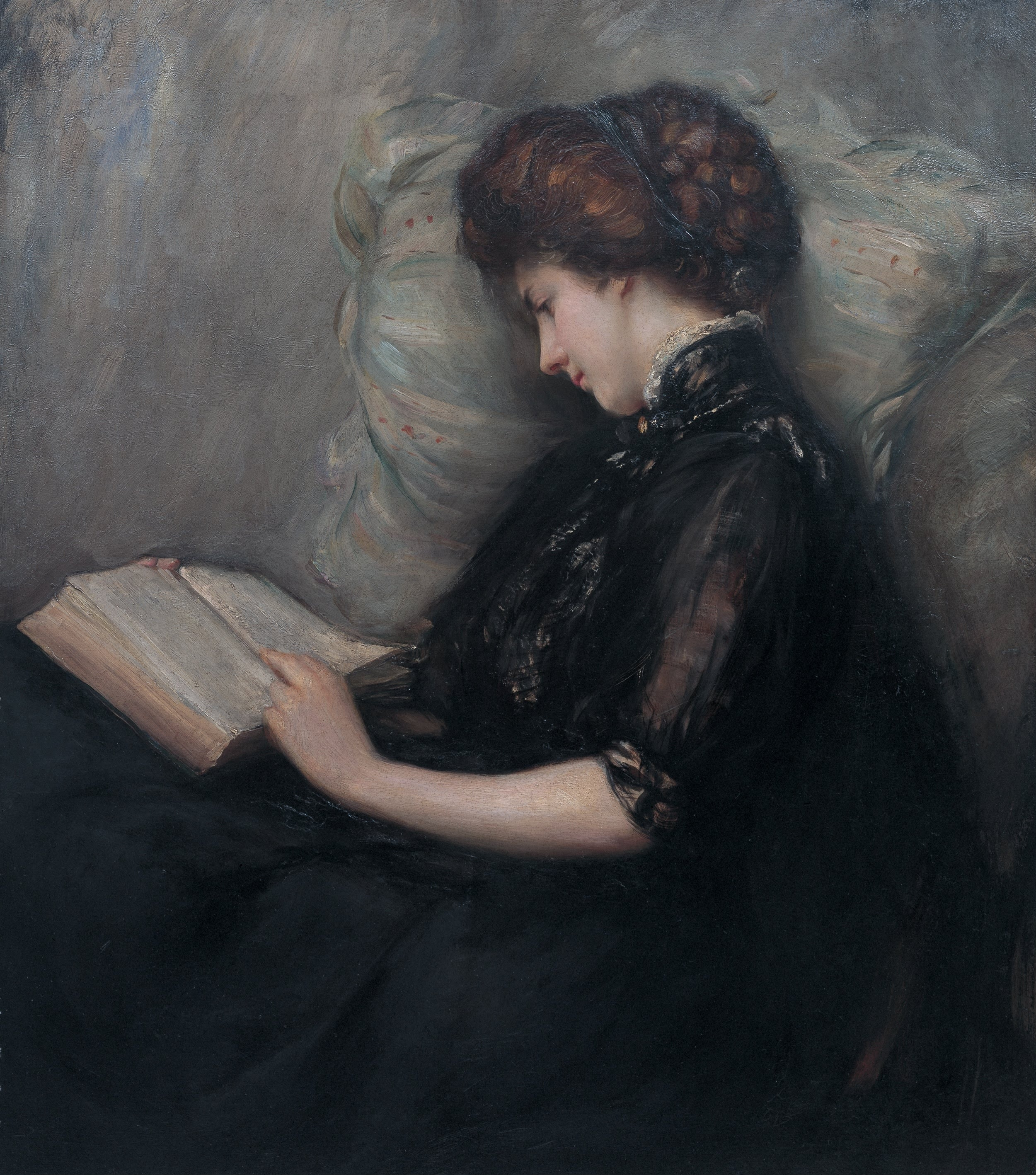
Lady Reading Poetry, 1906

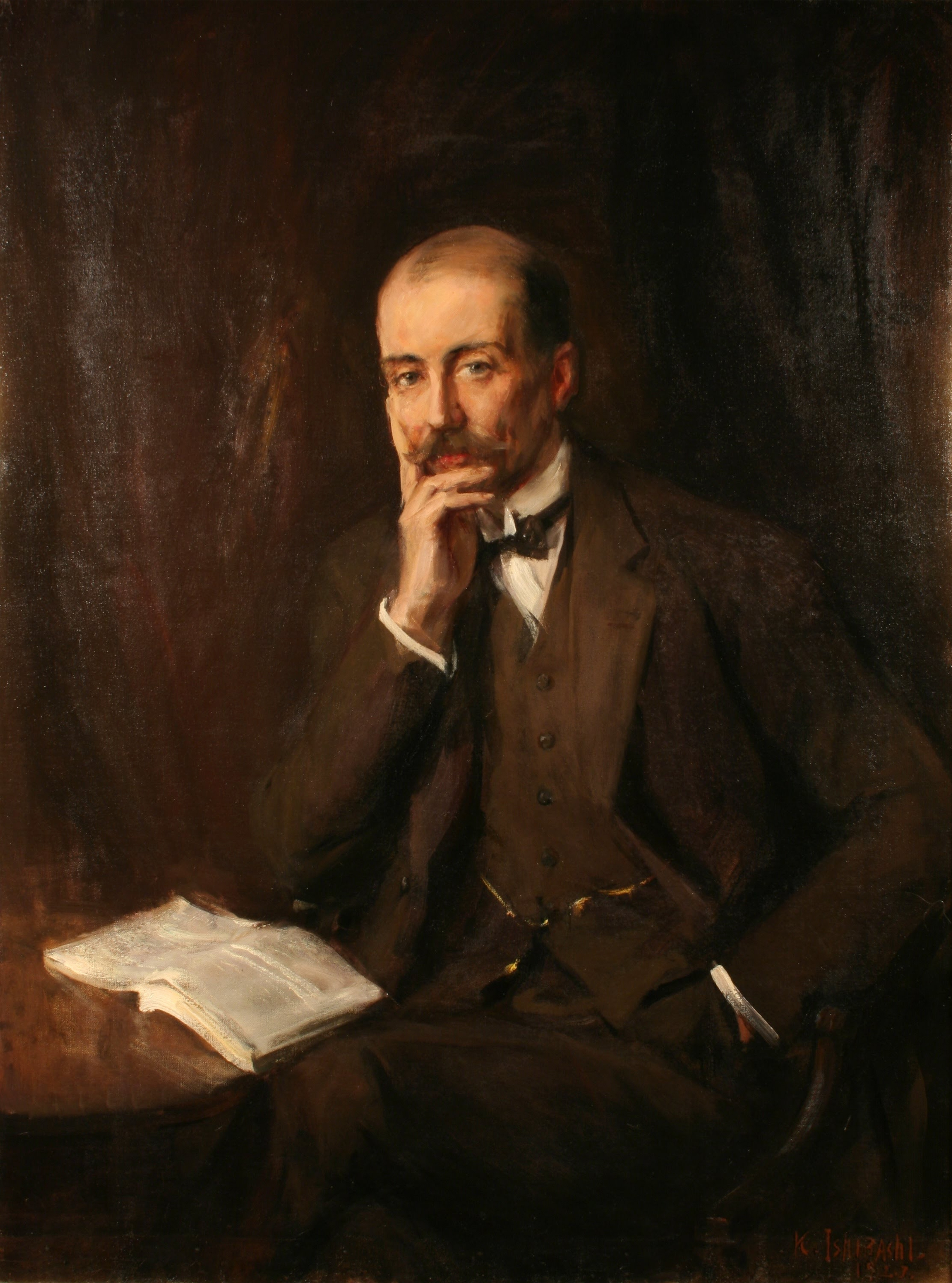
Sir Adrian Boult, 1923

Ishibashi Kazunori's works include a series of thirty-seven panels of the four seasons for the medical students' dining hall at the London Hospital (no longer extant); portraits of the statesmen Count Ōkuma (1915), Viscount Gotō Shinpei (1924), and Admiral Tōgō (1927), as well as of Sir Adrian Boult (1923), now at the Royal College of Music, along with Carp (1914), Sea-bream, and Japanese Winter Landscape, all shown at the Summer Exhibition. Several works are held in the British Museum.

Ishibashi displayed A Favourite Book and A Peaceful Evening for the 1915 War Relief Exhibition; and, at the Bunten exhibitions, Memories of Things, awarded third prize at the second in 1908, Lady Reading Poetry (1906), awarded third prize at the third in 1909, Doctor Uehara at the fifth in 1911, and Sculptor (1911), now at the National Museum of Modern Art, Tokyo, at the sixth the following year.

Lady Reading Poetry, now at the Shimane Art Museum, is said to have been modelled on an English actress and is generally considered his masterpiece. Both it and Old Lady (1919), now in a private collection in his birthplace of Izumo, have been designated Prefectural Cultural Properties of Shimane. In contrast to many of his contemporaries, his works show a "determination to keep distinct ... the two spheres of Western portraiture and Japanese decorative art".

== Gallery ==
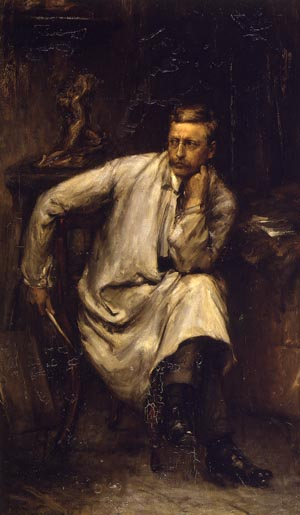
Sculptor, 1911

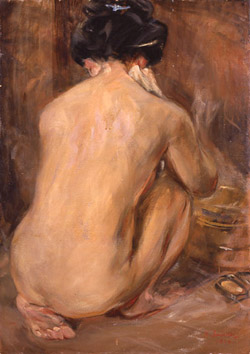
Study, 1924

== See also ==
- List of Cultural Properties of Japan – paintings (Shimane)
