= Kakuzora Tatehata =

Japanese sculptor

Kakuzora Tatehata (Japanese: 建畠覚造 Hepburn: Tatehata Kakuzora, April 22, 1919 – February 16, 2006) was a Japanese sculptor. He was a leading figure in promoting abstract sculptures in Japan after the Second World War. He incorporated bronze and all kinds of materials such as iron, aluminum, plastic, acrylic, cement, etc. In the 1980s he started to work with plywood.

== Biography ==
Tatehata was born in Shiroyama, Wakayama (now Aridagawa) on 22 April 1919. He was the eldest son of sculptor Taimu Tatebashi. He graduated from the Tokyo Art School (now Tokyo University of the Arts) sculpture major in 1941, exhibited at Nitten and received a special recognition.

He was interested in the relationship between the entities that compose the sculpture and the space that does not take advantage of it. He shifted from academic concrete sculpture to avant-garde abstract sculpture. In 1950 he was influenced by a sculpture with a hole in the body by the abstract sculptor Henry Moore, and in 1950 he formed a sculpture department in the Association of Movement Art.

From 1953 to 1955 he studied in France, participating in many exhibitions such as the Salon de Mai. After returning home, he made geometric shapes combining metal and other materials and became active as one of the pioneers of Japanese abstract sculpture in the 1950s.

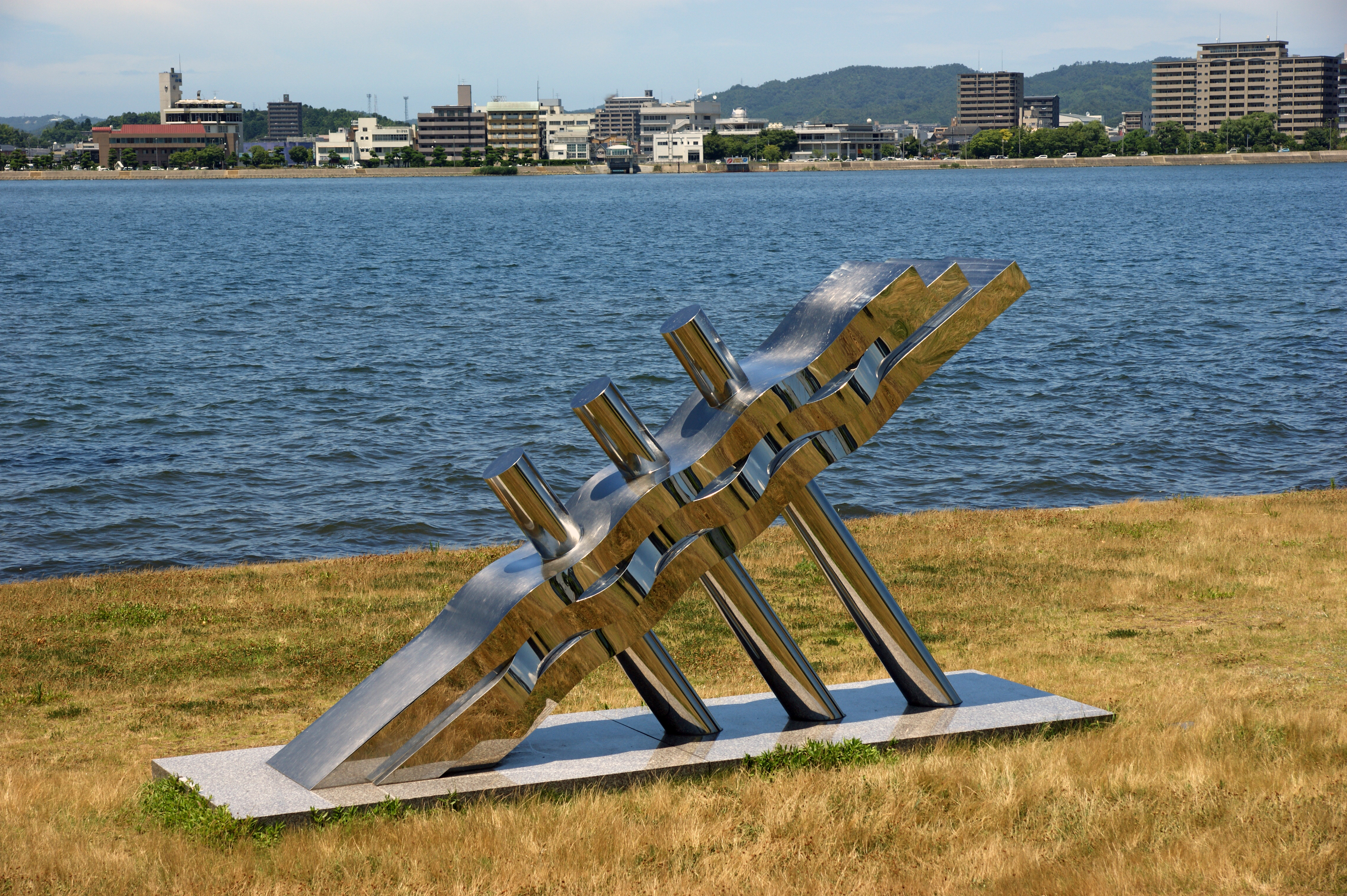
WAVING FIGURE (1998, Shimane Art Museum)

Since 1959 he has taught sculpture as a professor at Tama Art University and has received numerous awards such as the Kotaro Takamura Prize, the Nyujiro Nakahara Award, the Nagano City Outdoor Sculpture Award, the Henry Moore Grand Prize Exceptional Award, and the Minister of Education award. In 2005 he was honored as a Person of Cultural Merit. Monuments and public arts were set up in plazas and schools in various places in his honor.

His eldest son, Tanaka Takahata is also a sculptor and professor of art at the Nihon University College of Art. His second son Akira Tatehata is a poet, art critic, former director of the National Museum of Art, Osaka, and the principal of Kyoto City University of Arts.

On 16 February 2006, he died of heart failure at the age of 86.
