= Shoun =

Shoun may refer to:

- Anna Shoun, a character in the British television series Star Cops
- Clyde Shoun (1912-1968), a professional baseball player
- John Shoun the blessed (died 1619)
- Prince Shōun, a Japanese prince and Buddhist priest
- Yamamoto Shōun (1870-1965), a Japanese artist
