= Hotel Sofitel Tokyo =

Former highrise hotel in Tokyo, Japan

Coordinates: 35.7125°N 139.768056°E

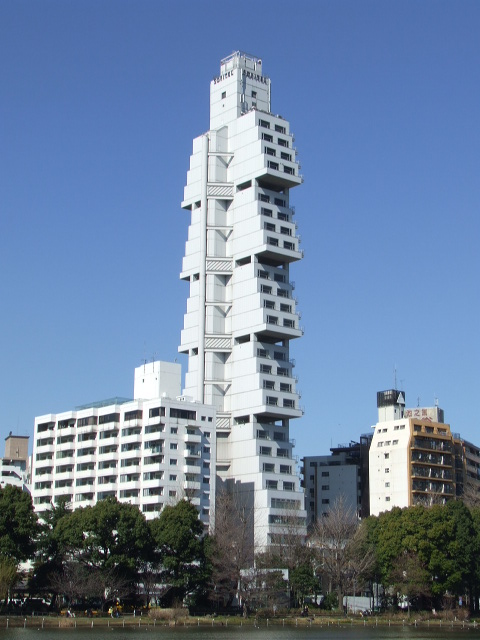
Hotel Sofitel, Tokyo, 1994

Hotel Sofitel Tokyo (ホテルソフィテル東京) was a hotel high-rise building (106.07 m, 3 underground storeys) in Taito-ku, Tokyo (1-48, 2 Ikenohata, Taito-ku, Tokyo, Japan). It was established in 1994 as Hotel Cosima with 71 rooms on 26 cantilever floors. In 1999 it was purchased by Accor Group. After a brief refurbishment (with the number of rooms increased to 83) it was reopened as 4-star hotel in September 2000, but was soon closed in December 2006 and was demolished between February 2007 and May 2008.

Hotel Sofitel was a late work of Japanese architect Kiyonori Kikutake (then 66 years old when the building was conceived), best known for his own pre-metabolist house (Sky House) and the Edo-Tokyo Museum (1993). The Hotel Sofitel building resembled some metabolist ideas (as Joint Core, capsules, modularity and the theoretical possibility of replacement of its parts). The building shows a direct similarity to Kikutake's earlier theoretical project "Tree-shaped Community" from 1968. However, this project consisted of a group of towers cross-shaped in the plan, and also shows a similarity to other metabolists projects such as the Nakagin Capsule Tower by Kisho Kurokawa and the Shizuoka Press and Broadcasting Tower by Kenzo Tange.

It is said that the characteristic shape of the hotel building was inspired by the shapes of Japanese temples and pine trees. Despite some metabolist-like features the building itself cannot be seen as representative of the metabolist movement as it was designed long after the slow breakup of the metabolist groups in the late 1970s. The object referenced traditional Japanese architecture, which is characteristic of Kikutake's mature and late works (such as the Edo-Tokyo Museum, Izumo Grand Shrine Administration Building and the Toukouen Hotel).

== Bibliography ==
- Kisho Kurokawa, "The Origin and History of the Metabolist Movement" - Charles Jencks, Kisho Kurokawa. Studio Vista, 1976
- Botond Bognar, "Beyond the Bubble: Contemporary Japanese Architecture"; Phaidon, 2008
- Kurt Helfrich, William Whitaker, "Crafting a Modern World: The Architecture and Design of Antonin and Noémi Raymond"; Princeton Architectural Press, 2006
- Mark Mulligan "Kiyonori Kikutake Structuring the Future" Kiyonori Kikutake: Structuring the Future
