= Sesshū Memorial Museum =

Museum in Masuda, Shimane Prefecture, Japan

- 益田市立雪舟の郷記念館
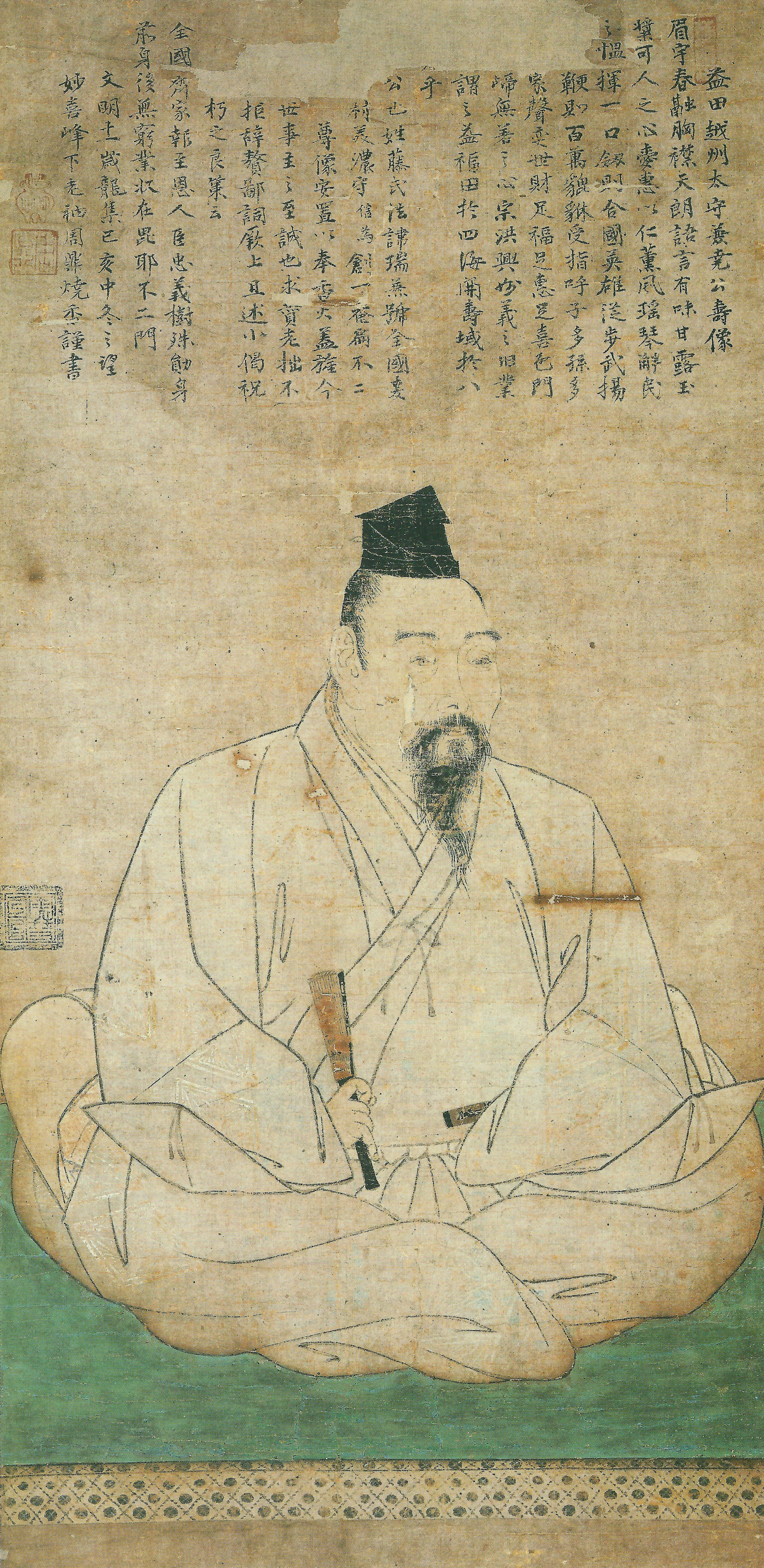
- Portrait of Masuda Kanetaka by Sesshū (ICP)
- Interactive map of the Sesshū Memorial Museum area

General information
- Location: 1149 Otoyoshi-chō, Masuda, Shimane Prefecture, Japan
- Coordinates: 34°41′06″N 131°50′51″E
- Opened: October 1990

Website
- Official website

Sesshū Memorial Museum (益田市立雪舟の郷記念館, Masuda Shiritsu Sesshū no Sato Kinenkan) opened in Masuda, Shimane Prefecture, Japan, in 1990. Located next to the site of the Daiki-an (大喜庵), said to have been the site of Sesshū's death and burial, the museum stages exhibitions relating to the artist and to the history of Masuda. The collection includes one Important Cultural Property, Sesshū's 1479 portrait of Masuda Kanetaka (益田兼堯); two Prefectural Cultural Properties, Yasutomi Family Documents (安富家文書) and Sufu Family Documents (周布家文書); and seven Municipal Cultural Properties, three scrolls with flowers and birds attributed to Sesshū, a pair of landscape byōbu by Unkoku Tōeki (雲谷等益), Daruma, Ikuzanshu, and Seiōgyū by the same painter, sailing boats in an autumn bay and travel through snow-covered mountains by the same artist, lotus and heron by Saitō Tōshitsu (斎藤等室筆), Daruma by Unkoku Tōoku (雲谷等屋), and Yoshida Family Documents (吉田家文書).

== See also ==
- List of Cultural Properties of Japan - paintings (Shimane)
- List of Historic Sites of Japan (Shimane)
- List of Museums in Shimane Prefecture
