= Taki Katei =

Japanese painter

Taki Katei (瀧和亭)
- Born: 27 January 1830; Edo (Tokyo), Japan
- Died: 28 September 1901 (aged 71)

Taki Katei (瀧和亭 Katei Taki 27 January 1830 – 28 September 1901) was a Japanese painter working during the late Tokugawa period and Meiji era. He is an important figure as his career bridges the two eras and his work demonstrates some of the shifts occurring in artistic practice as Japanese society changed and expectations altered.

In 2019 World Museum in Liverpool staged the first-ever exhibition of Taki Katei's work outside Japan.

== Biography ==
Katei was born in the Sendagaya district of Edo (now Tokyo). His father was a masterless samurai (rōnin) who had moved from Aki Province to the shogun's city. Katei began studying painting when he was about seven years old, initially with the painter Satō Suigai and subsequently with Suigai's own teacher, Ōoka Unpō. With him, Katei learnt the techniques of bird-and-flower painting, including sketching from life (shasei). In 1851 he made the journey to Nagasaki, where he studied with the painter Hidaka Tetsuō for six months and became acquainted with Chinese artists.

Katei returned to Edo in 1854 and worked briefly for the shogunate, but in 1856 he left for Fujioka, Gunma, and from there continued north, to Echigo Province. For the next ten years he made his living travelling between Niigata, Sado Island, Sakata and Hakodate, fulfilling commissions for private patrons. Katei returned to Edo in 1866 but due to the disruptions surrounding the Meiji Restoration of 1868, he travelled for a while to Noda, where he found a number of patrons who continued to support him in later years.

During the 1870s and early 1880s, Katei had a wide circle of friends and acquaintances in the Tokyo literati community, and his contributions to collaborative works are numerous. However, as the times and the nature of art venues changed, Katei submitted works to the Domestic Industrial Expositions (1877, 1881 and 1890) and Competitive Painting Exhibitions (1882 and 1884), and was a central member of the Japan Art Association (Nihon Bijutsu Kyōkai), founded in 1888. He also sent works to the international expositions in Vienna (1873), Philadelphia (1876), Chicago (1893), and Paris (1900). From 1881 onwards he produced numerous works for the imperial household; he was the highest-paid painter in the scheme to decorate the new imperial palace, completed in 1888, and in 1893 was appointed an Imperial Household Artist. He taught a large number of pupils, among the most important of whom were Ishibashi Kazunori, Satō Shien, and Yamamoto Shōun.

== Style and content ==
In terms of style, Katei's work sits within the broad lineage of bird-and-flower painting associated with Tani Buncho and Tsubaki Chinzan. His output consisted of both monochrome ink paintings and richly coloured works in opaque pigments. He possessed a repertoire of auspicious imagery and themes derived from Chinese culture that were popular during his day. In his earlier decades he produced an equal number of landscape compositions to those depicting birds and flowers, as well as some portrait paintings, but in his final decade he concentrated on producing densely coloured paintings (saimitsuga) of birds and flowers on a large scale for both exhibitions and imperial commissions.

Katei's student, Ishibashi Kazunori, took a large group of drawings from the studio with him to Britain in 1904, which he sold to the Liverpool businessman, Cedric Boult and his wife, Katharine, in 1913. The couple's son, Sir Adrian Boult, donated these in 1956 to National Museums Liverpool, and some were transferred to the Royal Ontario Museum and the National Museum of Scotland.

== Works ==
=== Paintings ===
- Gathering at the Orchid Pavilion, painting, ink and colours on silk, 1872. British Museum
- Orchids, painting, ink and colours on silk, 1874. Tokyo National Museum
- Egrets, painting, ink and colours on silk, 1892. British Museum
- Peafowl, painting, ink and colours on silk, 1892. Tokyo National Museum
- Plum, Pine Tree, and Bamboo, set of three paintings, ink and colours on silk, 1900. Indianapolis Museum of Art
- Lotus and Bamboo, pair of paintings, ink and colours on silk, ca. 1900. National Museum of Scotland

=== Books ===
- Kōkōkan gayō, woodblock-printed book, 1884.
- Tansei ippan, woodblock-printed book, 1894.
