= Kiyonori Kikutake =

Japanese architect

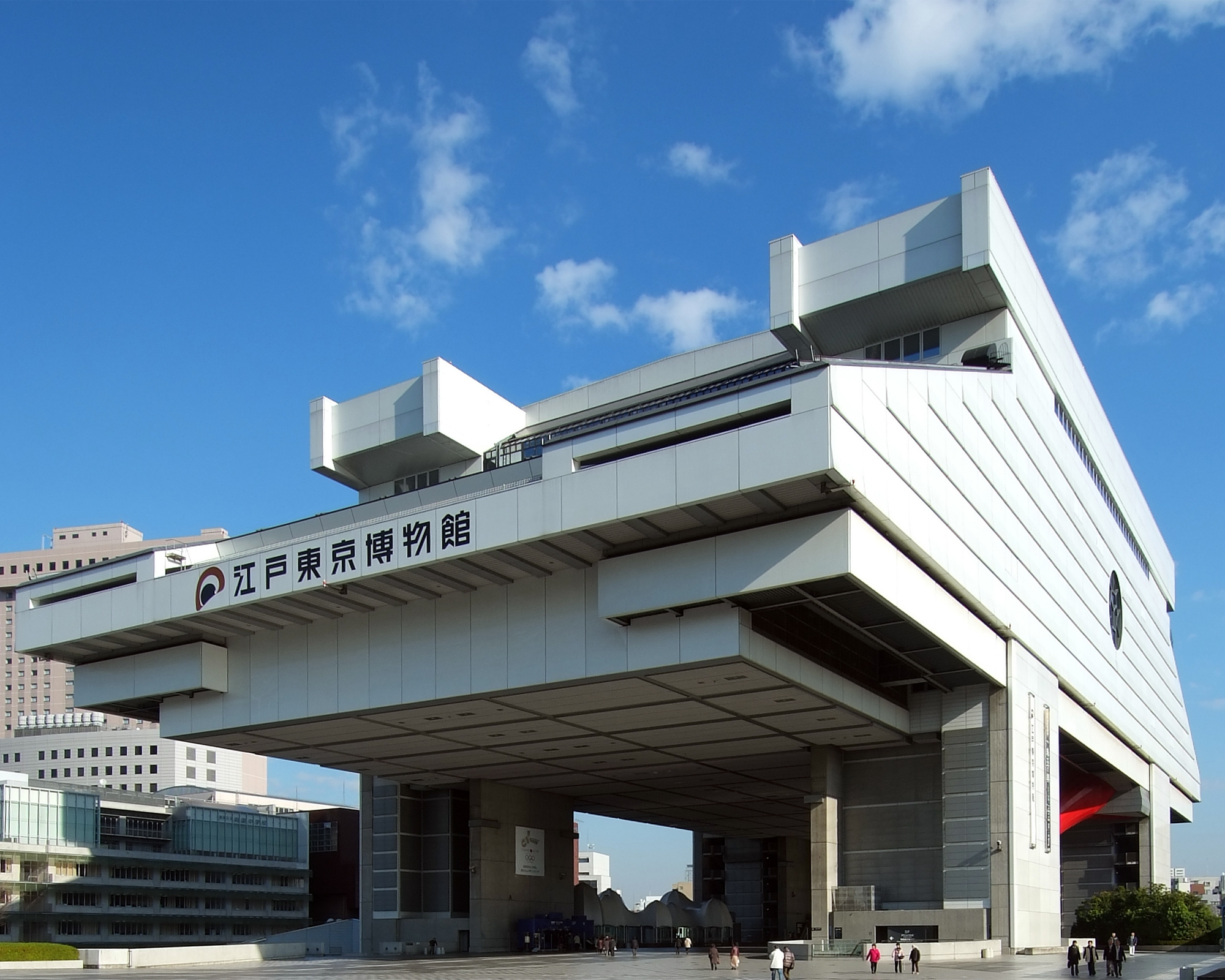
Edo-Tokyo Museum, designed by Kiyonori Kikutake

Kiyonori Kikutake (菊竹 清訓, Kikutake Kiyonori) (April 1, 1928 – December 26, 2011) was a prominent Japanese architect known as one of the founders of the Japanese Metabolist group. He was also the tutor and employer of several important Japanese architects, such as Toyo Ito, Shōzō Uchii and Itsuko Hasegawa.

== Background ==
Kikutake was born in 1928 in Kurume, Japan and graduated from Waseda University in 1950.

== Career ==
Kikutake is best known for his "Marine City" project of 1958, which formed part of the Metabolist Manifesto launched at the World Design Conference in Tokyo in 1960 under the leadership of Kenzo Tange. He, along with fellow member Kisho Kurokawa was invited to exhibit work at the "Visionary Architecture" exhibition in New York of 1961, through which the Metabolists gained international recognition. Kikutake continued his practice until his death in 2011, producing several key public buildings throughout Japan, as well as lecturing internationally. He was also the President and then Honorary President of the Japan Institute of Architects. Kikutake often collaborated with the prominent Japanese structural engineer Gengo Matsui. Starting from the early 1950s, they worked together on the design of more than 40 buildings, including on well-known projects like the Sky House, Hotel Tōkōen, Toku’un-ji Temple Ossuary, and the Hagi Civic Hall.

== Awards ==
Kikutake was the recipient of numerous awards both in his native Japan and internationally. These include the Japan Academy of Architecture Prize (1970) and the UIA (Union Internationale des Architectes) Auguste Perret Prize (1978).

== List of works ==
- Sky House, Tokyo, 1958
- Marine City (proposal), 1958
- Shimane Prefectural Government Third Annex, 1958
- Prefectural Museum Shimane, 1960
- Tatebayashi Civic Centre, Gumma, 1963
- Administrative building of Izumo Shrine, Shimane, 1963
- Tokouen Resort, 1964
- Pacific Hotel Chigasaki, Kanagawa, 1966
- Miyakonojo Civic Hall, Miyazaki, 1966
- Shimane Prefectural Library, 1968
- Kurume Civic Center, 1969; demolished 2017
- Expo Tower, Expo '70, Osaka, 1969
- Pasadena Heights, 1975
- Matsumi Tower, Ibaraki, 1976
- Tanabe Art Museum, Shimane, 1979
- Hotel AreaOne Sakaiminato Marina, 1985
- Hotel Seiyo Ginza, Tokyo, 1987
- Fukuoka City Hall, 1988
- Edo-Tokyo Museum, Tokyo, 1993
- Hotel Sofitel Tokyo, Tokyo, 1994
- Kitaya Inari Shrine, Tokyo, 1997
- Shimane Art Museum, Shimane, 1999
- National Showa Memorial Museum, Tokyo, 1999
- Kyushu National Museum, Fukuoka, 2005
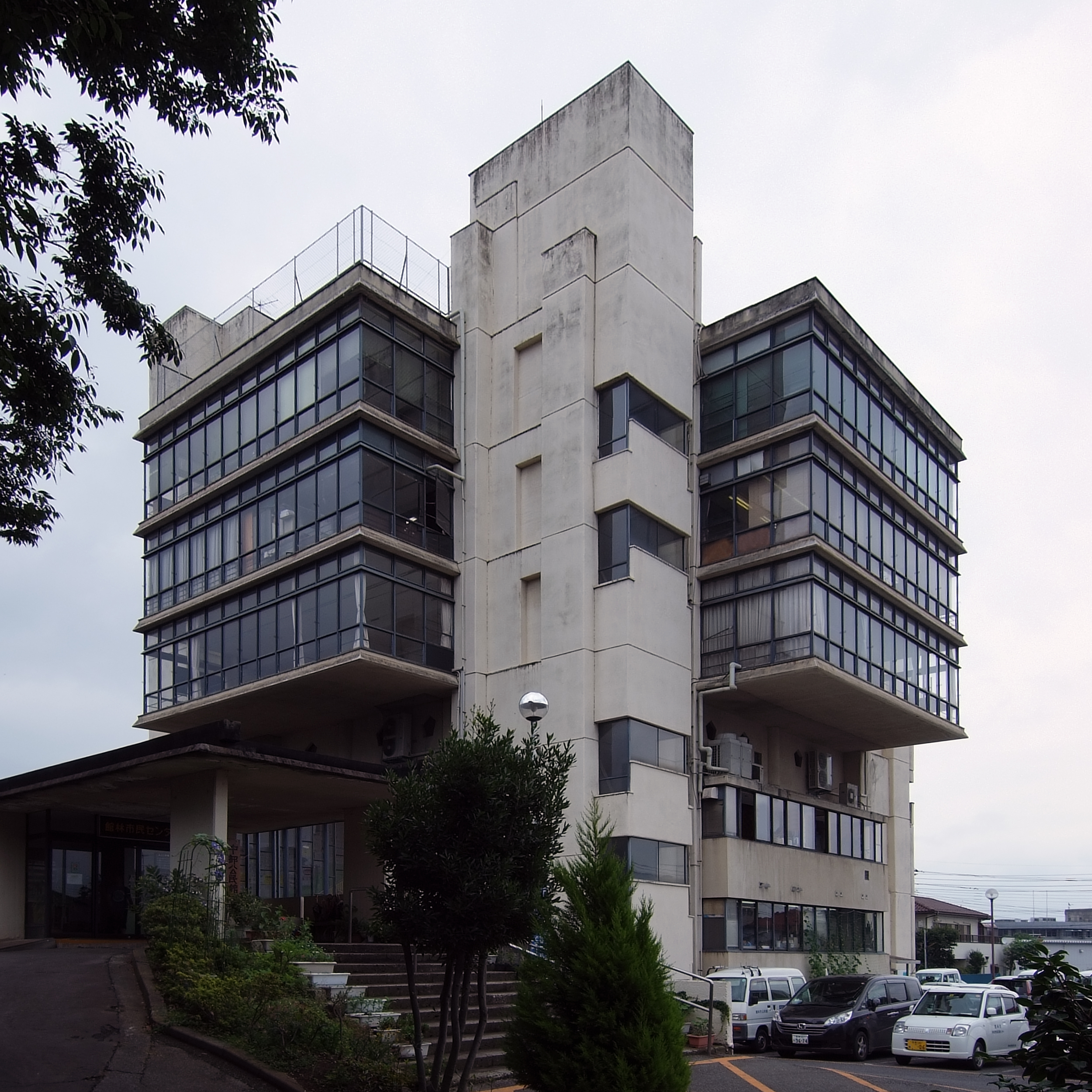
Tatebayashi Civic Centre, 1963

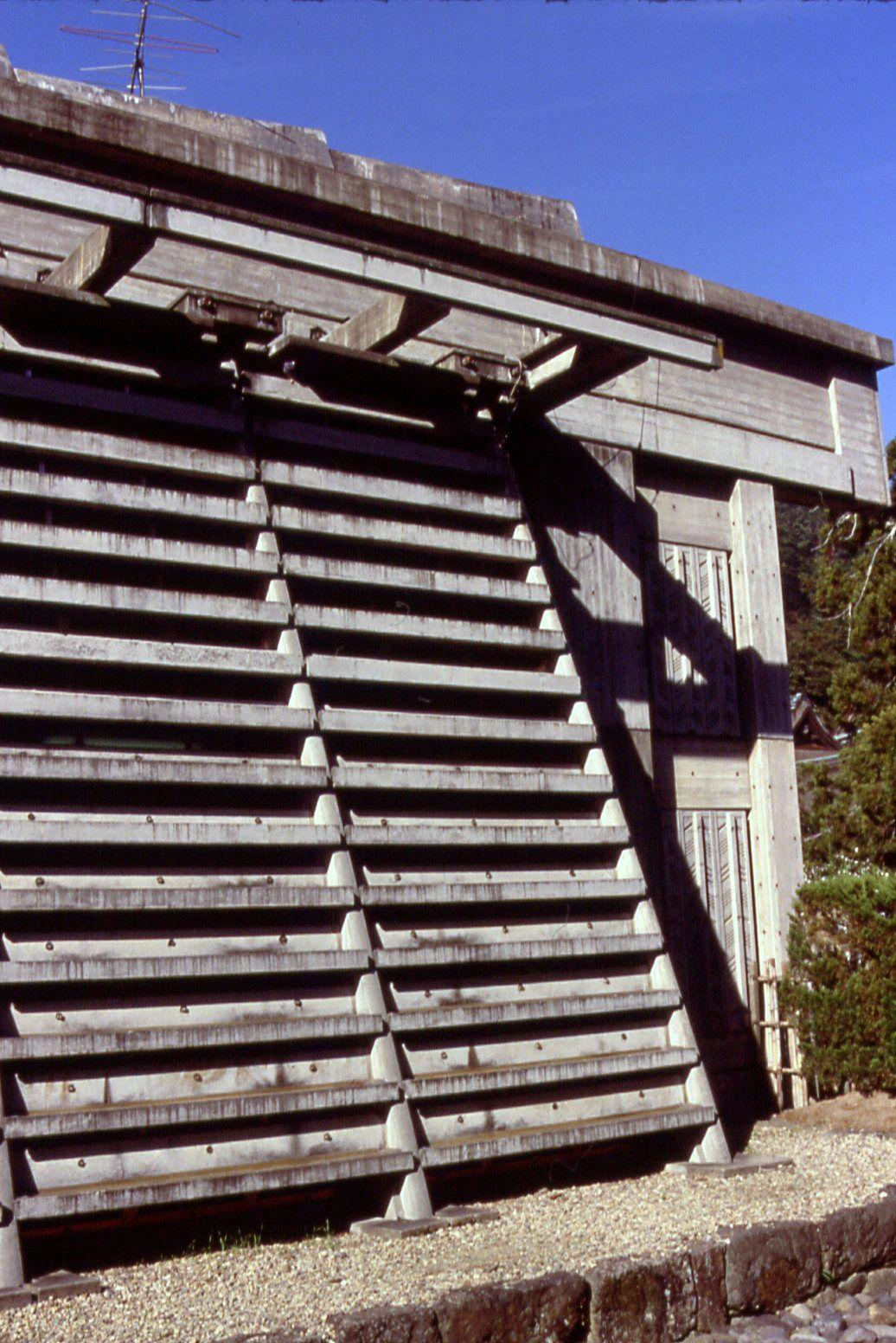
Administrative building of Izumo Shrine, 1963

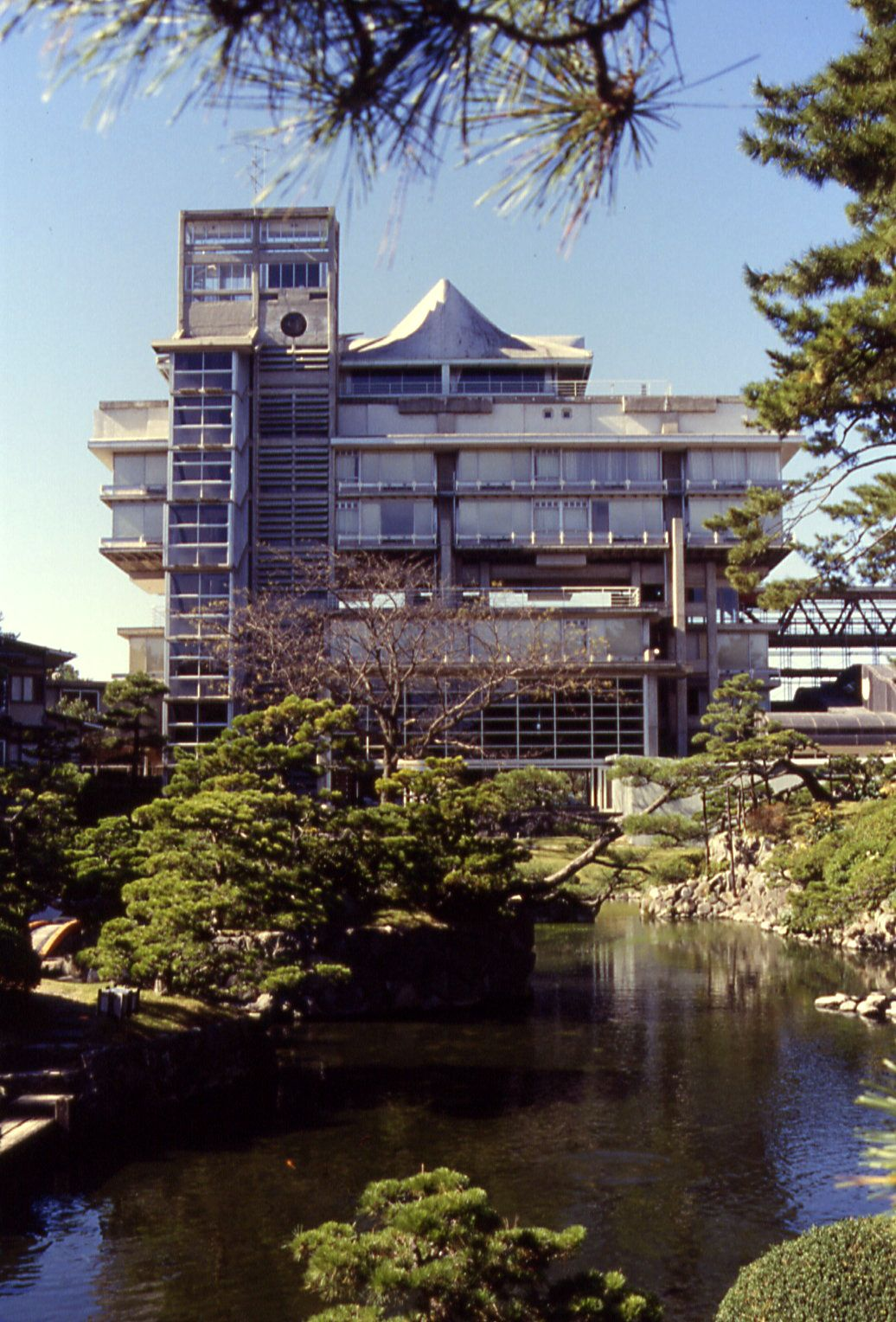
Hotel Tokoen, 1964

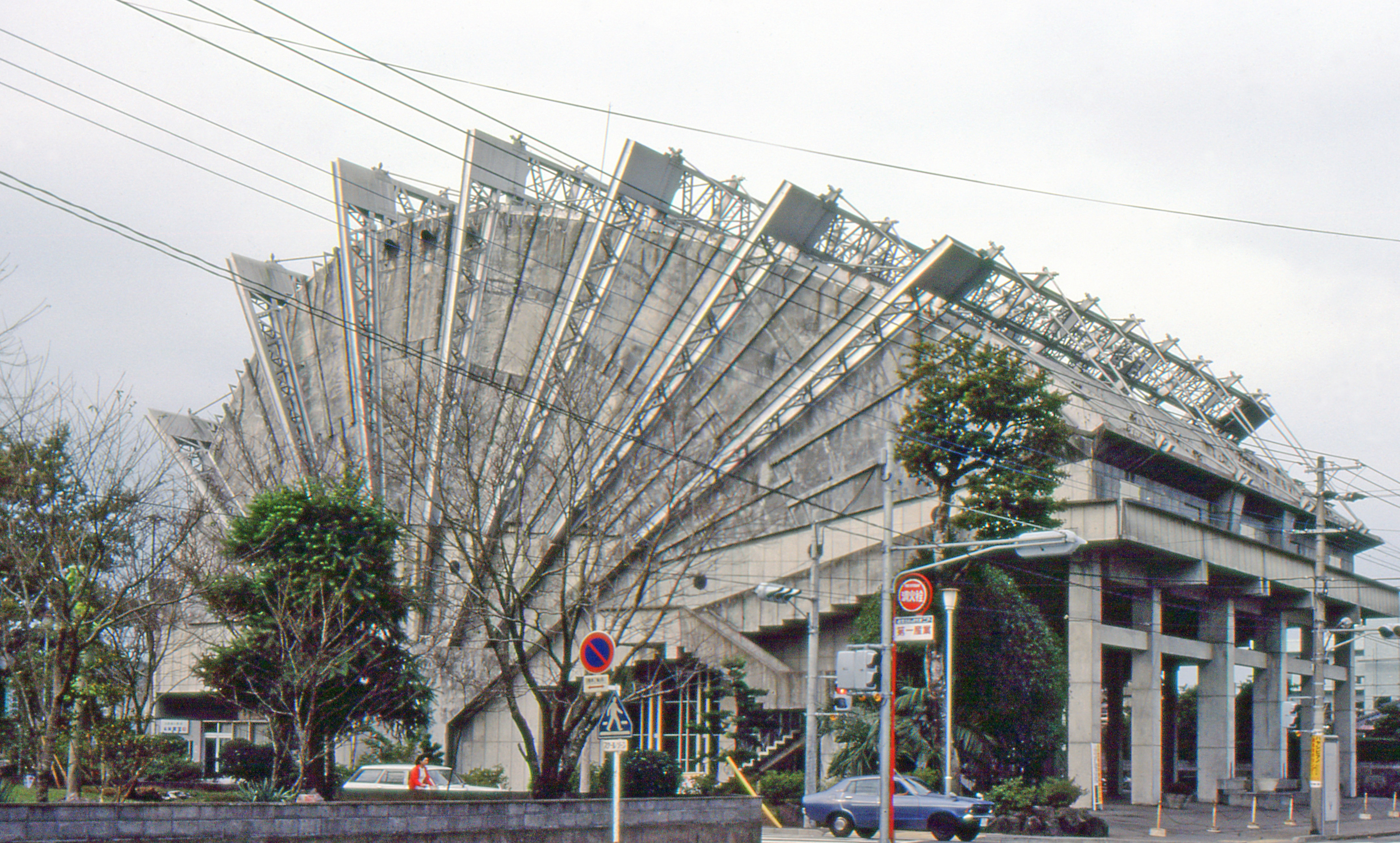
Miyakonojo Civic Hall, 1966

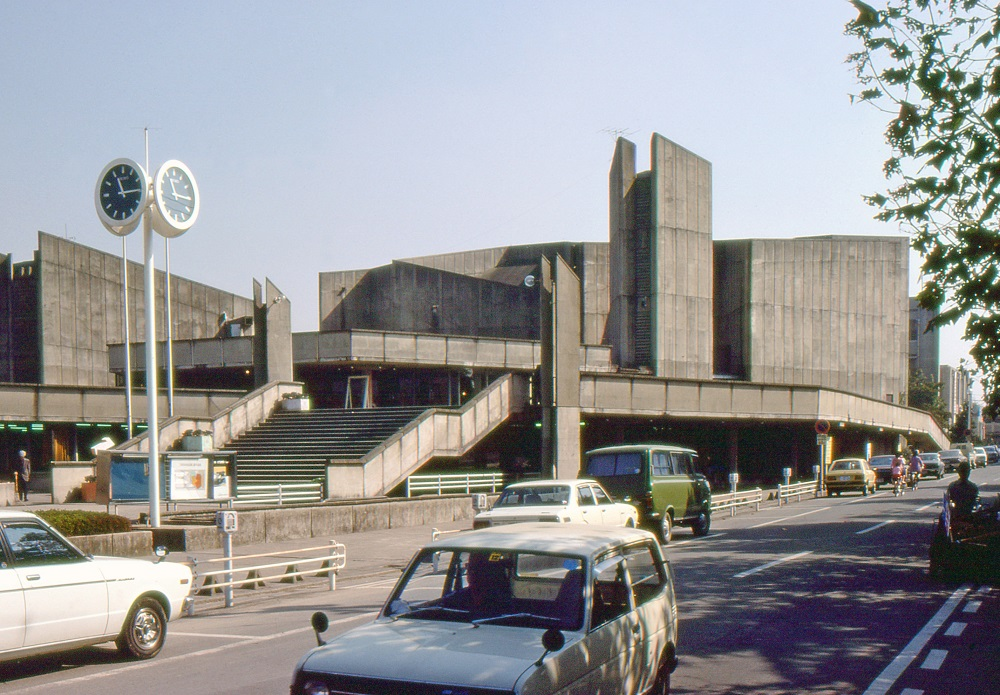
Kurume Civic Center, 1969

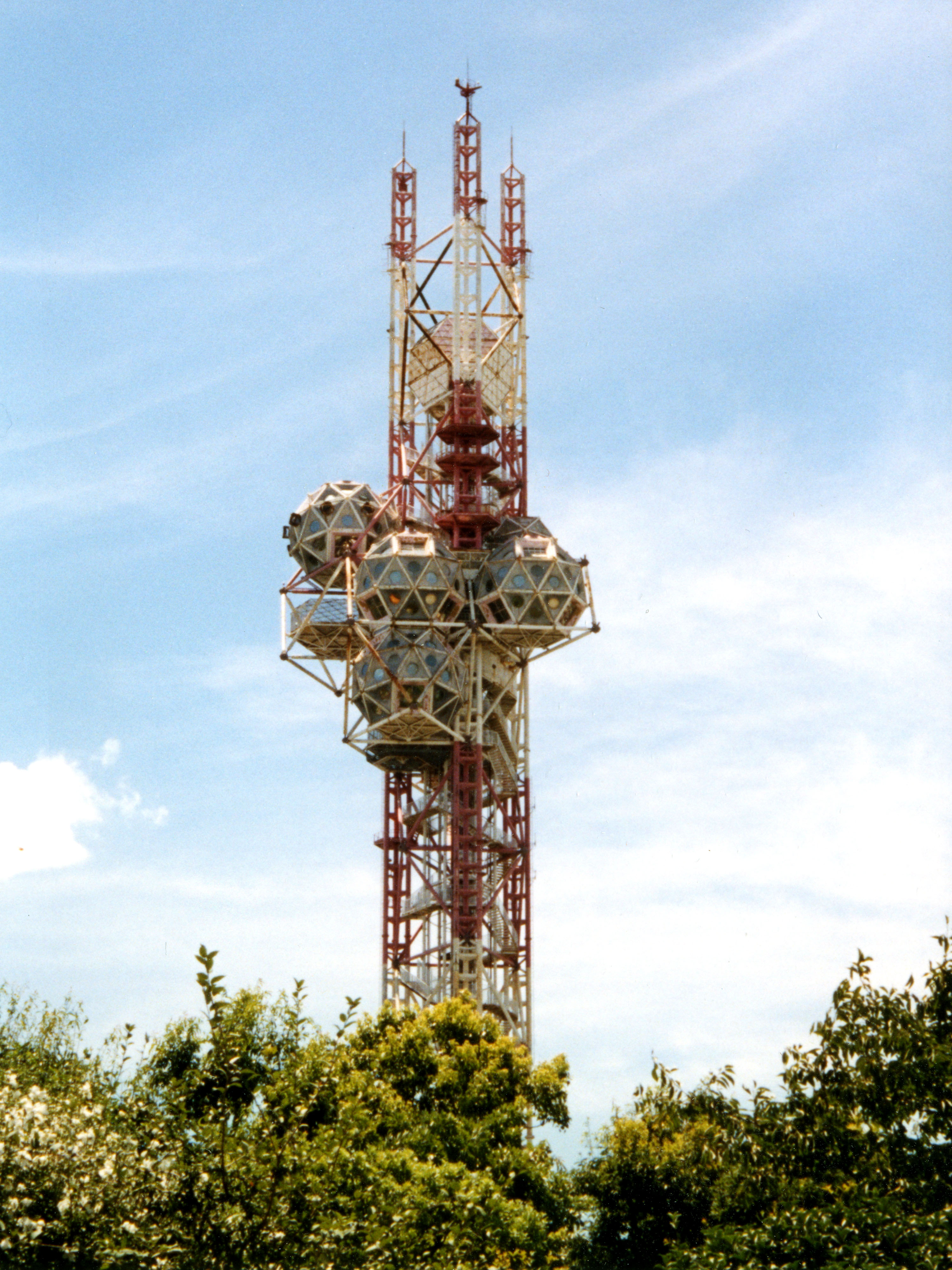
Osaka Expo Tower, 1970

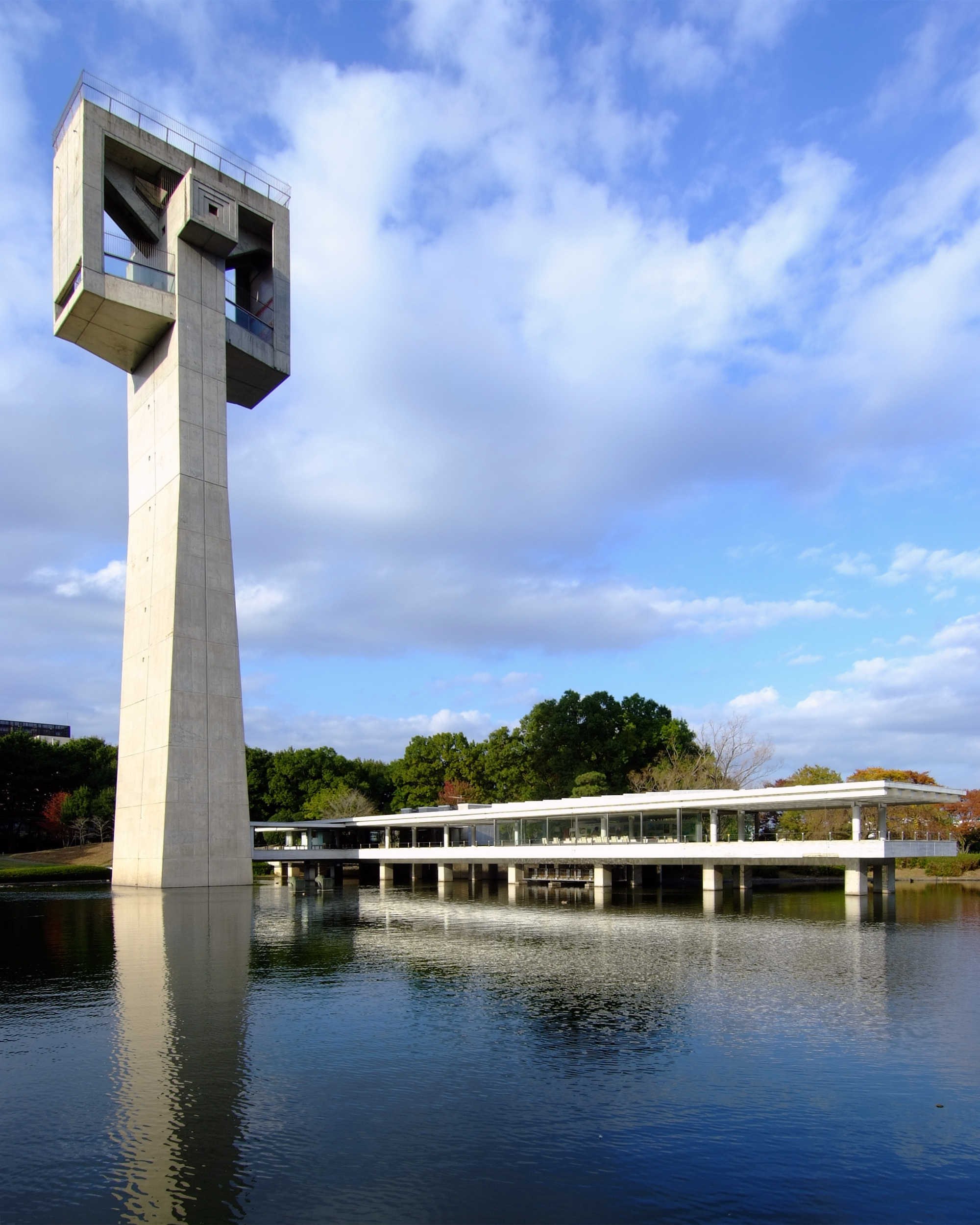
Matsumi Tower, 1976

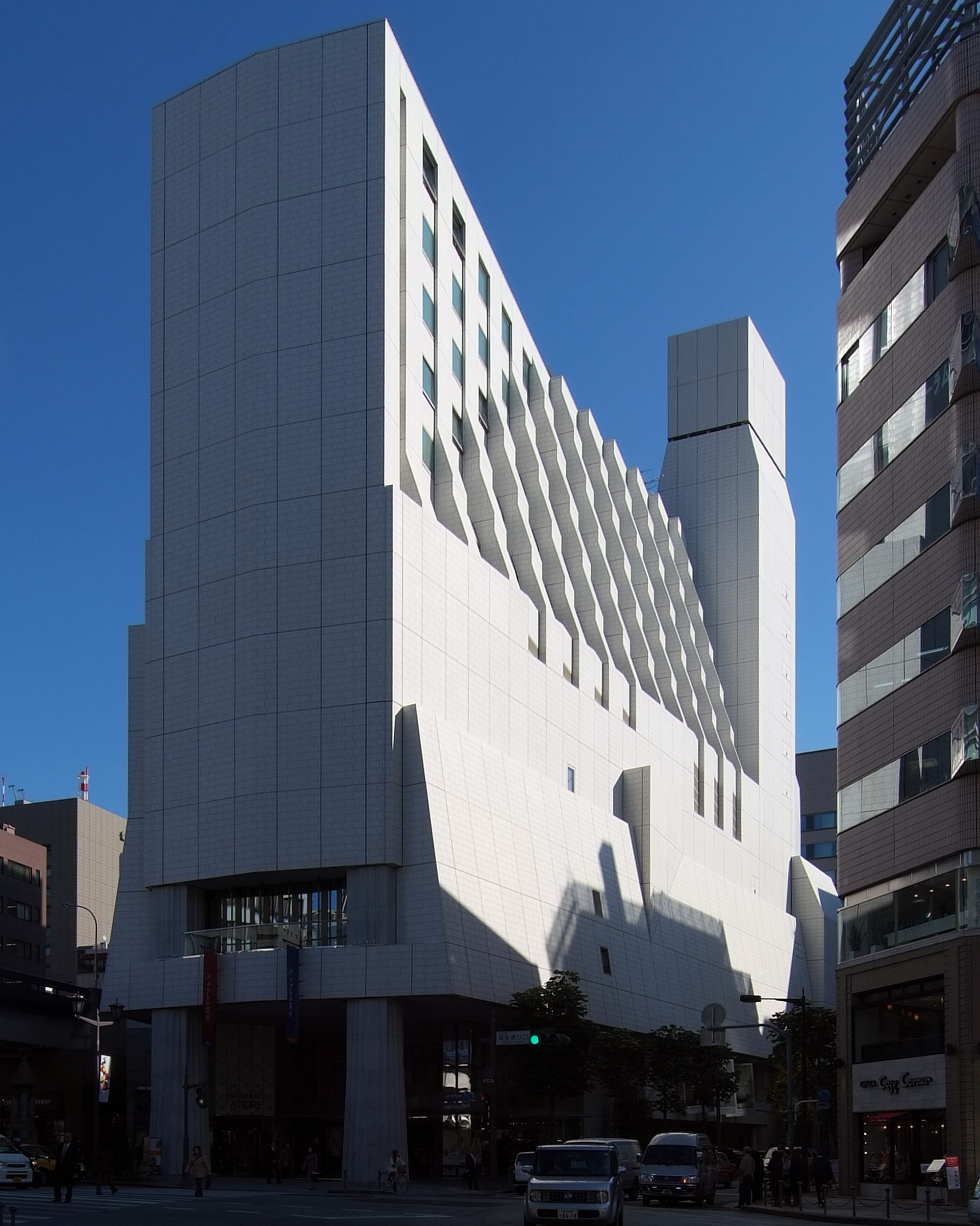
Hotel Seiyo Ginza, 1987

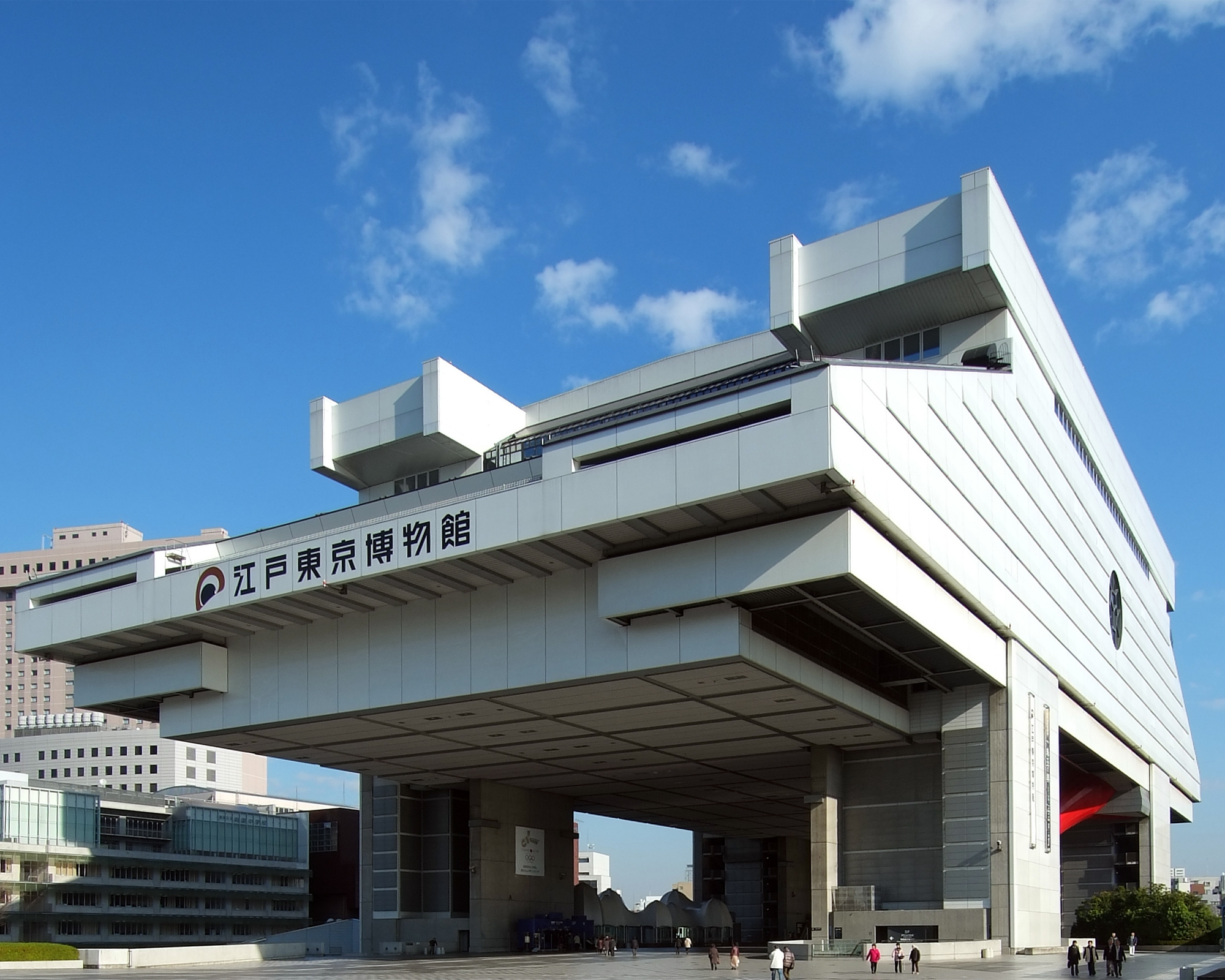
Edo-Tokyo Museum, 1993

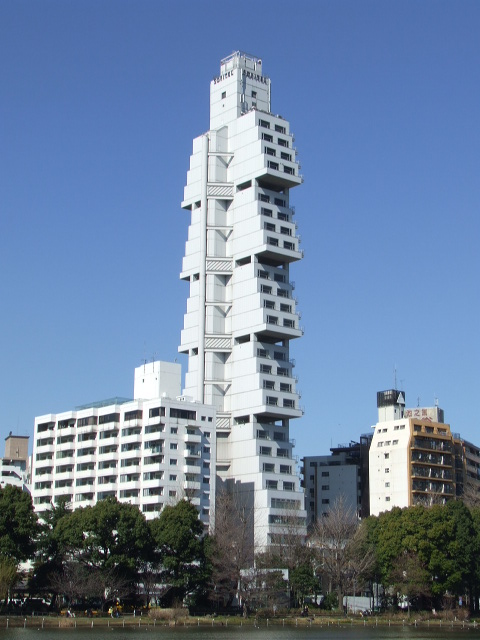
Hotel Sofitel Tokyo, 1994

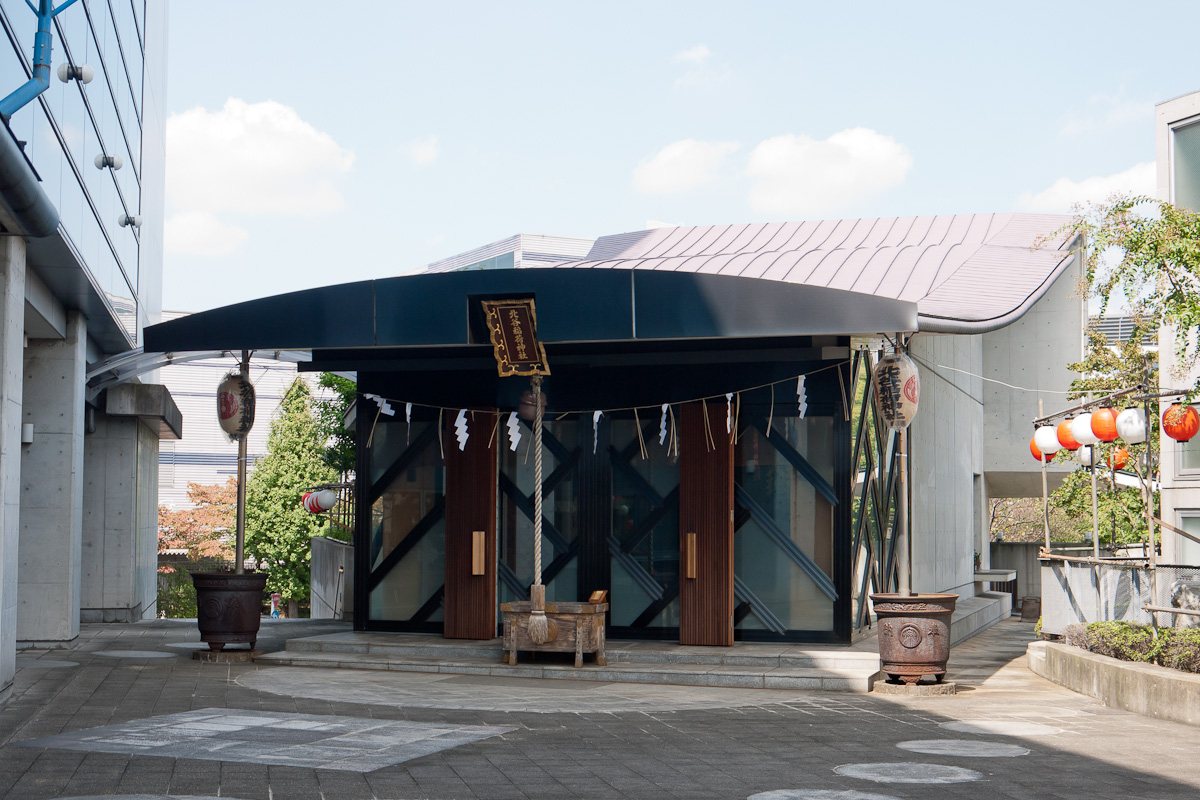
Kitaya Inari Shrine, 1997

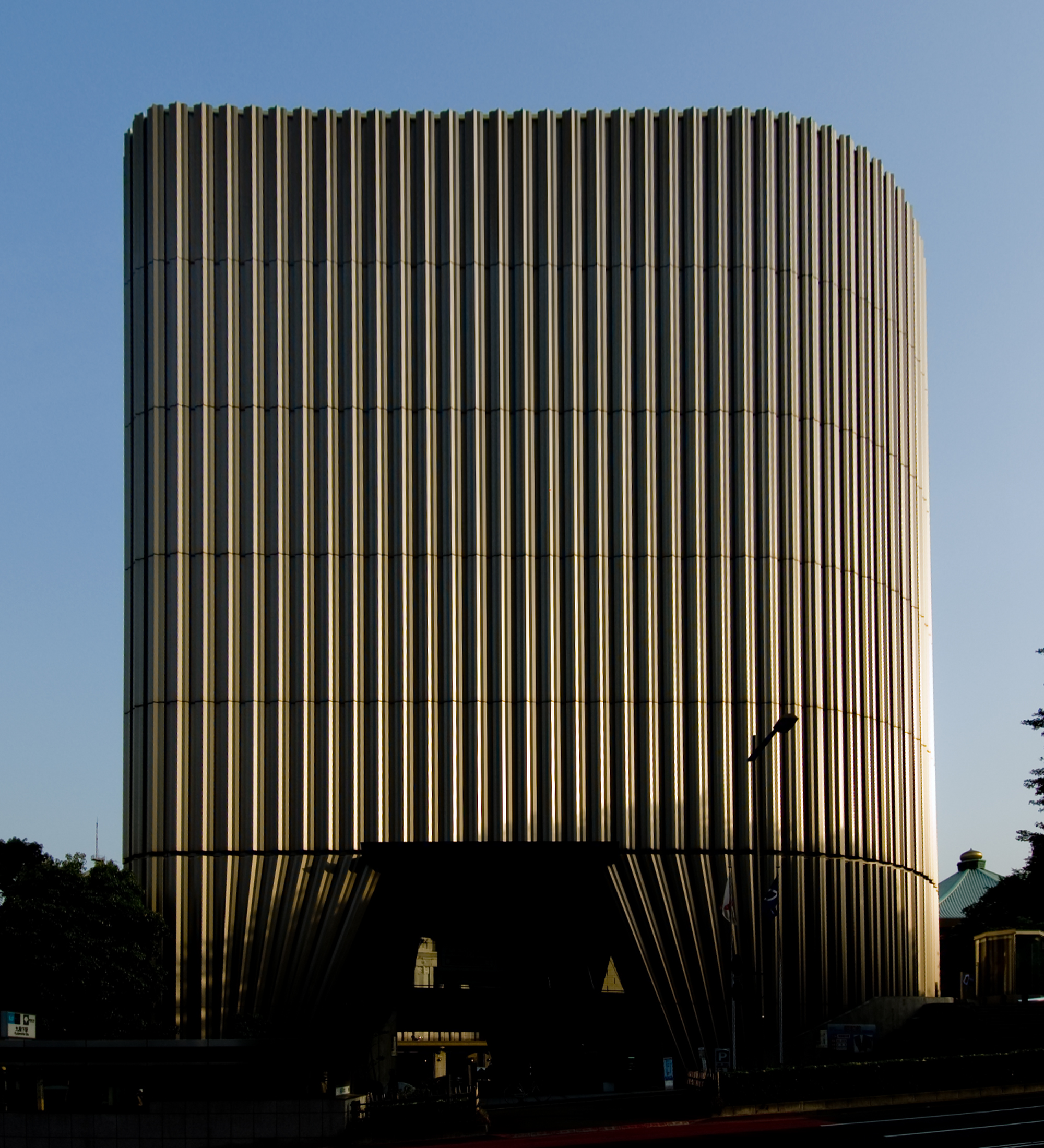
National Showa Memorial Museum, 1999
