= National Showa Memorial Museum =

Japanese museum

Coordinates: 35°41′42.1″N 139°45′2.6″E

- Shōwakan
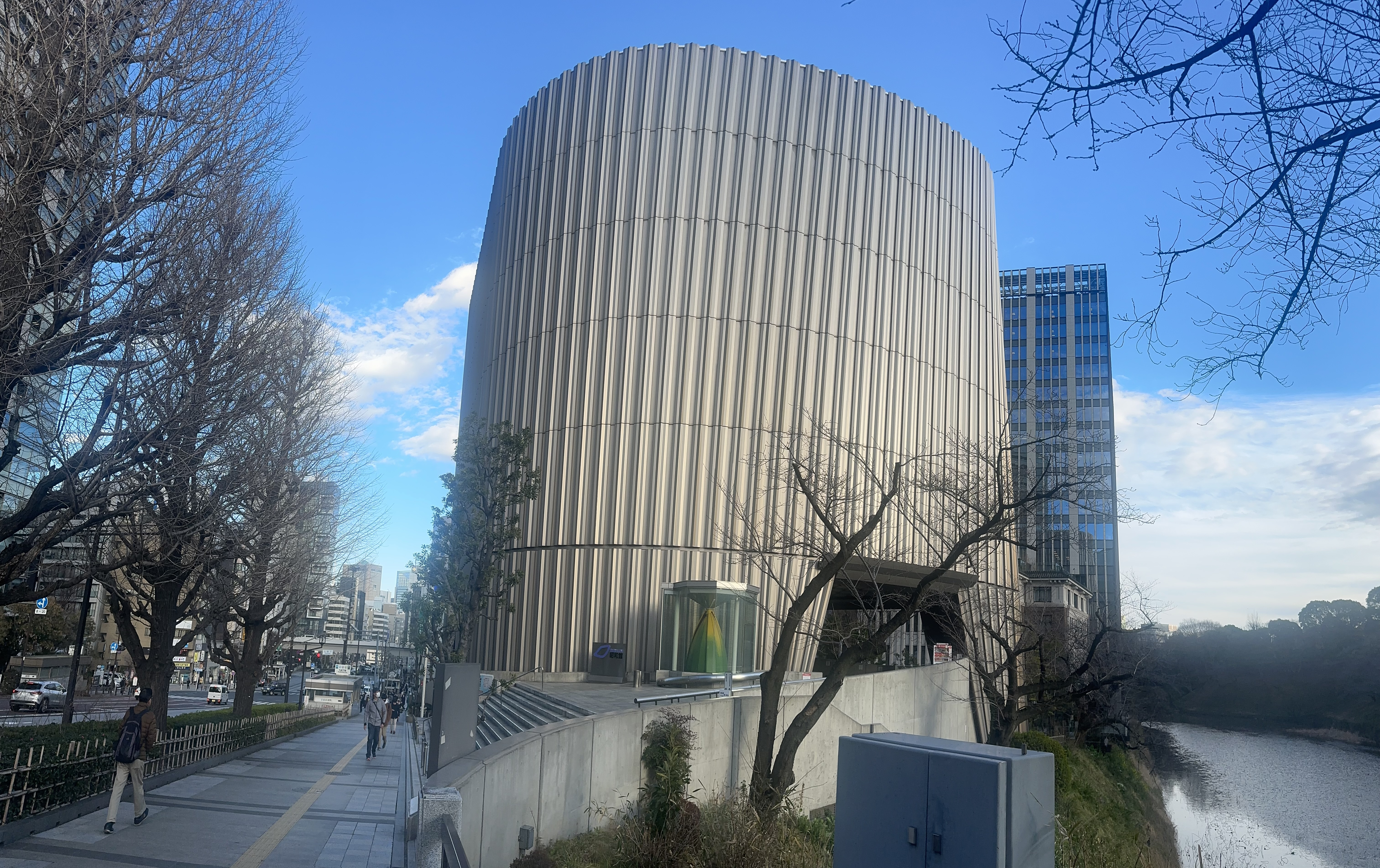
- The Shōwakan building in 2024
- Established: 27 March 1999
- Location: Chiyoda, Tokyo
- Website: http://www.showakan.go.jp/

The National Showa Memorial Museum (昭和館, Shōwakan) is a national museum in Chiyoda, Tokyo, Japan, managed by the Ministry of Health, Labour and Welfare. The museum is commonly referred to as the "Showakan" and primarily displays items illustrating the lifestyles of the Japanese people during and after World War II (the Shōwa period in the Japanese calendar, the period of Japanese history corresponding to the reign of Emperor Shōwa (Hirohito) from 25 December 1926 until his death on 7 January 1989).

Originally to be named The War Victims Peace Commemoration Prayer Hall, the museum opened on 27 March 1999, partly in response to strong lobbying by the Japan War-Bereaved Families Association, whose headquarters are in the adjacent Kudan Hall. The museum building was designed by Japanese architect Kiyonori Kikutake.

The Museum is located next to Kudanshita Station and the northern entrance to Kitanomaru Park.

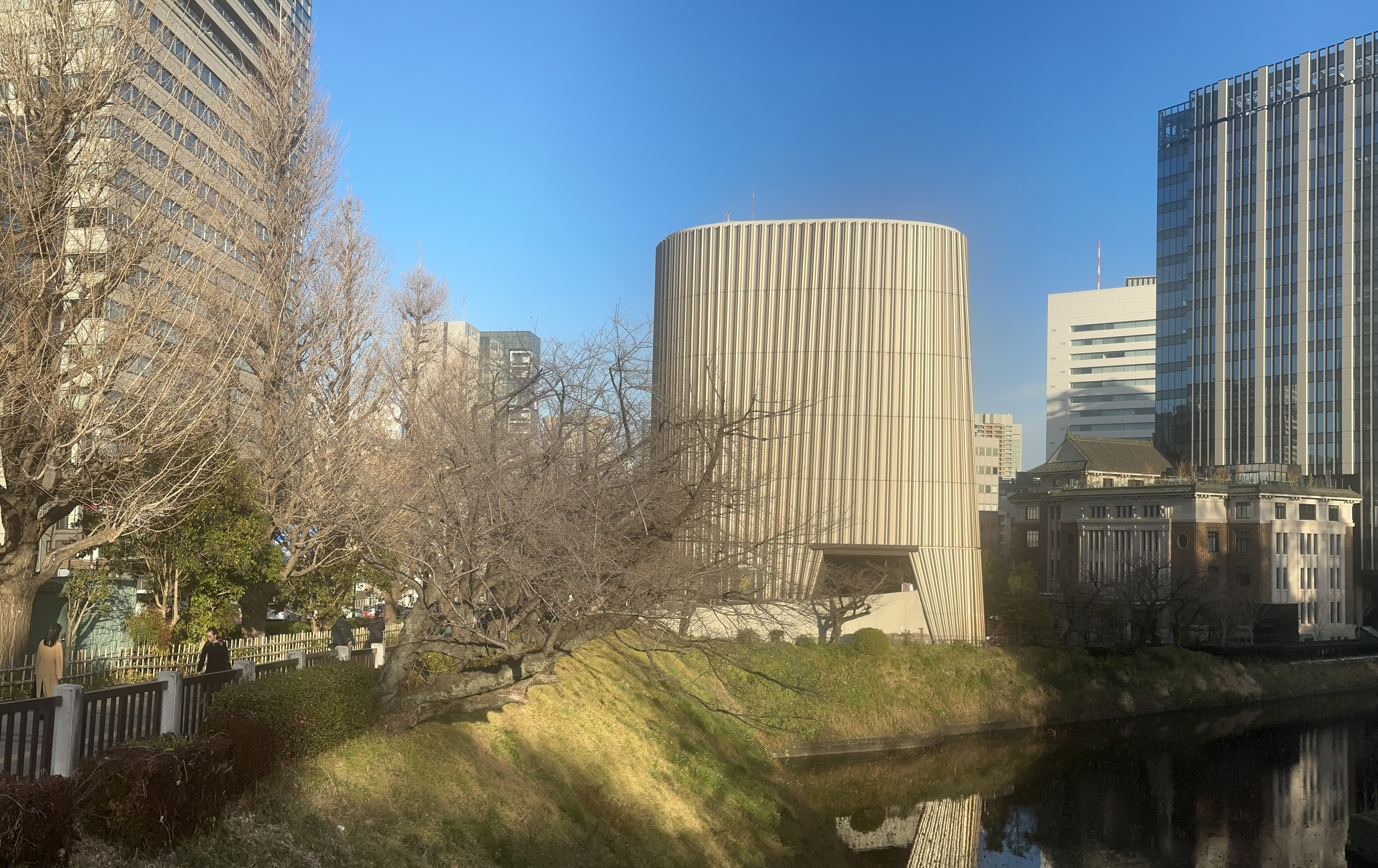
The museum and its environs in 2024

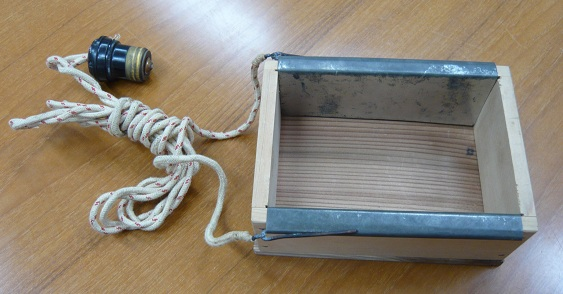
Wartime electric breadmaker on exhibit
