= Yamamoto Shōun =

Japanese print designer, painter, and illustrator

Typical signatures of Yamamoto Shōun reading “Shōun” (昇雲)

Yamamoto Shōun (山本 昇雲; December 30, 1870 – May 10, 1965), who is also known as Matsutani Shōun, was a Japanese print designer, painter, and illustrator. He was born in the city of Kōchi in Kōchi Prefecture, into a family of retainers of the shōgun and was given the name Mosaburō. As a teenager, he studied Kanō-school painting with Yanagimoto Doso and Kawada Shoryu. At about age 17, he moved to Tokyo, where he studied Nanga painting with Taki Katei. At 20 years of age, he was employed as an illustrator for Fugoku gaho, a pictorial magazine dealing with the sights in and around Tokyo. In his latter career, Shōun primarily produced paintings. He died in 1965, at the age of 96.

In addition to his magazine illustrations, Shōun is best known for his woodblock prints of beautiful women and a group of humorous shikishiban (prints about 7 by 8 inches). Shōun is considered a bridge between ukiyo-e and shin-hanga. His career spans the Meiji (1868–1912), Taishō (1912–1926) and Shōwa (1926–1989) periods.

Yamamoto Shōun signed most of his works with a very small compact signature reading Shōun (昇雲).

== Gallery ==
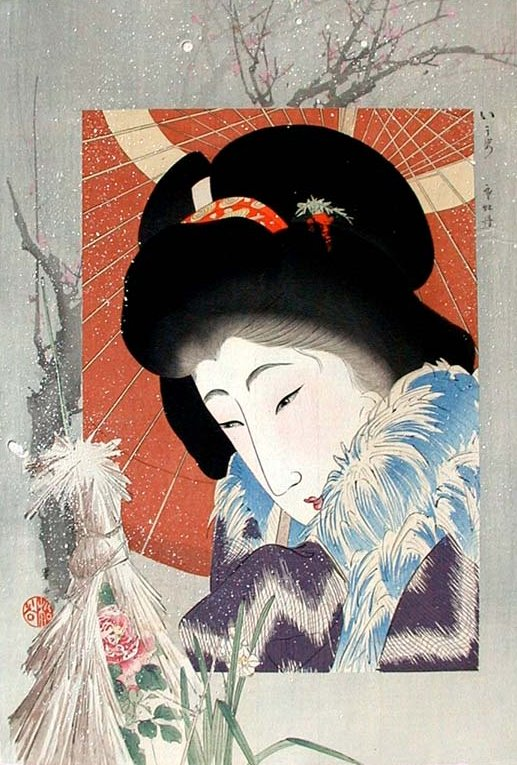
A Beauty Carrying an Umbrella, 1906. Woodblock print
