= Gakuen-ji =

- 鰐淵寺
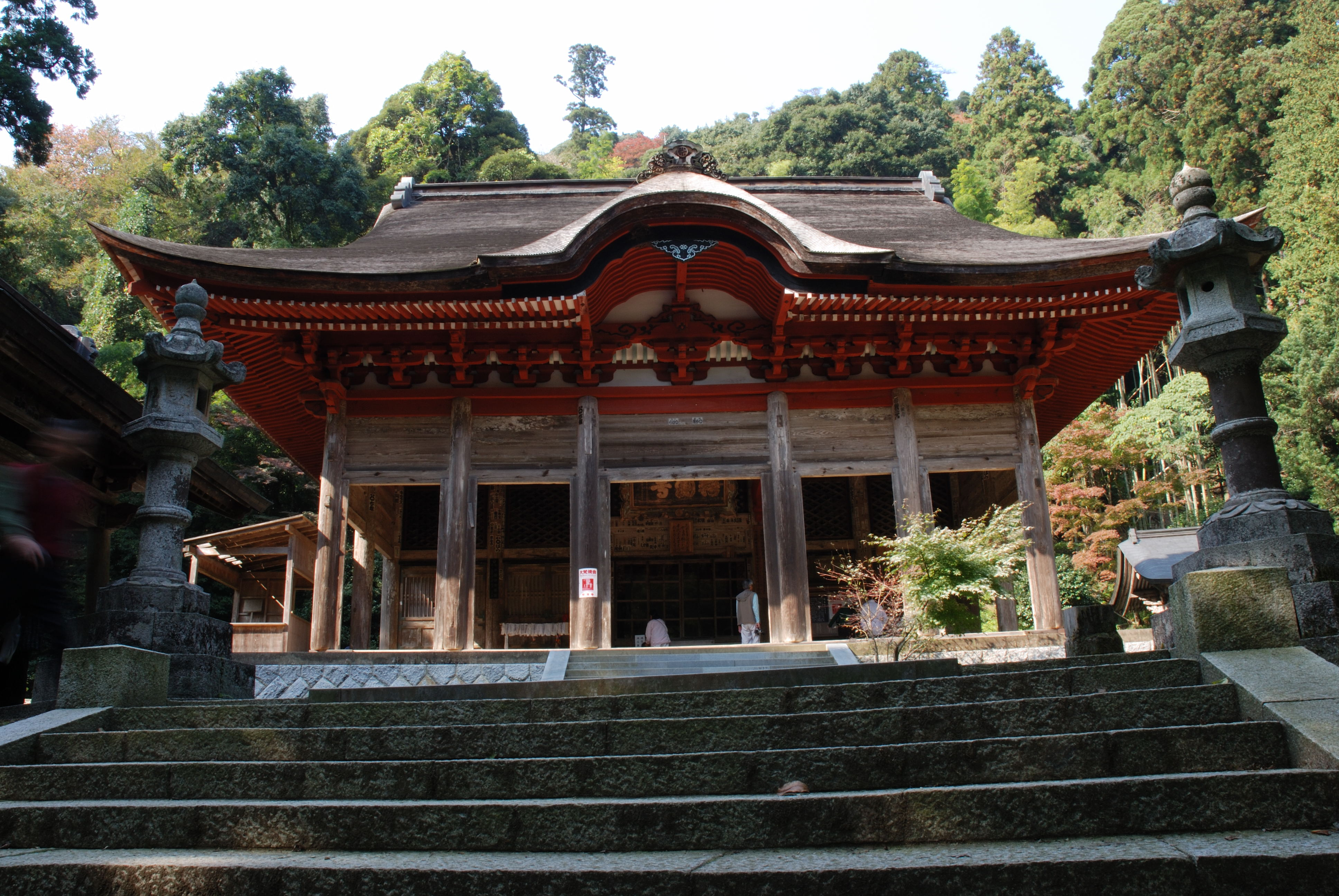
- Gakuen-ji Konpondo

- Location within Shimane Prefecture Location within Japan

Religion
- Affiliation: Buddhist
- Deity: Senju Kannon and Yakushi Nyorai
- Rite: Tendai
- Status: functional

Location
- Location: 148 Besshocho, Izumo-shi, Shimane-ken 691-0022
- Country: Japan
- Interactive map of Gakuen-ji
- Coordinates: 35°25′23.7″N 132°44′57.8″E

Architecture
- Founder: c. Empress Suiko
- Completed: c.594
- National Historic Site of Japan

Gakuen-ji (鰐淵寺) is a Buddhist temple located in the Besshō neighborhood of the city of Izumo, Shimane Prefecture, Japan. The temple's full name is Uryōzan Gakuen-ji (浮浪山 鰐淵寺). It belongs to the Tendai sect of Japanese Buddhism, and its honzon is a statue of Senjū Kannon and Yakushi Nyōrai. Its ground so have been designated a National Historic Site since 2016

== History ==
The early history of the temple is unknown. According to the temple's own legend, during the second year of Empress Suiko (594), Chishun Shōnin of Shinano prayed at the Uro-no-taki Waterfall at Mount Tabushi and healed Empress Suiko's eye disease, so a temple was built by imperial request. The name of the temple, Gakuen-ji, comes from the legend that when Chishun Shōnin was training near Uro-no-taki Falls, he accidentally dropped a Buddhist object into the basin of the waterfall, and a "crocodile" offered it back to him. Manpuku-ji, another temple in Izumo city shares the same legend. Shimane Prefecture, where Gakuen-ji is located, and neighboring Tottori Prefecture were thriving areas of the Shugendō mountain worship and this temple is thought to have developed as a training ground centered around the Uro-no-taki Falls. The Uro-no-taki Falls is located about 500 meters up the mountain stream from the entrance of Gakuen-ji. The temples does have two bronze statues of Kannon which are dated 692. While these would seem to verify the antiquity of the temple, there are no records as to when the temple came into the possession of these statues. The statues were collectively designated a National Important Cultural Property in 1902.

The temple converted to the Tendai sect when Ennin visied the region. A sutra mound in the temple grounds was found to contain a cylinder with an inscription dated between 1151 and 1153. The temple is mentioned in an imayō included in Cloistered Emperor Goshirakawa's "Ryōjinhishō" anthology at the end of the Heian period. However, until the end of the Heian period, Gakuen-ji was located in Karakawa, slightly to the west of its current location. Another temple (with Yakushi Nyorai as its principal image) in Hayashigi (present-day Izumo City) was absorbed by this. After that, Gakuen-ji was divided into the "North Temple", whose principal image was Senjū Kannon, and the "South Temple", whose principal image was Yakushi Nyōrai.

During the Kamakura period, the temple prospered under the protection of the Sasaki clan, who were shugo of Izumo Province and through relationship as bettō of Izumo-taisha, which is located to the southwest. There is also a legend that Benkei, the monk-retainer of Minamoto no Yoshitsune trained at Gakuen-ji for three years from the age of 18, and that he returned to this temple after helping defeat the Taira clan at the Battle of Dannoura. The bonshō which Benkei is said to have donated to this temple is a National Important Cultural Property.

During the Nanboku-chō period, the "North Temple" and the "South Temple" of Gakuen-ji supported opposing sides in the conflict. When Emperor Go-Daigo was exiled to the Oki Islands, the head priest of the South Temple visited the Emperor and received a written pledge that he would construct a Yakushi-dō chapel if his prayers that the Kamakura shogunate would be overthrown were fulfilled. This document still exists and has been designated a National Important Cultural Property. The two branches of the temple reconciled in 1347, at which time the temple was relocated to its present location and the temple rebuilt with the unusual feature of having two honzon main images. During the Sengoku period, when Mōri clan invaded Izumo Province, the temple and its sōhei armed monks supported the Mōri against the Amago clan, leading to the Mōri victory. However, after the start of the Edo period, the temple fell into a long slow decline.

The temple is located approximately 25 minutes by car from Unshū-Hirata Station on the Ichibata Electric Railway Kita-Matsue Line. The temple has a large number of cultural assets, most of which are either not open to the public or have been deposited at the Ancient Izumo Historical Museum.

== Gallery ==
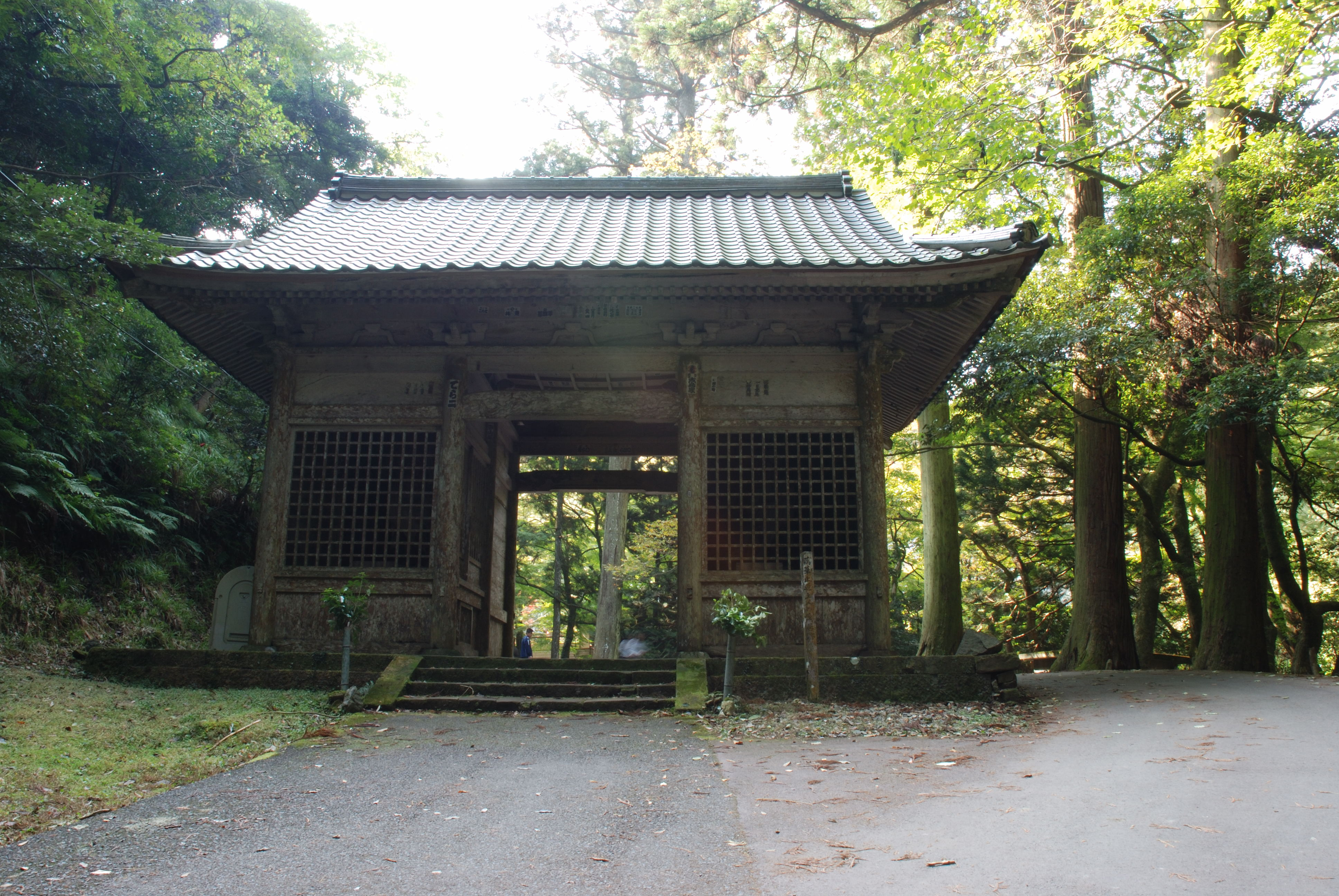
Niōmon

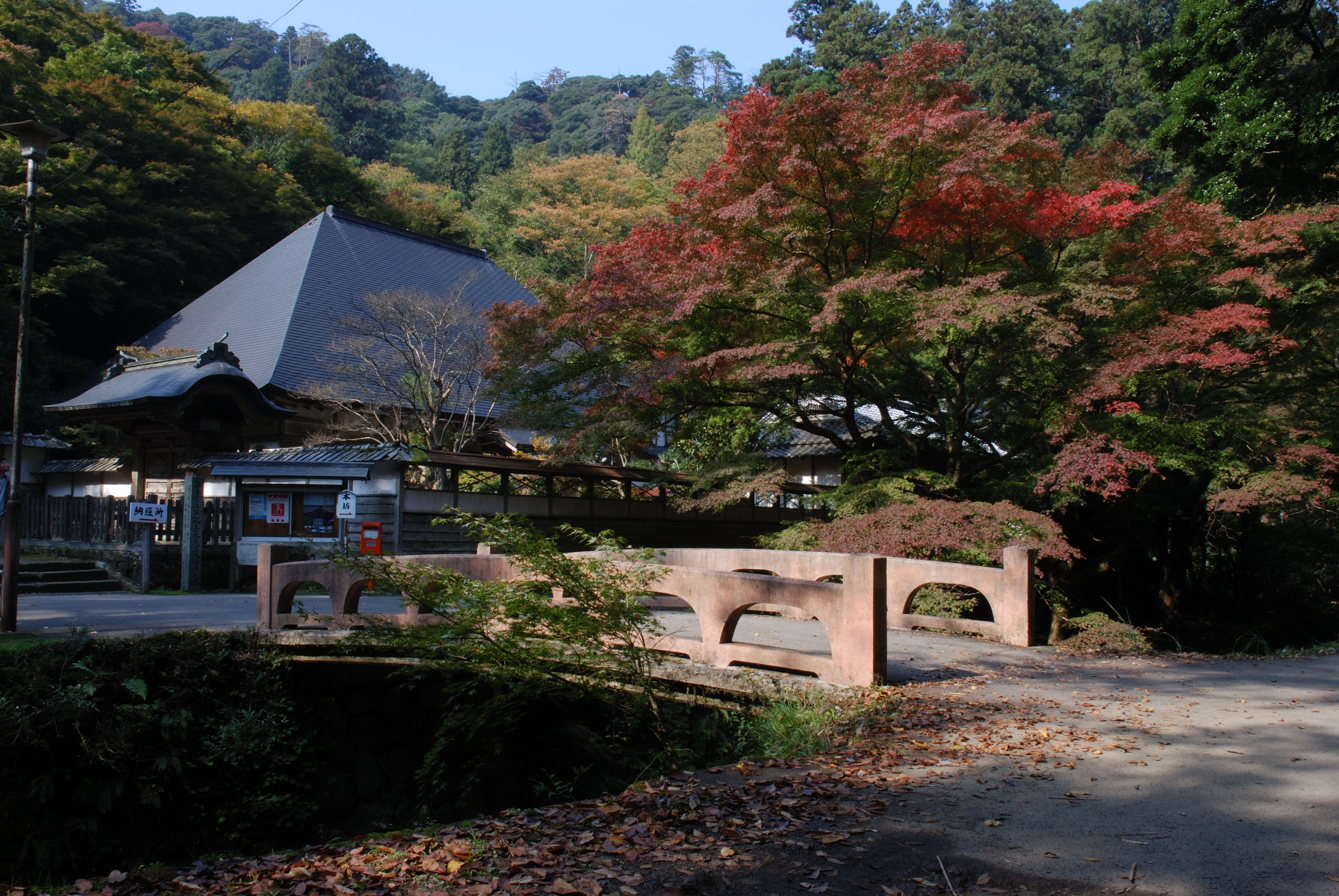
Hondō

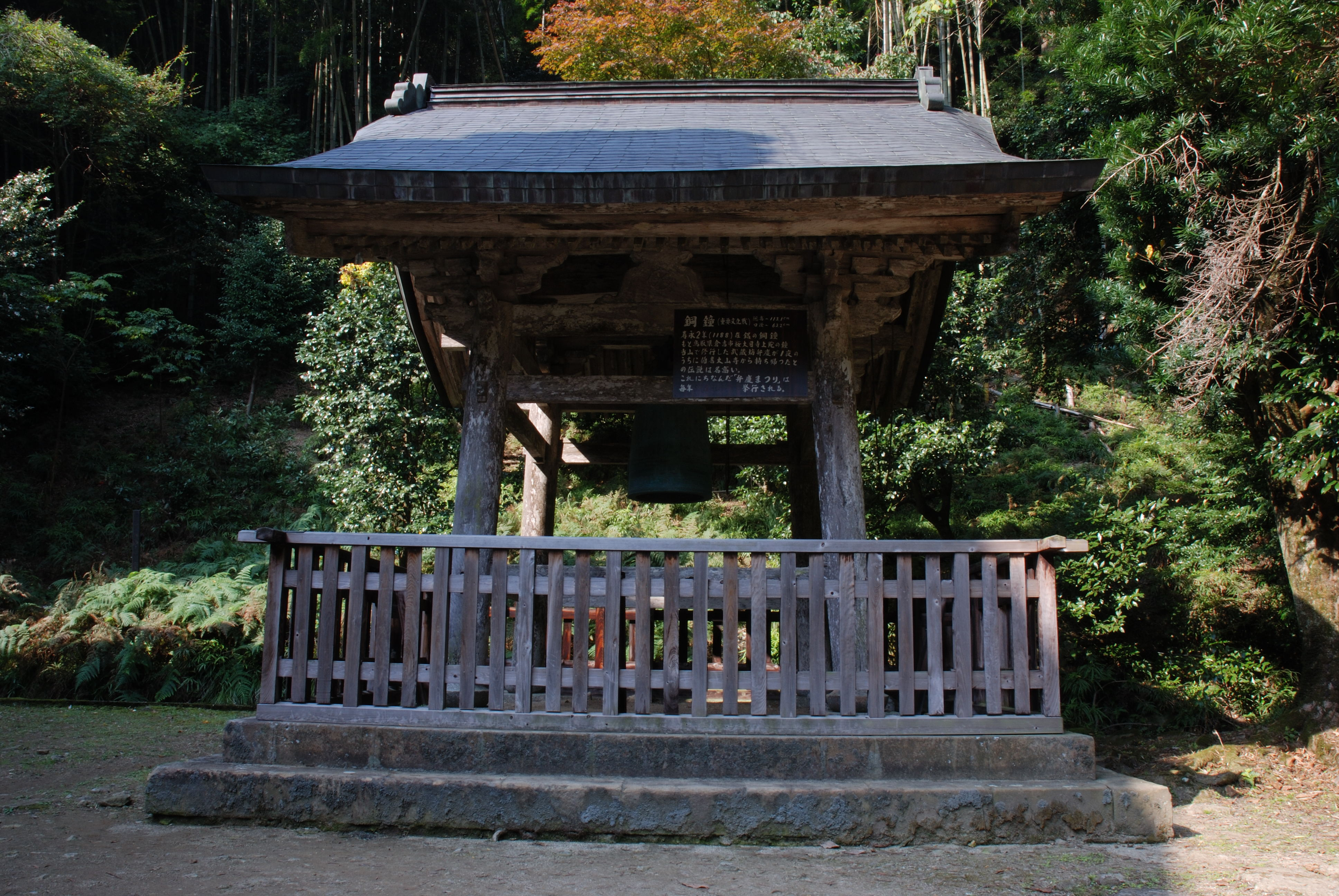
Bell

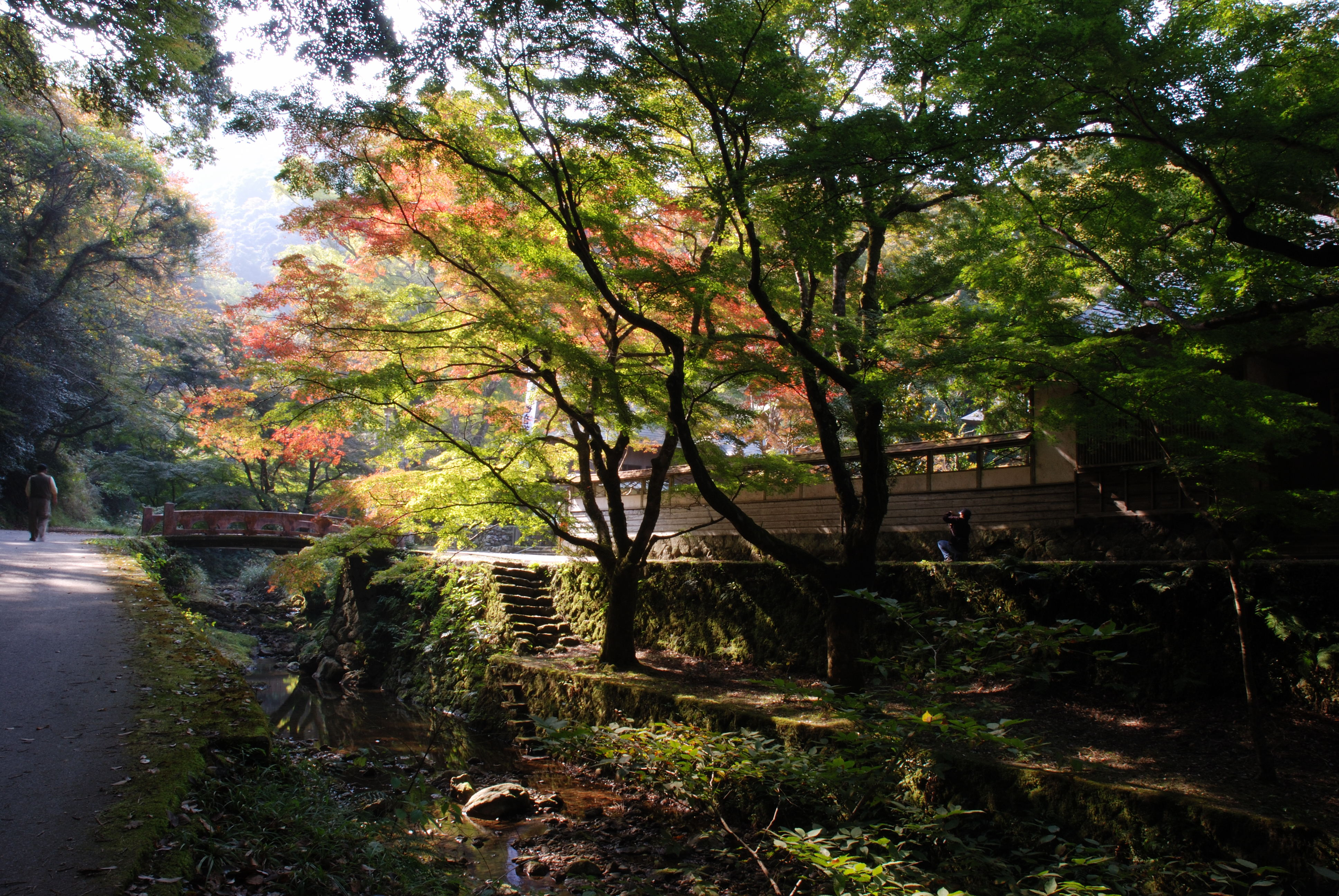
Gakuen River

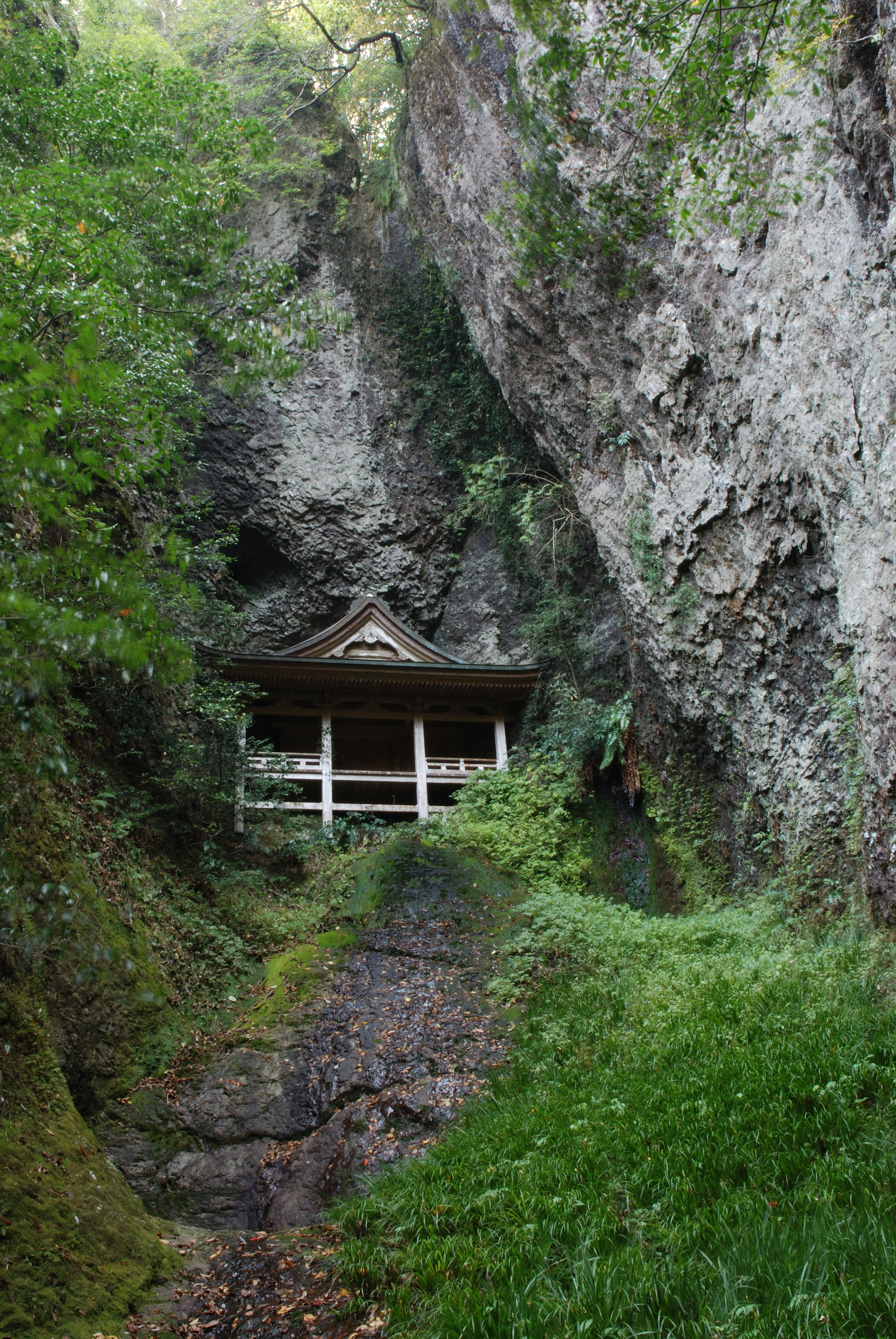
Zaō-dō

== See also ==
- List of Historic Sites of Japan (Shimane)
