= Shimane Art Museum =

Museum in Japan

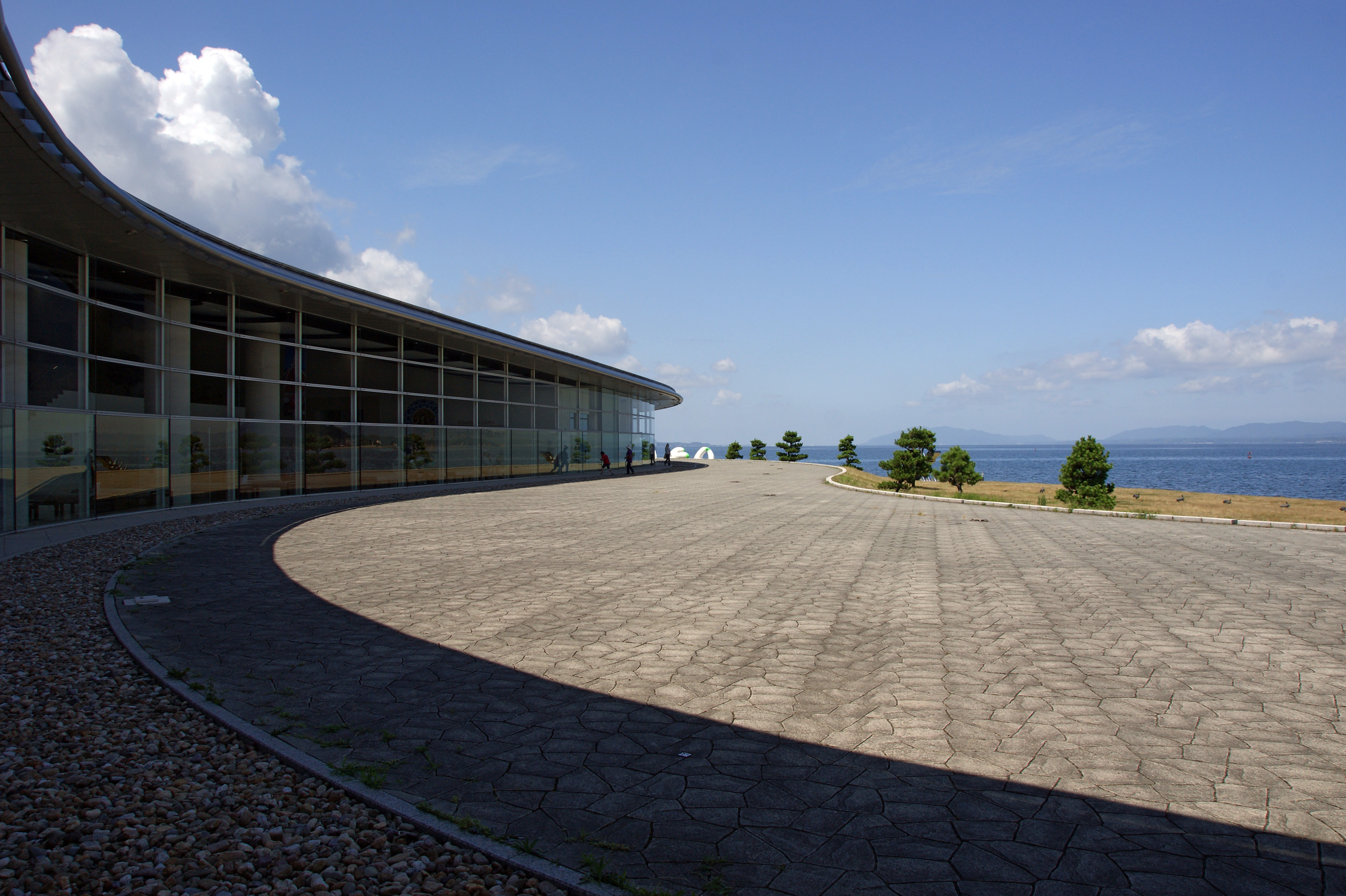
- Shimane Art Museum in Matsue
- Interactive fullscreen map
- Location: Matsue, Shimane, Japan
- Coordinates: 35.459465°N 133.052495°E

The Shimane Art Museum (島根県立美術館, Shimane kenritsu bijutsukan) opened in Matsue, Shimane Prefecture, Japan in 1999. Designed by Kiyonori Kikutake and with a total floor area of 12,500 square metres, it houses a collection of Japanese and Western art, including Momoyama folding screens and paintings by Corot, Sisley, Monet, and Gauguin.

== See also ==
- Shimane Museum of Ancient Izumo
