= Williams v. North Carolina =

Williams v. North Carolina may refer to:

- Williams v. North Carolina, 317 U.S. 287 (1942), also known as Williams v. North Carolina I
- Williams v. North Carolina, 325 U.S. 226 (1945), also known as Williams v. North Carolina II
