= 2019 Japanese imperial transition =

Japanese imperial abdication and transition

The 2019 Japanese imperial transition occurred on 30 April 2019 when the then 85-year-old Emperor Akihito of Japan abdicated from the Chrysanthemum Throne after reigning for 30 years, becoming the first Emperor of Japan to do so since Emperor Kōkaku in 1817. This marked the end of the Heisei era and the inception of the Reiwa era, and saw numerous festivities leading up to the accession of his eldest son and successor, Emperor Naruhito. The enthronement ceremony took place on 22 October 2019. Akihito's younger son, Prince Akishino, is his brother's heir presumptive. The ceremony cost 16.6 billion yen.

== Background ==
The practice in the Imperial Family has been that the death of the Emperor called for events of heavy mourning, continuing every day for two months, followed by funeral events which continue for one year. These various events occur simultaneously with events related to the new era, placing a very heavy strain on those involved in the events, in particular, the family left behind. It occurs to me from time to time to wonder whether it is possible to prevent such a situation.

— Emperor Akihito, 2016

In 2010, Emperor Akihito informed his advisory council that he would eventually like to retire from his position. However, no action was taken by senior members of the Imperial Household Agency.

On 13 July 2016, national broadcaster NHK reported that the Emperor wished to abdicate in favour of his eldest son, Crown Prince Naruhito, within a few years.

Senior officials within the Imperial Household Agency denied that there was any official plan for the monarch to abdicate. A potential abdication by the Emperor would require an amendment to the Imperial Household Law, which has no provisions for such a move.

On 8 August 2016, the Emperor gave a rare televised address, where he emphasized his advanced age and declining health; this address was interpreted as an implication of his intention to abdicate.

== Legislation ==
With the intention of the abdication now known, the Cabinet Office appointed Yasuhiko Nishimura as the Imperial Household Agency's Vice Grand Steward. In October 2016, the Cabinet Office appointed a panel of experts to debate the Emperor's abdication.

In January 2017, the Lower House Budget committee began informally debating the constitutional nature of the abdication.

On 19 May 2017, the bill that would allow Akihito to abdicate was issued by the Cabinet of Japan. On 8 June 2017, the National Diet passed it into law, permitting the government to begin arranging the process of handing over the position to Crown Prince Naruhito. This meant the Imperial Household Law was changed for the first time since 1949. The date of the abdication was set for 30 April 2019.

== Imperial Household Council ==
On 1 December 2017, the Imperial Household Council, which had not met in 24 years, did so in order to schedule the ceremonies involved in the first such transfer of power in two centuries.

The Imperial Household Council consists of the prime minister, the speaker and vice-speaker of the House of Representatives, the president and vice-president of the House of Councillors, the grand steward of the Imperial Household Agency, the chief justice and one justice of the Supreme Court, and two members of the Imperial family. Fumihito, Prince Akishino, the Emperor's younger son, asked to recuse himself as he would become the next Crown Prince. He was replaced by Masahito, Prince Hitachi, the Emperor's 82-year-old younger brother. The other member of the imperial family was Hitachi's wife, Hanako, Princess Hitachi.

Chief Cabinet Secretary Yoshihide Suga told reporters that the date was chosen to permit the old Emperor to be able to preside over the 30th anniversary Jubilee and to coincide with the Golden Week annual holiday period, turning the changeover from a period of mourning and makeshift ceremonial into a joyous, well-planned festival.

Finally, on 8 December 2017, the government created a special committee to oversee the events. According to Suga, it would "deal with the matter properly, taking into consideration the possible impact on the people's lives."

== Preparations for the imperial transition (2017–2019) ==
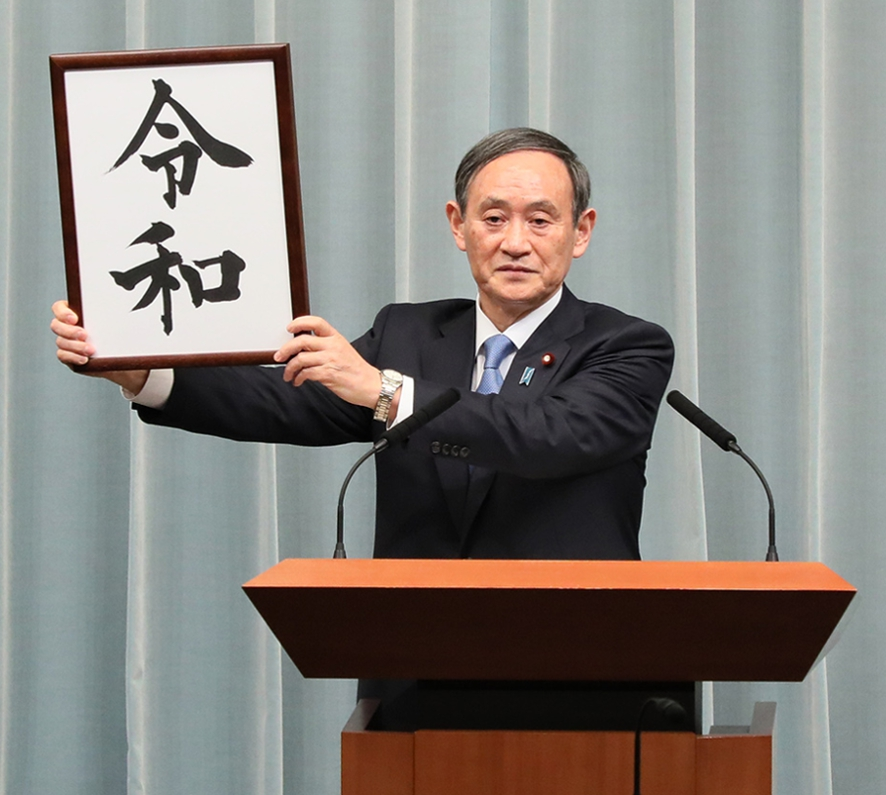
Chief Cabinet Secretary Yoshihide Suga announces the new Imperial era "Reiwa" to the press.

The committee met for the first time in January 2018, and the following month announced that a plan called a "basic policy statement" would be released on 3 April. Official farewell celebrations began with a 30th Jubilee ceremony on 12 February 2019, a delay which would avoid any implication of a celebration of the death of the Emperor Shōwa on 7 January.

=== Calendars ===
Since the Meiji Restoration in 1867, a new Japanese era starts the day after the death of the previous emperor. However, in Emperor Akihito's case, manufacturers of calendars, forms, and other paper products needed to know the new era's name in advance to produce wares in a timely manner.

While the era names for the Shōwa and Heisei eras were kept state secrets until the deaths of the previous emperors, that was not possible in this case, because an abdication had been unprecedented since the 1889 Meiji Constitution was adopted. In order to prevent divisive debate on the subject, delaying the announcement as late as was practically possible – either the old Emperor's birthday or his jubilee celebrations – had been suggested.

Until the era name became known, computers and software manufacturers needed to test their systems before the transition in order to ensure that the new era would be handled correctly by their software. Some systems provided test mechanisms to simulate a new era ahead of time.

The new era name, Reiwa (令和), was revealed on 1 April 2019 by Chief Cabinet Secretary Yoshihide Suga during a televised press conference.

== Imperial transition ==
Livestreamed video of the abdication ceremony

On 30 April 2019, the Emperor formally announced his abdication during a ceremony at the Tokyo Imperial Palace. Akihito formally ceased to be emperor at midnight JST on the night between 30 April and 1 May, which heralded the beginning of the Reiwa era. He received the title of Jōkō (上皇; Emperor Emeritus), an abbreviation of Daijō Tennō (太上天皇), upon abdicating, and his wife, the Empress, became Jōkōgō (上皇后; Empress Emerita). The formal accession ceremony of Emperor Naruhito took place the following morning.

=== Golden Week, 2019 ===
The government consolidated the Golden Week into a special ten-day holiday block lasting from 27 April to 6 May. Even without the imperial transition, 29 April and 3–6 May were scheduled as national holidays in 2019, following the weekend of 27–28 April. To mark the imperial transition, the government determined that the abdication and enthronement would both be national holidays. Japanese law states that a regular work day sandwiched between two national holidays becomes a public holiday.

== Enthronement ceremony ==
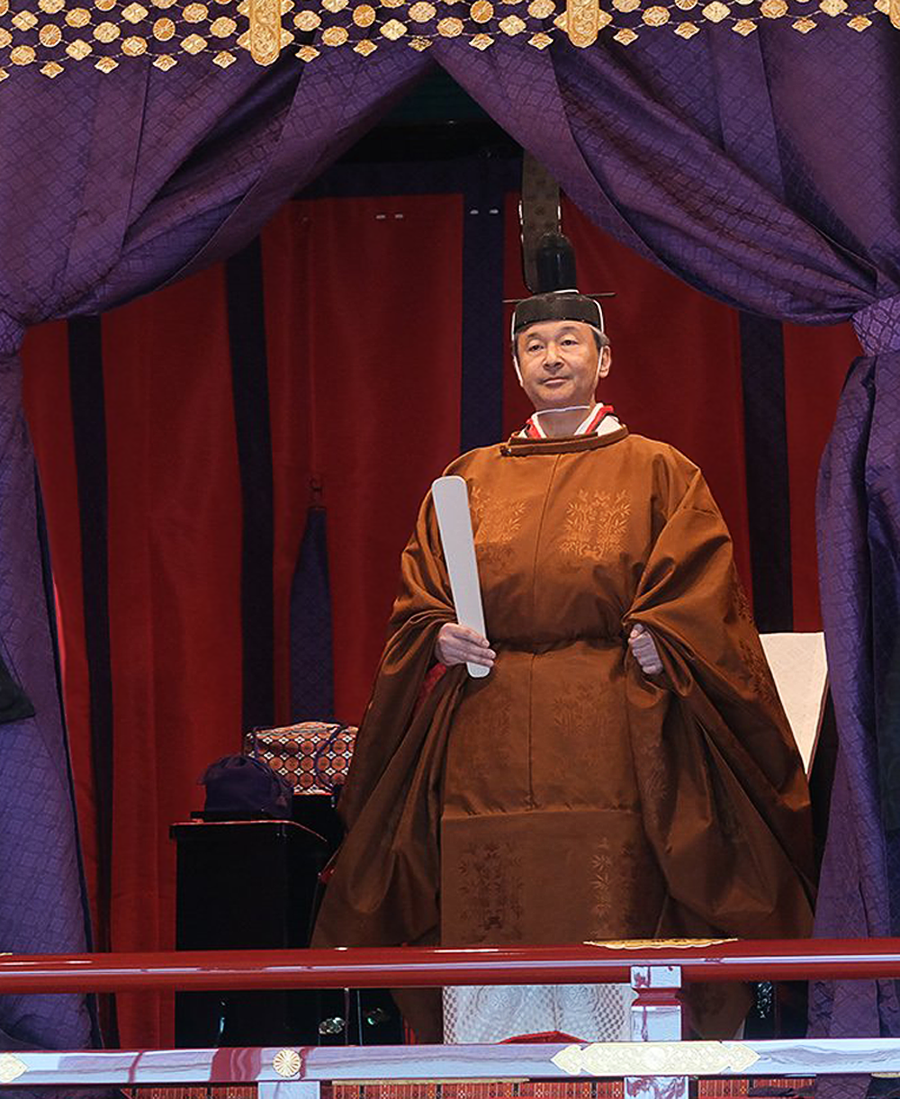
Emperor Naruhito during the enthronement ceremony

The enthronement ceremony of Emperor Naruhito took place at the Tokyo Imperial Palace on 22 October 2019, marking the end of the transition period. It was an extra holiday. It was attended by roughly 2,000 dignitaries, including heads of state and government and representatives of around 174 countries.

The ceremony began at 9 am JST (02:00 UTC) with the private Kashikodokoro-Ōmae-no-gi (賢所大前の儀) ritual when the Emperor, dressed in white traditional court wear, visited the Kashiko-dokoro, the main sanctuary in the Tokyo Imperial Palace where the Sun Goddess is said to be enshrined.

At 1 pm JST (06:00 UTC), the main portion of the ceremony began. Emperor Naruhito wore the sokutai and Empress Masako wore the jūnihitoe. They took their places on the 6.5-metre (21-foot) Takamikura throne at the Matsu-no-Ma (Pine Hall), and the Emperor gave a speech which emphasized his role as the symbol of the State. The speech then followed by a congratulatory speech by Prime Minister Shinzo Abe and three cheers of banzai. A state banquet hosted by the new Emperor was organized later in the day.

== Post-enthronement parade ==
A parade to celebrate Naruhito's enthronement as Emperor took place on 10 November at 3 pm local time (06:00 UTC) as tens of thousands of people gathered in the city centre of Tokyo waving the Japanese flag. The Emperor and Empress used a Toyota Century convertible, which was followed by vehicles with Crown Prince Fumihito and his wife Crown Princess Kiko as well as Shinzō Abe.

The procession forming a 400-metre motorcade was started from Tokyo Imperial Palace, passed the Tokyo Metropolitan Police Department and the main gate of the Diet building before arriving at the couple's residence in the Akasaka Imperial Grounds on the 4.6-kilometre-long (3-mile-long) route.

== Timeline ==
Heisei era

=== 2010 ===
Emperor Akihito informs his advisory council that he would like to abdicate eventually and asks for their help in arranging this.

=== 2016 ===
- July: Emperor Akihito leaks to the press his wishes to abdicate.
- 13 July: NHK reports his wishes to the public.
- 8 August: The Emperor makes address to the public on television and radio implying the above wish.
- September: Prime Minister Shinzo Abe appoints a committee to investigate the legal ramifications of a possible abdication.

=== 2017 ===
- 12 January: Public debate on abdication in the House of Representatives Budget committee.
- 11 May: A report of a joint committee of the National Diet recommends a one-off bill to facilitate the first imperial abdication in two centuries.
- 19 May: Third Abe Cabinet (Second Reshuffle) introduces the Emperor abdication bill.
- 2 June: The abdication bill passes the House of Representatives (Lower House of the National Diet).
- 9 June: The abdication bill passes the House of Councillors (Upper House of the National Diet).
- November: The Cabinet suggests that 30 April 2019 will be an appropriate date of abdication.
- 1 December: The Imperial Household Council, which has not met in a quarter century, does so and approves the date suggested.
- 8 December: The Cabinet approves the date, authorizing the creation of an "imperial transition committee" to oversee the ceremonies involved, with Chief Cabinet Secretary Yoshihide Suga as chairman.

=== 2018 ===
- January: The committee meets for the first time.
- 20 February: Preliminary paper on official ceremonials issued stating that the abdication will be a state occasion.
- 3 April: White Paper on official ceremonials is issued by the committee.
- 23 December: The final celebration of Akihito's birthday as the Emperor.

=== 2019 ===
- 8 January: 30th Anniversary Jubilee begins with commemoration ceremonies for the Emperor Shōwa. Start of official farewell celebrations for Emperor Akihito.
- 14 February: A survey was listed out for suggestions about Naruhito's era name.
- 24 February: 30th Jubilee of Akihito celebrations at the National Theater.
- 25 February: The Imperial Household Agency announces that Akihito and Michiko's English titles upon abdication will be His Imperial Majesty The Emperor Emeritus and Her Imperial Majesty The Empress Emerita, respectively.
- 12 March: Traditional private abdication ceremonies and rituals began with the Kashikodokoro-ni-Taii-oyobi-sono-Kijitsu-Hōkoku-no-gi ceremony.
  - Kashikodokoro-ni-Taii-oyobi-sono-Kijitsu-Hōkoku-no-gi (賢所に退位及びその期日奉告の儀) in which Emperor Akihito reports his abdication to the sun goddess Amaterasu-ōmikami at the Kashiko-dokoro of the Three Palace Sanctuaries of the Imperial Palace.
  - Kōreiden-Shinden-ni-Taii-oyobi-sono-Kijitsu-Hōkoku-no-gi (皇霊殿神殿に退位及びその期日奉告の儀) in which Emperor Akihito reports his abdication to the Ancestral Spirits of the Imperial Family from one year after their death and the Amatsukami (天津神) from Takamagahara and Kunitsukami (国津神) from Japanese mythology at the Kōrei-den and Shin-den of the Three Palace Sanctuaries of the Imperial Palace respectively.
  - Jingū-Jinmu-Tennō-Sanryō-oyobi-Shōwa-Tennō-izen-Yondai-no-Tennō-Sanryō-ni-Chokushi-Hakken-no-gi (神宮神武天皇山陵及び昭和天皇以前四代の天皇山陵に勅使発遣の儀) in which Imperial messengers and priests are sent to the Ise Grand Shrine, the mausoleum of Emperor Jimmu, and the mausoleums of the 4 most recent Emperors to report Emperor Akihito's abdication.
- 15 March: Traditional private abdication rituals.
  - Jingū-ni-Hohei-no-gi (神宮に奉幣の儀) Imperial messengers and priests made offerings and reported Emperor Akihito's abdication at the Ise Grand Shrine.
  - Jinmu-Tennō-Sanryō-oyobi-Shōwa-Tennō-izen-Yondai-no-Tennō-Sanryō-ni-Hōhei-no-gi (神武天皇山陵及び昭和天皇以前四代の天皇山陵に奉幣の儀) Imperial messengers and priests reported Emperor Akihito's abdication to the mausoleum of Emperor Jimmu, and the mausoleums of the 4 most recent Emperors.
- 26 March: Jinmu-Tennō-Sanryō-ni-Shin'etsu-no-gi (神武天皇山陵に親謁の儀) The Emperor and Empress paid respects at the mausoleum of Emperor Jimmu in Kashihara, Nara Prefecture.
- 1 April: The new Era name is approved by the Cabinet, and is officially announced to the world by Chief Cabinet Secretary Yoshihide Suga as Reiwa (令和).
- 18 April: Jingū-ni-Shin'etsu-no-gi (神宮に親謁の儀) The Emperor and Empress pay respects at the Ise Grand Shrine in Ise, Mie Prefecture.
- 21 April: Local elections happen in Japan.
- 23 April: Shōwa-Tennō-Sanryō-ni-Shin'etsu-no-gi (昭和天皇山陵に親謁の儀) The Emperor and Empress pay respects at the mausoleum of his late father, Emperor Shōwa, at the Musashi Imperial Graveyard in Hachiōji, Tokyo.
- 27 April: Extra Holiday: Start of Golden Week holiday season.
- 28 April: Extra Holiday
- 29 April: Shōwa Day
- 30 April: Taiirei-Seiden-no-gi (退位礼正殿の儀) Emperor Akihito announces his resignation from the throne and receives audience with the representatives of the people for the last time during a relatively brief ceremony in the Pine Hall (Matsu-no-Ma); the ceremony also featured two of the Three Sacred Treasures, and the Privy Seal and State Seal. Akihito becomes the first Jōkō since 1840. Heisei era comes to an end.

Reiwa era

- 1 May: Beginning of the Reiwa era and accession date of Emperor Naruhito.
  - Kenji-tō-Shōkei-no-gi (剣璽等承継の儀) Emperor Naruhito inherits two of the three Imperial Regalia of Japan, as well as the Privy Seal and State Seal. This ceremony also takes place in the Hall of Pines.
  - Sokui-go-Chōken-no-gi (即位後朝見の儀) in which Emperor Naruhito meets for the first time with the representatives of the people.
- 2 May: Extra Holiday
- 3 May: Constitution Memorial Day
- 4 May: Greenery Day
- 5 May: Children's Day
- 6 May: Extra Holiday: End of Golden Week Celebrations.
- 22 October: Enthronement Ceremony
  - Sokuirei-Seiden-no-gi (即位礼正殿の儀) in which Emperor Naruhito proclaims the enthronement and receives felicitations from representatives of the people from at home and abroad.
- 22, 25, 29, 31 October: Kyōen-no-gi (饗宴の儀) Court banquets to celebrate the enthronement and receive congratulations from guests.
- 10 November (rescheduled from 22 October): Shukuga-Onretsu-no-gi (祝賀御列の儀) Procession to show and receive good wishes from the people by motor car.
- 14–15 November: Daijōsai (大嘗祭)

=== 2020 ===
- 23 February: The first celebration of Naruhito's birthday as the Emperor.
- 8 November (rescheduled from 19 April): Fumihito, Prince Akishino was promoted to kōshi (a rank equivalent to crown prince).

== Ceremonies ==
The following table lists abdication and enthronement ceremonies in chronological order. Private ceremonies are listed as "Private". State acts are listed as "Public".

Date	Ceremony	Native Name	Description	Type	Location
2019
12 March	Kashikodokoro-ni-Taii-oyobi-sono-Kijitsu-Hōkoku-no-gi	賢所に退位及びその期日奉告の儀	Emperor Akihito reports his abdication to the sun goddess Amaterasu-ōmikami at the Kashiko-dokoro of the Three Palace Sanctuaries of the Imperial Palace.	Private	Kashiko-dokoro, Three Palace Sanctuaries, Tokyo Imperial Palace, Tokyo
12 March	Kōreiden-Shinden-ni-Taii-oyobi-sono-Kijitsu-Hōkoku-no-gi	皇霊殿神殿に退位及びその期日奉告の儀	Emperor Akihito reports his abdication to the Ancestral Spirits of the Imperial Family from one year after their death and the Amatsukami (天津神) from Takamagahara and Kunitsukami (国津神) from Japanese mythology at the Kōrei-den and Shin-den of the Three Palace Sanctuaries of the Imperial Palace respectively.	Private	Kōrei-den and Shin-den, Three Palace Sanctuaries, Tokyo Imperial Palace, Tokyo
12 March	Jingū-Jinmu-Tennō-Sanryō-oyobi-Shōwa-Tennō-izen-Yondai-no-Tennō-Sanryō-ni-Chokushi-Hakken-no-gi	神宮神武天皇山陵及び昭和天皇以前四代の天皇山陵に勅使発遣の儀	Imperial messengers and priests are sent to the Ise Grand Shrine, the mausoleum of Emperor Jimmu, and the mausoleums of the 4 most recent Emperors to report Emperor Akihito's abdication.	Private	Imperial Residence, Tokyo Imperial Palace, Tokyo
15 March	Jingū-ni-Hohei-no-gi	神宮に奉幣の儀	Imperial messengers and priests make offerings and report Emperor Akihito's abdication at the Ise Grand Shrine.	Private	Ise Grand Shrine, Ise, Mie Prefecture
15 March	Jinmu-Tennō-Sanryō-oyobi-Shōwa-Tennō-izen-Yondai-no-Tennō-Sanryō-ni-Hōhei-no-gi	神武天皇山陵及び昭和天皇以前四代の天皇山陵に奉幣の儀	Imperial messengers and priests report Emperor Akihito's abdication to the mausoleum of Emperor Jimmu, and the mausoleums of the 4 most recent Emperors.	Private	Unebi-yama no ushitora no sumi no misasagi (畝傍山東北陵), Kashihara, Nara Prefecture (Emperor Jimmu) Musashino no Misasagi (武藏野陵), Musashi Imperial Graveyard, Hachiōji, Tokyo (Emperor Shōwa); Tama no Misasagi (多摩陵), Musashi Imperial Graveyard, Hachiōji, Tokyo (Emperor Taishō); Fushimi Momoyama no Misasagi (伏見桃山陵), Fushimi-ku, Kyoto, Kyoto Prefecture (Emperor Meiji); Nochi no tsuki no wa no misasagi (後月輪東山陵), Higashiyama-ku, Kyoto, Kyoto Prefecture (Emperor Kōmei)
26 March	Jinmu-Tennō-Sanryō-ni-Shin'etsu-no-gi	神武天皇山陵に親謁の儀	The Emperor and Empress pay respects at the mausoleum of Emperor Jimmu in Kashihara, Nara Prefecture.	Private	Unebi-yama no ushitora no sumi no misasagi (畝傍山東北陵), Kashihara, Nara Prefecture
18 April	Jingū-ni-Shin'etsu-no-gi	神宮に親謁の儀	The Emperor and Empress pay respects at the Ise Grand Shrine.	Private	Ise Grand Shrine, Ise, Mie Prefecture
23 April	Shōwa-Tennō-Sanryō-ni-Shin'etsu-no-gi	昭和天皇山陵に親謁の儀	The Emperor and Empress pay respects at the mausoleum of his late father, Emperor Shōwa, at the Musashi Imperial Graveyard in Hachiōji, Tokyo.	Private	Musashino no Misasagi (武藏野陵), Musashi Imperial Graveyard, Hachiōji, Tokyo
30 April	Taiirei-Tōjitsu-Kashikodokoro-Ōmae-no-gi	退位礼当日賢所大前の儀	Emperor Akihito reports the conduct of his abdication to the sun goddess Amaterasu-ōmikami at the Kashiko-dokoro of the Three Palace Sanctuaries of the Imperial Palace.	Private	Kashiko-dokoro, Three Palace Sanctuaries, Tokyo Imperial Palace, Tokyo
30 April	Taiirei-Tōjitsu-Kōreiden-Shinden-ni-Hōkoku-no-gi	退位礼当日皇霊殿神殿に奉告の儀	Emperor Akihito reports the conduct of his abdication to the Ancestral Spirits of the Imperial Family from one year after their death and the Amatsukami (天津神) from Takamagahara and Kunitsukami (国津神) from Japanese mythology at the Kōrei-den and Shin-den of the Three Palace Sanctuaries of the Imperial Palace respectively.	Private	Kōrei-den and Shin-den, Three Palace Sanctuaries, Tokyo Imperial Palace, Tokyo
30 April	Taiirei-Seiden-no-gi	退位礼正殿の儀	Emperor Akihito announces his resignation from the throne at the Seiden-Matsu-no-Ma room (正殿松の間; "State Hall") and receives audience with the representatives of the people for the last time.	Public	Seiden-Matsu-no-Ma (正殿松の間), Tokyo Imperial Palace, Tokyo
1 May	Kenji-tō-Shōkei-no-gi	剣璽等承継の儀	Emperor Naruhito inherits two of the three Imperial Regalia of Japan, as well as the Privy Seal, and the State Seal at the Seiden-Matsu-no-Ma room (正殿松の間; "State Hall").	Public	Seiden-Matsu-no-Ma (正殿松の間), Tokyo Imperial Palace, Tokyo
1 May	Sokui-go-Chōken-no-gi	即位後朝見の儀	Emperor Naruhito meets for the first time with the representatives of the people.	Public	Seiden-Matsu-no-Ma (正殿松の間), Tokyo Imperial Palace, Tokyo
1 May	Kashikodokoro-no-gi	賢所の儀	(1 – 3 May) Rituals by proxy to report to the sun goddess Amaterasu-ōmikami at the Kashiko-dokoro of the Three Palace Sanctuaries of the Imperial Palace that the accession to the throne has taken place.	Private	Kashiko-dokoro, Three Palace Sanctuaries, Tokyo Imperial Palace, Tokyo
1 May	Kōreiden-Shinden-ni-Hōkoku-no-gi	皇霊殿神殿に奉告の儀	Rituals by proxies to report to the Ancestral Spirits of the Imperial Family from one year after their death and the Amatsukami (天津神) from Takamagahara and Kunitsukami (国津神) from Japanese mythology at the Kōrei-den and Shin-den of the Three Palace Sanctuaries of the Imperial Palace respectively that the accession to the throne has taken place.	Private	Kōrei-den and Shin-den, Three Palace Sanctuaries, Tokyo Imperial Palace, Tokyo
4 May (rescheduled from 26 October)	Gosokui-Ippan-Sanga	御即位一般参賀	Event for Emperor Naruhito to receive congratulations from the general public after the accession to the throne has taken place.	Public	Chōwaden Reception Hall, Tokyo Imperial Palace, Tokyo
8 May	Kashikodokoro-ni-Kijitsu-Hōkoku-no-gi	賢所に期日奉告の儀	Emperor Naruhito reports the dates of the Enthronement Ceremony (即位の礼, Sokui-no-rei) and the Daijōsai (大嘗祭) to the sun goddess Amaterasu-ōmikami at the Kashiko-dokoro.	Private	Kashiko-dokoro, Three Palace Sanctuaries, Tokyo Imperial Palace, Tokyo
8 May	Kōreiden-Shinden-ni-Kijitsu-Hōkoku-no-gi	皇霊殿神殿に期日奉告の儀	Emperor Naruhito reports the dates of the Enthronement Ceremony (即位の礼, Sokui-no-rei) and the Daijōsai (大嘗祭) to the Ancestral Spirits of the Imperial Family from one year after their death and the Amatsukami (天津神) from Takamagahara and Kunitsukami (国津神) from Japanese mythology at the Kōrei-den and Shin-den respectively.	Private	Kashiko-dokoro, Three Palace Sanctuaries, Tokyo Imperial Palace, Tokyo
8 May	Jingū-Jinmu-Tennō-Sanryō-oyobi-Shōwa-Tennō-izen-Yondai-no-Tennō-Sanryō-ni-Chokushi-Hakken-no-gi	神宮神武天皇山陵及び昭和天皇以前四代の天皇山陵に勅使発遣の儀	Imperial messengers and priests are sent to the Ise Grand Shrine, the mausoleum of Emperor Jimmu, and the mausoleums of the 4 most recent late Emperors to report the dates of the Enthronement Ceremony (即位の礼, Sokui-no-rei) and the Daijōsai (大嘗祭).	Private	Imperial Residence, Tokyo Imperial Palace, Tokyo
10 May	Jingū-ni-Hōhei-no-gi	神宮に奉幣の儀	Imperial messengers and priests make offerings and report the dates of the Enthronement Ceremony (即位の礼, Sokui-no-rei) and the Daijōsai (大嘗祭) at the Ise Grand Shrine.	Private	Ise Grand Shrine, Ise, Mie Prefecture
10 May	Jinmu-Tennō-Sanryō-oyobi-Shōwa-Tennō-izen-Yondai-no-Tennō-Sanryō-ni-Hōhei-no-gi	神武天皇山陵及び昭和天 皇以前四代の天皇山陵に奉幣の儀	Imperial messengers and priests report the dates of the Enthronement Ceremony (即位の礼, Sokui-no-rei) and the Daijōsai (大嘗祭) to the mausoleum of Emperor Jimmu, and the mausoleums of the 4 most recent late Emperors.	Private	Unebi-yama no ushitora no sumi no misasagi (畝傍山東北陵), Kashihara, Nara Prefecture (Emperor Jimmu) Musashino no Misasagi (武藏野陵), Musashi Imperial Graveyard, Hachiōji, Tokyo (Emperor Shōwa); Tama no Misasagi (多摩陵), Musashi Imperial Graveyard, Hachiōji, Tokyo (Emperor Taishō); Fushimi Momoyama no Misasagi (伏見桃山陵), Fushimi-ku, Kyoto, Kyoto Prefecture (Emperor Meiji); Nochi no tsuki no wa no misasagi (後月輪東山陵), Higashiyama-ku, Kyoto, Kyoto Prefecture (Emperor Kōmei)
13 May	Saiden-Tentei-no-gi	斎田点定の儀	Ceremony to select one Prefecture each from both the Yuki (悠紀; "East Region", traditionally East of Kyoto) and the Suki (主基; "Western Region", traditionally West of Kyoto) regions, where the rice from the Saiden (斎田; "rice field") to be used for the Daijōsai (大嘗祭) is designated.	Private	Shin-den, Three Palace Sanctuaries, Tokyo Imperial Palace, Tokyo
26 July	Daijōkyū-Jichinsai	大嘗宮地鎮祭	(Minor Rites) Ceremony to purify the land where the temporary Daijōkyū Halls (大嘗宮) for the Daijōsai (大嘗祭) will be built.	Private	East Gardens of the Imperial Palace, Tokyo Imperial Palace, Tokyo
26 September	Saiden-Nukiho-zen-Ichinichi-Ōharai	斎田抜穂前一日大祓	(Minor Rites) Ceremony to purify the souls of the Imperial envoys and those who harvest the rice held the day before harvest.	Private	Kinugawa River (鬼怒川), Takanezawa, Tochigi Prefecture and Ōigawa River (大堰川), Nantan, Kyoto Prefecture
27 September	Saiden-Nukiho-no-gi	斎田抜穂の儀	Ceremony to harvest the rice at the two Saiden (斎田).	Private	Saiden of Takanezawa, Tochigi Prefecture and Saiden of Nantan, Kyoto Prefecture
15 October	Yuki-Suki-Ryō-Chihō-Shinkoku-Kyōno	悠紀主基両地方新穀供納	Ceremony to deliver the harvested rice from Saiden (斎田) at the Yuki (悠紀) and the Suki (主基) regions.	Private	Tokyo Imperial Palace, Tokyo
22 October	Sokuirei-Tōjitsu-Kashikodokoro-Ōmae-no-gi	即位礼当日賢所大前の儀	Emperor Naruhito reports the conduct of the Enthronement Ceremony to the sun goddess Amaterasu-ōmikami at the Kashiko-dokoro.	Private	Kashiko-dokoro, Three Palace Sanctuaries, Tokyo Imperial Palace, Tokyo
22 October	Sokuirei-Tōjitsu-Kōreiden-Shinden-ni-Hōkoku-no-gi	即位礼当日皇霊殿神殿に奉告の儀	Emperor Naruhito reports the conduct of the Enthronement Ceremony to the Ancestral Spirits of the Imperial Family from one year after their death and the Amatsukami (天津神) from Takamagahara and Kunitsukami (国津神) from Japanese mythology at the Kōrei-den and Shin-den respectively.	Private	Kōrei-den and Shin-den, Three Palace Sanctuaries, Tokyo Imperial Palace, Tokyo
22 October	Sokuirei-Seiden-no-gi	即位礼正殿の儀	Emperor Naruhito proclaims his enthronement and receives felicitations from representatives of the people from at home and abroad at the Seiden (正殿; "State Hall").	Public	Seiden (正殿), Tokyo Imperial Palace, Tokyo
22 October	Kyōen-no-gi	饗宴の儀	(22, 25, 29, 31 October) Court banquets to celebrate the enthronement and receive congratulations from guests.	Public	Tokyo Imperial Palace, Tokyo
23 October	Naikaku-Sōridaijin-Fusai-Shusai-Bansankai	内閣総理大臣夫妻主催晩餐会	State banquet for foreign heads of state, royals, heads of government, representatives and government officials.	Public	Hotel New Otani, Kioi, Chiyoda, Tokyo
8 November	Jingū-ni-Chokushi-Hakken-no-gi	神宮に勅使発遣の儀	Imperial messengers and priests are sent to the Ise Grand Shrine to make offerings and report that the Daijōsai (大嘗祭) will be taking place.	Private	Imperial Residence, Tokyo Imperial Palace, Tokyo
10 November (rescheduled from 22 October)	Shukuga-Onretsu-no-gi	祝賀御列の儀	Procession to show and receive good wishes from the people by motor car.	Public	Tokyo Imperial Palace, Tokyo, to Akasaka Imperial Grounds (赤坂御用地), Moto-Akasaka, Minato, Tokyo
12 November	Daijōsai-zen-Futsuka-Gokei	大嘗祭前二日御禊	(Minor Rites) Ceremony to purify the souls of the Emperor and Empress held two days before the Daijōsai (大嘗祭).	Private	Tokyo Imperial Palace, Tokyo
12 November	Daijōsai-zen-Futsuka-Ōharai	大嘗祭前二日大祓	(Minor Rites) Ceremony to purify the souls of the members of the Imperial Family and those concerned held two days before the Daijōsai (大嘗祭).	Private	Tokyo Imperial Palace, Tokyo
13 November	Daijōsai-zen-Ichinichi-Chinkon-no-gi	大嘗祭前一日鎮魂の儀	Ceremony to pray for the peace and safety of the Emperor and those concerned so that all the ceremonies related to the Daijōsai (大嘗祭) will be carried out smoothly and safely held one day before the said ceremony.	Private	Tokyo Imperial Palace, Tokyo
13 November	Daijōsai-zen-Ichinichi-Daijōkyū-Chinsai	大嘗祭前一日大嘗宮鎮祭	Ceremony to pray for the peace of the Daijōkyū Halls (大嘗宮) held one day before the said ceremony.	Private	East Gardens of the Imperial Palace, Tokyo Imperial Palace, Tokyo
14 November	Daijōsai-Tōjitsu-Jingū-ni-Hōhei-no-gi	大嘗祭当日神宮に奉幣の儀	Imperial messengers and priests make offerings and report that the Daijōsai (大嘗祭) is taking place at the East Gardens of the Imperial Palace at the Ise Grand Shrine.	Private	Ise Grand Shrine, Ise, Mie Prefecture
14 November	Daijōsai-Tōjitsu-Kashikodokoro-Omike-Kyōshin-no-gi	大嘗祭当日賢所大御饌供進の儀	Rituals by proxy to report to the sun goddess Amaterasu-ōmikami at the Kashiko-dokoro that the Daijōsai (大嘗祭) is to take place and to make divine oblation.	Private	Kashiko-dokoro, Three Palace Sanctuaries, Tokyo Imperial Palace, Tokyo
14 November	Daijōsai-Tōjitsu-Kōreiden-Shinden-ni-Hōkoku-no-gi	大嘗祭当日皇霊殿神殿に奉告の儀	Rituals by proxy to report to the Ancestral Spirits of the Imperial Family from one year after their death and the Amatsukami (天津神) from Takamagahara and Kunitsukami (国津神) from Japanese mythology that the Daijōsai (大嘗祭) is to take place.	Private	Kōrei-den and Shin-den, Three Palace Sanctuaries, Tokyo Imperial Palace, Tokyo
14 November	Daijōkyū-no-gi (Yukiden-Kyōsen-no-gi, Sukiden-Kyōsen-no-gi)	大嘗宮の儀 （悠紀殿供饌の儀・主基殿供饌の儀）	The Emperor makes an offering of the rice, the sake made from this rice, millet, fish and a variety of other foods to the sun goddess Amaterasu-ōmikami and to the Amatsukami (天津神) from Takamagahara and Kunitsukami (国津神) from Japanese mythology at both the Yuki (悠紀) halls (14 November) and the Suki (主基) halls (15 November) of the Daijōkyū Halls (大嘗宮) and partakes of it himself, giving thanks and praying for peace and abundant harvests for the country and for the Japanese people.	Private	East Gardens of the Imperial Palace, Tokyo Imperial Palace, Tokyo
16 November	Daijōsai-go-Ichinichi-Daijōkyū-Chinsai	大嘗祭後一日大嘗宮鎮祭	Ceremony to express appreciation for the peace of the Daijōkyū Halls (大嘗宮) held on the day following the Daijōsai (大嘗祭).	Private	East Gardens of the Imperial Palace, Tokyo Imperial Palace, Tokyo
16 November	Daikyō-no-gi	大饗の儀	(16, 18 November) Imperial feasts in which the Emperor offers white sake, black sake and a relish to those present and all partake together.	Private	Tokyo Imperial Palace, Tokyo
22 November	Sokuirei-oyobi-Daijōsai-go-Jingū-ni-Shin'etsu-no-gi	即位礼及び大嘗祭後神宮に親謁の儀	(22, 23 November) The Emperor and Empress pay respects at the Ise Grand Shrine after the Enthronement Ceremony and the Daijōsai (大嘗祭).	Private	Ise Grand Shrine, Ise, Mie Prefecture
27 November	Sokuirei-oyobi-Daijōsai-go-Jinmu-Tennō-Sanryō-oyobi-Shōwa-Tennō-izen-Yondai-no-Tennō-Sanryō-ni-Shin'etsu-no-gi	即位礼及び大嘗祭後神宮に親謁の儀	(27, 28 November, 3 December) The Emperor and Empress pay respects at the mausoleum of Emperor Jimmu, and the mausoleums of the 4 most recent late Emperors after the Enthronement Ceremony and the Daijōsai (大嘗祭).	Private	Unebi-yama no ushitora no sumi no misasagi (畝傍山東北陵), Kashihara, Nara Prefecture (Emperor Jimmu) Musashino no Misasagi (武藏野陵), Musashi Imperial Graveyard, Hachiōji, Tokyo (Emperor Shōwa); Tama no Misasagi (多摩陵), Musashi Imperial Graveyard, Hachiōji, Tokyo (Emperor Taishō); Fushimi Momoyama no Misasagi (伏見桃山陵), Fushimi-ku, Kyoto, Kyoto Prefecture (Emperor Meiji); Nochi no tsuki no wa no misasagi (後月輪東山陵), Higashiyama-ku, Kyoto, Kyoto Prefecture (Emperor Kōmei)
28 November	Chakai	茶会	Reception held during the Emperor's visit to Kyoto for representatives of various circles in the Kinki area which has close ties with the Imperial Family since ancient times held after the Enthronement Ceremony and the Daijōsai (大嘗祭).	Private	Kyoto Imperial Palace, Kyōtogyoen, Kamigyō-ku, Kyoto
4 December	Sokuirei-oyobi-Daijōsai-go-Kashikodokoro-ni-Shin'etsu-no-gi	即位礼及び大嘗祭後賢所に親謁の儀	The Emperor pays respects to the sun goddess Amaterasu-ōmikami at the Kashiko-dokoro after the Enthronement Ceremony and the Daijōsai (大嘗祭).	Private	Kashiko-dokoro, Three Palace Sanctuaries, Tokyo Imperial Palace, Tokyo
4 December	Sokuirei-oyobi-Daijōsai-go-Kōreiden-Shinden-ni-Shin'etsu-no-gi	即位礼及び大嘗祭後皇霊殿神殿に親謁の儀	The Emperor pays respects to the Ancestral Spirits of the Imperial Family from one year after their death and the Amatsukami (天津神) from Takamagahara and Kunitsukami (国津神) from Japanese mythology at the Kōrei-den and Shin-den respectively after the Enthronement Ceremony and the Daijōsai (大嘗祭).	Private	Kōrei-den and Shin-den, Three Palace Sanctuaries, Tokyo Imperial Palace, Tokyo
4 December	Sokuirei-oyobi-Daijōsai-go-Kashikodokoro-Mikagura-no-gi	即位礼及び大嘗祭後賢所御神楽の儀	Ceremonial performance of Mi-kagura (ritual music and dance) after the Enthronement Ceremony and the Daijōsai (大嘗祭).	Private	Kashiko-dokoro, Three Palace Sanctuaries, Tokyo Imperial Palace, Tokyo
After removal	Daijōsai-go-Daijōkyū-Jichinsai	大嘗祭後大嘗宮地鎮祭	(Minor Rites) Ceremony to purify the land of the Daijōkyū Halls (大嘗宮) after they have been dismantled.	Private	East Gardens of the Tokyo Imperial Palace, Tokyo
2020
8 November, 10:55 Tokyo time (rescheduled from 19 April)	Rikkōshi-Senmei-no-gi	立皇嗣宣明の儀	Ceremony to proclaim Prince Akishino as Kōshi (皇嗣) (a rank equivalent to Crown Prince) and receives felicitations from representatives of the people from at home and abroad at the Imperial Palace.	Public	Tokyo Imperial Palace, Tokyo
8 November, 10:55 Tokyo time (rescheduled from 19 April)	Chōken-no-gi	朝見の儀	Ceremony for the Emperor and Empress to meet the Crown Prince for the first time after the proclamation ceremony.	Public	Tokyo Imperial Palace, Tokyo

== See also ==
- Chrysanthemum taboo
- Daijō Tennō (retired Emperor)
- Enthronement of the Japanese emperor
- Imperial House of Japan
- Japanese era name
- List of emperors of Japan
