= Reserve judge =

A reserve judge is a former judge or, on occasion, an appointed official who offers their services as a substitute judge when required. Reserve judges either supplement judges in jurisdictions that do not have the number of judges needed, or act as an alternate judge in jurisdictions with a single judge when that judge is substituted or must recuse himself. Reserve judges may also be used as substitutes when another judge is ill or on vacation.

A reserve judge is distinguished from a commissioner in that a reserve judge is meant for intermittent, temporary work only, not as a permanent solution. Reserve judges may handle any cases a normal judge can handle, whereas commissioners are more limited in their authority.

== See also ==
- Courts
- Judiciary
- Justice
