= Japanese calendar era bug =

Computer bug

The Japanese calendar era bug is a possible computer bug related to the change of the Japanese era name.

== Background ==
The Japanese calendar has era names that change with the reign of the Japanese emperor. As much of the initial rise of modern computing occurred during the Heisei era (1989–2019), most software had only supported that era.

A new era name was expected with the 2019 Japanese imperial transition. However, since the change of eras is infrequent, most software had not been tested to ensure that it would behave correctly with an additional era. To ensure that the new era would be handled correctly, some systems were provided test mechanisms to simulate a new era ahead of time.

In early April 2019, the new era name was announced to be Reiwa for "beautiful harmony."

== Documented errors ==
Some minor problems have been reported due to improper handling of the era transition.

- In 2019, ATMs placed inside the Lawson chain of konbini improperly reported that deposited funds would not be available until May 7, 1989, due to a date conversion using Heisei 1 (1989) instead of Reiwa 1 (2019).

== Fixes ==
- Windows 10 version 1803 included a registry entry with placeholder information for the expected era transition, intended to help users discover any software limitations around the expected change to the new era.
- macOS Mojave 10.14.5 and iOS 12.3 included support for the Reiwa era.
- Unicode code point U+32FF was reserved in September 2018 for representing the new era name, and Unicode 12.1 included U+32FF ㋿ SQUARE ERA NAME REIWA.
- The GNU C Library was updated to include the new era name in the 2.30 release.

== See also ==
- Time formatting and storage bugs
- 2019 Japanese imperial transition
