= Williams v. North Carolina (1945) =

- Supreme Court of the United States

Argued October 13, 1944 Decided May 21, 1945
- Full case name: Williams, et al. v. State of North Carolina
- Citations: 325 U.S. 226 (more) 65 S. Ct. 1092; 89 L. Ed. 1577

Case history
- Prior: State v. Williams et al., 224 N.C. 183, 29 S.E.2d 744 (1944).
- Subsequent: Rehearing denied, 325 U.S. 895

Court membership
- Chief Justice Harlan F. Stone Associate Justices Owen Roberts · Hugo Black; Stanley F. Reed · Felix Frankfurter; William O. Douglas · Frank Murphy; Robert H. Jackson · Wiley B. Rutledge

Case opinions
- Majority: Frankfruter
- Concurrence: Frankfurter
- Dissent: Rutledge
- Dissent: Black, joined by Douglas

Williams v. North Carolina, 325 U.S. 226 (1945), is a United States Supreme Court case in which the Court held that a divorce decree granted by Nevada was not entitled to full faith and credit in North Carolina because the Nevada court lacked jurisdiction over the parties. It was a follow-up to the Supreme Court's decision in Williams v. North Carolina (1942). The Williams cases are part of a long line of Supreme Court decisions grappling with issues of divorce jurisdiction and full faith and credit in a federal system. The ability of states to reexamine divorce decrees from other states on jurisdictional grounds was later limited by cases such as Sherrer v. Sherrer (1948) and Johnson v. Muelberger (1951), at least where the defendant spouse had participated in the divorce proceedings.

== Background ==
This case was a continuation of the issues presented in the earlier case of Williams v. North Carolina (1942). In the original case, O.B. Williams and Lillie Hendrix, both residents of North Carolina, had traveled to Nevada, obtained divorces from their respective spouses, and then married each other. Upon returning to North Carolina, they were prosecuted for bigamous cohabitation. The Supreme Court of North Carolina affirmed the conviction and found their divorces invalid, stating that North Carolina was not required to recognize the Nevada decrees under the Full Faith and Credit Clause. The U.S. Supreme Court reversed the convictions, holding that North Carolina must respect the divorce decrees if Nevada had jurisdiction. However, it left open the question of whether North Carolina could challenge Nevada's finding of domicile. In this second case, Williams and Hendrix were again prosecuted in North Carolina for bigamous cohabitation. This time, however, the State of North Carolina argued that Williams and Hendrix had never validly established domicile in Nevada, and thus the Nevada court lacked jurisdiction to grant the divorces.

== Opinion of the Court ==
In a 6–3 decision, the Supreme Court affirmed the convictions for bigamy. The majority opinion was written by Justice Felix Frankfurter.

The Court held that North Carolina was not required to give full faith and credit to the Nevada divorce decrees if the Nevada court did not have jurisdiction over the parties. Domicile is necessary to give a court jurisdiction to grant a divorce, and the jury in North Carolina had permissibly found that Williams and Hendrix were not domiciled in Nevada at the time of their divorces. While a state must give full faith and credit to the judgments of sister states, it can inquire into whether the sister state had jurisdiction to render the judgment in the first place.

== Dissents ==
Justice Rutledge argued that the decision effectively allows states to disregard the Full Faith and Credit Clause and that domicile should be abandoned as a jurisdictional requirement for divorce. Justice Black argued the decision undermines the finality and decisiveness of uncontested divorce decrees. "It is an extraordinary thing for a state to procure a retroactive invalidation of a divorce decree, and then punish one of its citizens for conduct authorized by that decree, when it had never been challenged by either of the people most immediately interested in it."
