= List of United States Supreme Court cases, volume 325 =

This is a list of all the United States Supreme Court cases from volume 325 of the United States Reports:

Case name	Citation	Date decided
Cramer v. United States	325 U.S. 1	1945
Herb v. Pitcairn	325 U.S. 77	1945
Hoover Co. v. Coe	325 U.S. 79	1945
Screws v. United States	325 U.S. 91	1945
Jewell Ridge Coal Corp. v. United Mine Workers of America	325 U.S. 161	1945
United States Alkali Export Ass'n, Inc. v. United States	325 U.S. 196	1945
De Beers Consol. Mines, Ltd. v. United States	325 U.S. 212	1945
Williams v. North Carolina (1945)	325 U.S. 226	1945
Esenwein v. Commonwealth ex rel. Esenwein	325 U.S. 279	1945
IRS v. Estate of Bedford	325 U.S. 283	1945
Angelus Milling Co. v. Commissioner	325 U.S. 293	1945
Finn v. Meighan	325 U.S. 300	1945
Chase Sec. Corp. v. Donaldson	325 U.S. 304	1945
Ambassador, Inc. v. United States	325 U.S. 317	1945
Sinclair & Carroll Co. v. Interchemical Corp.	325 U.S. 327	1945
Mine Workers v. Eagle-Picher Mining & Smelting Co.	325 U.S. 335	1945
United States v. Capital Transit Co.	325 U.S. 357	1945
Trust of Bingham v. IRS	325 U.S. 365	1945
American Power & Light Co. v. SEC	325 U.S. 385	1945
Akins v. Texas	325 U.S. 398	1945
Bowles v. Seminole Rock & Sand Co.	325 U.S. 410	1945
Walling v. Youngerman-Reynolds Hardwood Co.	325 U.S. 419	1945
Walling v. Harnischfeger Corp.	325 U.S. 427	1945
Commissioner v. Disston	325 U.S. 442	1945
Alabama State Federation of Labor v. McAdory	325 U.S. 450	1945
CIO v. McAdory	325 U.S. 472	1945
Keegan v. United States	325 U.S. 478	1945
North Carolina v. United States	325 U.S. 507	1945
Alabama v. United States	325 U.S. 535	1945
Hill v. Florida ex rel. Watson	325 U.S. 538	1945
In re Summers	325 U.S. 561	1945
10 E. 40th St. Bldg., Inc. v. Callus	325 U.S. 578	1945
Nebraska v. Wyoming	325 U.S. 589	1945
Lincoln Nat'l Life Ins. Co. v. Read	325 U.S. 673	1945
Borden Co. v. Borella	325 U.S. 679	1945
Goldstone v. United States	325 U.S. 687	1945
Lumber & Sawmill Workers v. Millis	325 U.S. 697	1945
Elgin J. & E.R.R. Co. v. Burley	325 U.S. 711	1945
Southern Pacific Company v. Arizona	325 U.S. 761	1945
Allen Bradley Co. v. Electrical Workers	325 U.S. 797	1945
Hunt v. Crumboch	325 U.S. 821	1945
