= List of United States Supreme Court cases, volume 317 =

This is a list of all the United States Supreme Court cases from volume 317 of the United States Reports:

Case name	Citation	Date decided
Ex parte Quirin	317 U.S. 1	1942
Braverman v. United States	317 U.S. 49	1942
United States v. Callahan Walker Construction Company	317 U.S. 56	1942
United States v. Rice	317 U.S. 61	1942
Ex parte Kawato	317 U.S. 69	1942
Marine Harbor Properties, Inc. v. Manufacturers Trust Company	317 U.S. 78	1942
Warren-Bradshaw Drilling Company v. Hall	317 U.S. 88	1942
Riggs v. Del Drago	317 U.S. 95	1942
Internal Revenue Service v. Ohio Leather Company	317 U.S. 102	1942
Wickard v. Filburn	317 U.S. 111	1942
Hughes v. Wendel	317 U.S. 134	1942
State Bank v. Brown	317 U.S. 135	1942
Pfister v. Northern Illinois Finance Corporation	317 U.S. 144	1942
Internal Revenue Service v. Stuart	317 U.S. 154	1942
Sola Electric Company v. Jefferson Electric Company	317 U.S. 173	1942
Mangus v. Miller	317 U.S. 178	1942
Ettelson v. Metropolitan Life Insurance Company	317 U.S. 188	1942
Miller v. United States (1942)	317 U.S. 192	1942
United States v. Wayne Pump Company	317 U.S. 200	1942
Albin v. Cowing Pressure Relieving Joint Company	317 U.S. 211	1942
Pyle v. Kansas	317 U.S. 213	1942
Fisher v. Whiton	317 U.S. 217	1942
Mother Lode Coalition Mines Company v. Commissioner	317 U.S. 222	1942
United Carbon Company v. Binney and Smith Company	317 U.S. 228	1942
Sharpe v. Buchanan	317 U.S. 238	1942
Garrett v. Moore-McCormack Company	317 U.S. 239	1942
Davis v. Department of Labor	317 U.S. 249	1942
Department of Banking v. Pink	317 U.S. 264	1942
Adams v. United States ex rel. McCann	317 U.S. 269	1942
Williams v. North Carolina (1942)	317 U.S. 287	1942
Wragg v. Federal Land Bank	317 U.S. 325	1943
Detroit Bank v. United States	317 U.S. 329	1943
Michigan v. United States	317 U.S. 338	1943
Parker v. Brown	317 U.S. 341	1943
United States v. Miller (1943)	317 U.S. 369	1943
Marshall v. Pletz	317 U.S. 383	1943
The Eglantine	317 U.S. 395	1943
Kieselbach v. Internal Revenue Service	317 U.S. 399	1943
Coryell v. Phipps	317 U.S. 406	1943
Pendergast v. United States	317 U.S. 412	1943
National Milk Products Association v. City of San Francisco	317 U.S. 423	1943
United States v. Monia	317 U.S. 424	1943
Harris v. Zion's Savings Bank and Trust Company	317 U.S. 447	1943
Public Utilities Commission v. United Fuel Gas Company	317 U.S. 456	1943
Harrison v. N. Trust Company	317 U.S. 476	1943
Lilly v. Grand Trunk Western Railroad Company	317 U.S. 481	1943
Spies v. United States	317 U.S. 492	1943
Endicott Johnson Corporation v. Perkins	317 U.S. 501	1943
Holley v. Lawrence	317 U.S. 518	1943
American Medical Association v. United States	317 U.S. 519	1943
United States ex rel. Marcus v. Hess	317 U.S. 537	1943
United States ex rel. Ostrager v. Associated General Contractors, Inc.	317 U.S. 562	1943
Walling v. Jacksonville Paper Company	317 U.S. 564	1943
Higgins v. Carr Brothers Company	317 U.S. 572	1943
Brady v. Roosevelt Steamship Company	317 U.S. 575	1943
