= Tennessee Coal, Iron & Railroad Co. v. Muscoda Local No. 123 =

- Supreme Court of the United States

Argued January 13–14, 1944 Decided March 27, 1944
- Full case name: Tennessee Coal, Iron & Railroad Co. et al. v. Muscoda Local No. 123 et al.
- Citations: 321 U.S. 590 (more) 64 S. Ct. 698; 88 L. Ed. 949; 1944 U.S. LEXIS 1313

Case history
- Prior: 40 F. Supp. 4 (N.D. Ala. 1941); affirmed, 135 F.2d 320 (5th Cir. 1943); cert. granted, 320 U.S. 731 (1943).

Holding
- The miners' travel time constituted "work" under the Fair Labor Standards Act, entitling them to pay for such time.

Court membership
- Chief Justice Harlan F. Stone Associate Justices Owen Roberts · Hugo Black; Stanley F. Reed · Felix Frankfurter; William O. Douglas · Frank Murphy; Robert H. Jackson · Wiley B. Rutledge

Case opinions
- Majority: Murphy, joined by Black, Douglas, Reed, Frankfurter, Jackson, Rutledge
- Concurrence: Frankfurter
- Concurrence: Jackson
- Dissent: Roberts, joined by Stone

Laws applied
- Fair Labor Standards Act

Tennessee Coal, Iron & Railroad Co. v. Muscoda Local No. 123, 321 U.S. 590 (1944), was an important decision of the United States Supreme Court with regard to the interpretation of the Fair Labor Standards Act (FLSA). This set a precedent for an expansive construction of the language of the FLSA.

== Facts ==
Three iron ore companies filed a declarative action to determine whether time spent by their employees traveling underground to their work sites constituted employment for which compensation was due under the FLSA. The district court found that this transit time was work, and the appellate court affirmed its holding as to travel time.

== Judgment ==
The Court, in an opinion written by Justice Murphy, held that the miners' travel time constituted "work" under the Fair Labor Standards Act, entitling them to pay for such time. The Court stated that the Fair Labor Standards Act is a “remedial and humanitarian” statute, which “must not be interpreted or applied in a narrow, grudging manner.” Congress intended the Act to mandate either regular or overtime compensation for all work activities.

=== Concurring opinions ===
Justices Jackson and Frankfurter each wrote a short concurrence. Both argued that the determination of the trial court that the miners' travel time was part of their workweek was an issue of fact that should be affirmed unless clear error was present.

=== Dissenting opinion ===
Justice Roberts dissented in an opinion joined by Chief Justice Stone. Viewing the court's interpretation of the FLSA as overly expansive, Justice Roberts emphasized the importance of interpreting what is written in a statute, rather than what the court wishes is in the statute.

== See also ==
- Fair Labor Standards Act
- Jewell Ridge Coal Corp. v. United Mine Workers of America
- List of United States Supreme Court cases, volume 321
- List of United States Supreme Court cases by the Stone Court
