= Substitution (law) =

In legal terms, the right of substitution is a statutory right of all parties except the state. It is the right to change the presiding court official with or without cause.

Judges are usually given cases randomly within a jurisdiction (unless there is only one judge in a jurisdiction, in which case they receive all cases). The right of substitution does not give a litigant the right to choose a judge, just the random selection of another judge in the jurisdiction. If the right is exercised in a jurisdiction with one judge usually a judge from a neighboring jurisdiction will take the case, although on occasion a Reserve Judge or Commissioner may be used.

== Right of substitution with cause ==
The right of substitution, where applicable, may be exercised by criminal and juvenile defendants and all parties in a civil action. Substitution for cause can be for any bias a judge may have in the case, such as an association with a party (family, friendship or even stock ownership), having made vocal comments in the past on the topic at trial, etc.

The right of substitution with cause does not have a limitation on the number of times it may be called for, such that parties may exercise the right until they find a neutral judge. Substitution with cause may be moved for at any time after a party realizes a bias exists. However many jurisdictions require the right be exercised within a certain time after the bias has been discovered by a party or else the right will be waived, often 30–60 days.

This right rarely must be exercised by parties, as judges will usually raise the bias sua sponte and recuse him or herself from a case before a party may even have known of the conflict of interest.

== Right of substitution without cause ==
The right of substitution without cause is only applicable in some US States and not in the federal court system. It is uncommon outside the United States. This right may only be used once per case whereas the right of substitution for cause may be used until a neutral judge can be found.

Substitution without cause must be moved for prior to the first order by a judge. It can therefore be moved for in civil court after complaints and answers have been filed but prior to the first order, often a scheduling order for discovery procedure. In criminal or juvenile courts the right may be exercised after arraignment or indictment but before a preliminary hearing. Sometimes the motion must be made a certain number of days before the "prelim" or scheduling order is held.
