= Ritual ceremonies of the Imperial Palace =

Japanese royal rituals

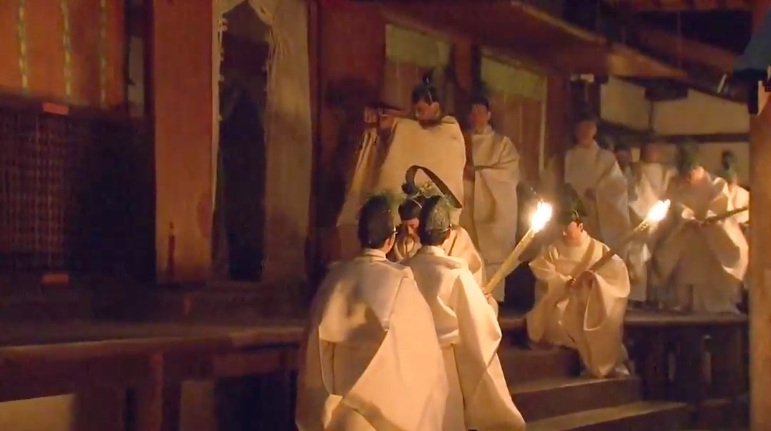
Niiname-no-Matsuri

Japanese Court rituals lit. Court rituals (宮中祭祀, Kyūchū saishi; kana: きゅうちゅうさいし) are rituals performed by the Emperor of Japan for the purpose of praying for the nation and its people's peace and prosperity. Rituals are held at the Tokyo Imperial Palace and the Three Palace Sanctuaries and include the 'Grand Service' in which the emperor himself performs the rituals and delivers the imperial proclamation, and the Minor Service in which the chief priests (shosokuji) and others perform the rituals and the emperor pays homage. The other is the Minor Festival in which the chief priests (shosoten-ji) conduct the ceremony and the emperor pays his respects.

== History ==
=== Heian period ===
Since the establishment of the Ritsuryo system, the formalization of rituals has progressed, and is summarized in the Engishiki. This is a list of various rituals, and does not take the form of a list of court rituals alone.

Disasters such as disease, epidemic, earthquake, fire, and other natural disasters were thought to be caused by god's possession, and were compared to Oni or feared as a god of plague.

The divinities officer was in charge of the divinities rituals and was not under the jurisdiction of the Onmyodo dormitory. Various rituals are said to have been held, including the Plague God Festival, Chinka Festival, Wind God Festival, Great Purification, Miyagi Four Corners Plague God Festival, Fire Prevention Festival, and Hotarubetsu Festival.、Onmyodo-do was developed in sorcery style based on the aristocratic society of the Heian period, and included Onmyodo elements in the Shinto rituals of the Ritsuryo system.

The four corners of the capital were bounded (sacred and secular areas), and rituals were held at the four corners of the capital and the four corners of the Miyagi Castle to pray for the safety and peace of the world. The Onmyōji persecution by Toyotomi Hideyoshi began, driving Onmyōji who made their living as prayers and divinations to the provinces, and they quickly lost power, and people calling themselves Onmyōji, which was far greater than the number of official Onmyōji in Onmyō. Rituals at the palace took on a more Shinto coloring. ryō at the time, flowed throughout the country. During the Sengoku era Persecution, even the Tsuchimikado family lost many of their Onmyōdō traditions and ritual implements. The Altar of the Taizanfukunsai, the most important "Great Law" of Onmyōdō, was also lost, and the ritual instruments were borrowed from the Yoshida Shrine in Kyoto for the ground-breaking ceremony of the Imperial Palace. This had a significant impact on the Rituals at the palace took on a more Shinto coloring.。On the other hand, Onmyodo path was authorized by the Tokugawa shogunate, and was converted to Shinto by Yasufuku Tsuchimikado as Tensha Shinto under the influence of Taruka Shinto.

=== Before modern times ===
As Emperor Juntoku of the Kamakura period stated in "Shinto ritual " in "Shinto ritual", the emperor has given "Shinto ritual" the highest priority since Hagoku. Four-way worship is an event that has been handed down to successive emperors since before the Edo period.

In the middle and late Edo period there was a growing theory of sonnō based on Mitogaku, and the revival of rituals such as the Niiname -no-Matsuri became popular.

=== From the Meiji era to the prewar period ===
Many of the rituals held today were reorganized during the Meiji Restoration, inheriting the Taiho Code, the Sadakan Ceremony, and the Engi Ceremony.

Along with the deification of the emperor as the " current god " and the separation of Shinto and Buddhism, the rituals that had been cut off were reconstructed and new rituals were created. In 1871 ( Meiji 4), a Daijo-kan's decree stating that "a shrine is a national ritual" was issued, and in 1908, the imperial ritual decree stipulating the court ritual was enacted as one of the imperial decree.

Rice cultivation is carried out in the rice fields in Miyagi, and after Emperor ShowaHe began to plant rice. The harvested rice is used as an offering during rituals.

=== Postwar ===
After the defeat of Japan in 1945 and under the postwar rule of the Allied Command, the Imperial Household Agency. The former Imperial Household Law, which had been separated from the national government, was abolished when the Constitution of Japan came into effect, and the fully revised Imperial Household Law became a general law.

In conjunction with this, the prewar Imperial Household Ordinances, such as the Imperial Rituals Ordinance, were all abolished at one time, but the Imperial Household Agency issued an internal circular confirming that "matters for which no new explicit provisions have been made shall be implemented in accordance with the former Imperial Household Ordinances.

== Position under the Constitution of Japan ==
There is no explicit provision for court rituals in the Constitution of Japan or its subordinate laws, and current court rituals are conducted in accordance with the Imperial Household Rituals Ordinance. The budget for this is also handled by the Imperial Household's internal expenses. For this reason, some constitutional scholars have interpreted postwar court rituals as "ceremonies performed privately by the emperor.

The official website of the Imperial Household Agency explains the court ritual in the section "Public affairs of the Imperial Household Agency"。

In addition the prime minister and other heads of the three branches of government have been confirmed to attend some rituals, mainly the Grand Festival. Eisaku Sato attended most of the Spring Imperial Rei Festival and Spring Temple Festival, Autumn Imperial Rei Festival and Autumn Temple Festival, and the Shinmae Festival during his tenure as prime minister, and he also attended the NHK Special "The True Face of the Symbolic Emperors" (broadcast on 10 April 2009, a program commemorating the 50th anniversary of the marriage of the Emperor and Empress), showed footage of the then Prime Minister Taro Aso and other heads of the three powers attending the Spring Imperial Service and Spring Temple Service.

Since the establishment of the court ritual as an institution, Emperor Meiji and Emperor Taisho were not very enthusiastic, and the chamberlains were the main worshipers. On the other hand, Empress Teimei, Emperor Showa, and Empress Kojun were very enthusiastic.

It can be seen from the diary that Sukemasa Irie, who was a samurai servant in the latter half of his reign, promoted the simplification of rituals due to the aging of Emperor Showa in the 1965s and 1950s. Until 1986, he continued the parent festival of Niiname-no-Matsuri.

The 125th Emperor Akihito and Empress Michiko were also extremely enthusiastic about the ritual, and except for the darkness (in mourning) and illness, they worshiped most of the court rituals without making a substitute.

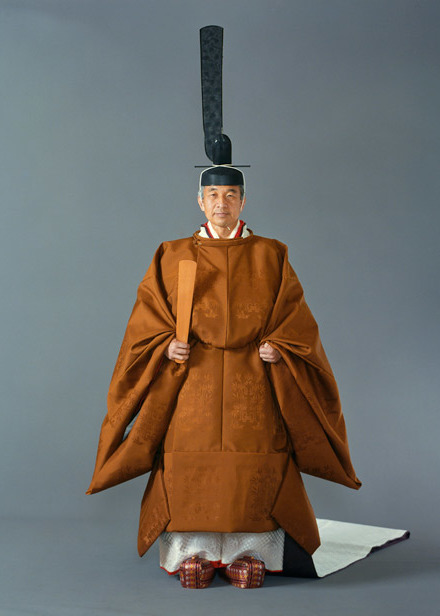
His Majesty the Emperor wearing a waxed robe (1990)

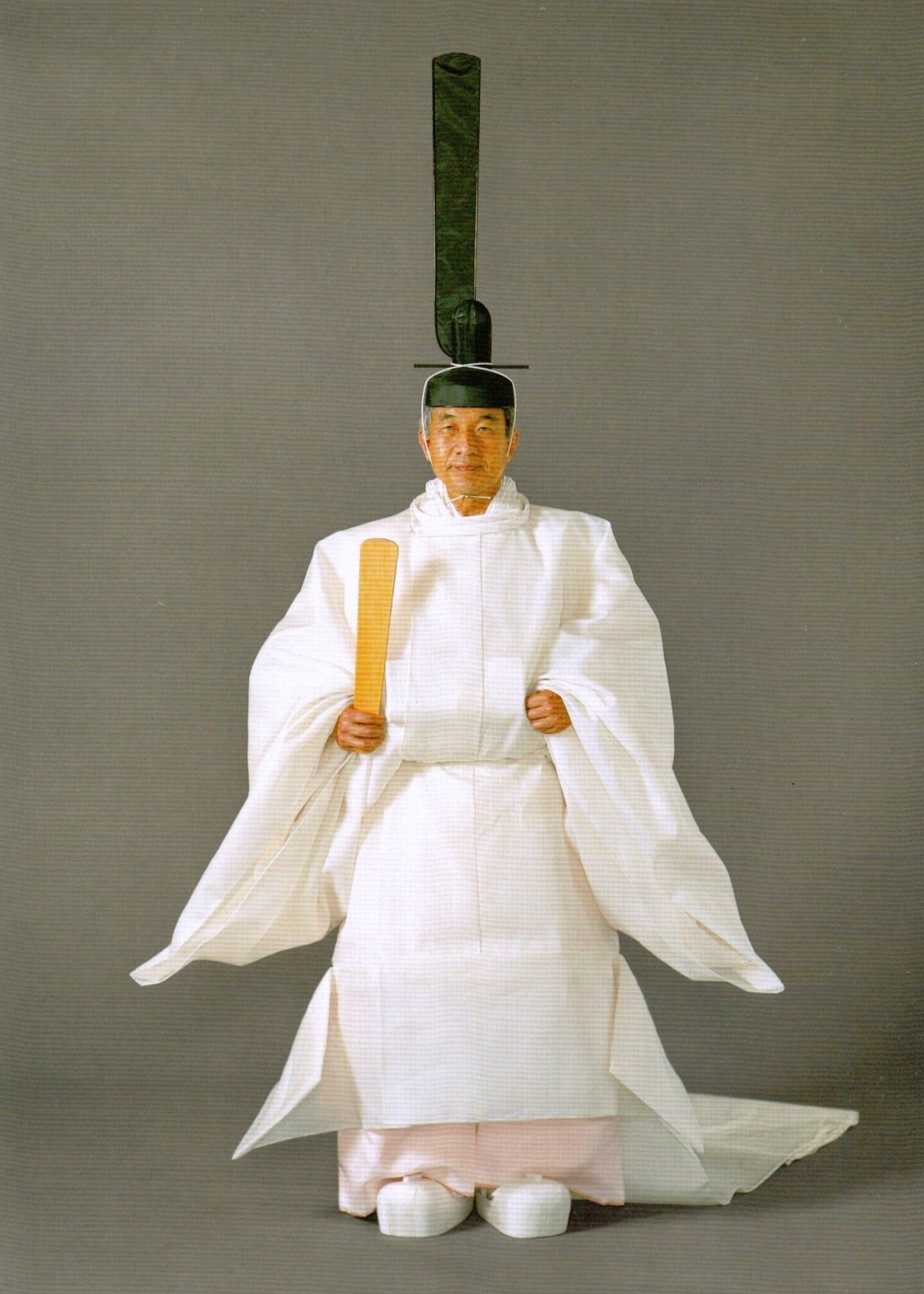
His Majesty the Emperor in ceremonial dress

Regarding rituals, in addition to calling Kiyosai and Heian shōzoku in advance, it is necessary to sit upright for a long time, and when the ritual approaches, Emperor Showa consciously sits upright for a long time, such as watching TV in the seiza. It is said that he was keeping that in mind. It was said that Akihito was practicing seiza as well as Emperor Showa when the time of the Niiname-no-Matsuri approached, but after 2009 (Heisei 21), 20 years after his reign, consideration for the health of elderly Akihito. To reduce the burden, simplification and adjustment of rituals were planned and implemented.

== Rituals ==
Those in bold are the major festivals.

- 1 January – Shihohai (四方拝, worship in the four directions), Saitansai (歳旦祭, New Year's Day festival)
- 3 January – **Festival of the Origin of the Imperial Line** (元始祭 Genshisai)
- 4 January – **Soujihajime** (奏事始, Issuing the order for the beginning of the Shinto ritual year at Jingū)
- 7 January – **Emperor Showa Festival**
- 30 January – **Emperor Komei Festival**
- 17 February – **Kinensai** (祈年祭, February festivity for ancestors and the winter harvest)
- 23 February – Tencho Festival
- Vernal Equinox Day – **Spring Kōreisai**, **Spring Shindensai**
- 3 April – **Jinmu-tennosai**, Kōreiden Mikagura
- 16 June – Empress Kōjun annual festival (Kōjun Kōgoreisai)
- 30 June – Yoori, Great Purification Ceremony
- 30 July – Emperor Meiji annual festival
- Autumnal Equinox Day – **Autumn Koreisai**, **Autumn Shindensai**
- 17 October – **Kanname-sai**
- 23 November – **Niinamesai** (Thanksgiving Festival of the Fall Harvest)
- Mid-December – Kashikodokoro Mikagura (Feast of the Shrine of the Goddess of Mercy/Winter Solstice Festival)
- 25 December – **Taisho-tenno-sai** (Emperor Taisho's Festival)
- 31 December – Yoori, Year-end Grand Purification

=== Difference from the previous Imperial ritual order ===
- 11 February – Abolition of **Kigensetsusai**.
  - However, even after the abolition, the same rituals are still held as "extraordinary worship" (臨時御拝).
- The name was changed from Tencho-setsu festival to Tencho-sai.
- The Shihohai, Sojihajime, Koreiden Mikagura, Yoori, and great purification are neither major nor minor festivals.

== Dress ==
Attendants are required to wear Morning coat and Afternoon dress in western style, and white-necked montsuki or similar in Japanese style. During the winter, cloaks may be worn.

== Ritual ceremonies of the imperial family ==
Ritual Ceremonies of the Imperial Palace describes various Rituals related to the Emperor (the Emperor and the Imperial Family). Of these, ceremonies related to the Emperor can be divided into two categories: national acts as stipulated in Article 7 of the Japanese Constitution, and official acts that do not fall under this category. These ritual performances also are strikingly similar to Hindu personal sacraments, called Samskara, they involve a bathing ceremony, naming ceremony, first outing and the wedding ceremony.

== Pregnancy-Birth ==
=== Onchakutai (御着帯) ===
A ceremony held on the day of the dog of the sexagenary cycle in the ninth month of pregnancy for female members of the Imperial Family who have conceived a child to pray for a safe delivery. In the case of Empress Masako, the Emperor presented her with a red and white silk sash (生平絹の帯 kinohiraginu no obi), which was then delivered to the expectant female royal family member by a palace official sent by the sash's parent, followed by a Gochaku Shinken no Gi. The sash is then taken to the Three Palace Sanctuaries by the head priest for substitute worship on behalf of the couple. The obi is offered to the temple at the end of each of the three halls, and a norito is said. This series of ceremonies is called Kashikodokoro Koureiden Shinden ni Chakutai Hokoku no Gi (賢所皇霊殿神殿に着帯奉告の儀). After the ceremony, the sash is delivered again by the attendant, and the crown prince in his morning clothes ties the sash on the princess, who is dressed in uchigi (court dress robe) and hakama, with the help of the lady-in-waiting. In addition, in the fifth month of pregnancy, naionchakutai (内御着帯) is performed, however it is not a formal ceremony. In the case of the Crown Princess, she wears a very light indigo uchigi and a bright scarlet hakama, and the Chief of the Household of the Crown Prince (東宮大夫 Tōgū daifu) carries the Obi presented by the Empress into the room. The Crown Prince, dressed in a morning gown and led by the head lady-in-waiting, enters, and the couple sits in chairs facing each other. The head lady-in-waiting places the obi over the princess's hakama and makes a loose bow knot in front, which the princess herself ties. After the couple leaves and the ceremony is complete, a member of the Tōgū staff dressed in formal attire says a few words of congratulations, and then the Grand Steward of the Imperial Household Agency delivers a congratulatory address (御祝詞 onshukushi). The couple will have a celebratory lunch (御祝御膳) at the Imperial Palace in the afternoon and report to the Emperor and Empress.

=== Gifted Sword Ceremony ===
A ceremony in which a child is born into the imperial family and the emperor gives the child a guardian sword for the purpose of protecting the child in the hope that the child will grow up healthy. The kotatana is wrapped in red brocade with a white wooden scabbard and placed in a paulownia box with the Emperor's crest, and entrusted to a messenger (imperial envoy) who receives the Emperor's wishes at the palace. In modern times, the Imperial Sword is subject to the Muzzle Act.

=== Ena mainō no gi (胞衣埋納の儀) ===
A jar containing the placenta is buried in the ground. This was done at least until the birth of The Princess Suga.

=== Bathing ceremony ===
This ceremony is held on the seventh day following the child's birth. The room is divided into two parts, and in one part, a maid gives the child a bath. In the other room, a tokusho yaku wearing a robe and cape recites a classical text (usually from the Nihon Shoki), while a meigen yaku draws a bowstring with a shout. Depending on the situation, the bathing may only be imitated.

=== Naming Ceremony ===
This ceremony is held on the seventh day of the child's birth. The name of the child is written with a brush on a piece of Odakadan-gami paper, and a piece of Japanese paper on which the child's personal seal is written is placed in a paulownia box and placed at the child's bedside. The day after this ceremony, the child's name is recorded in the Imperial Records as an official member of the Imperial Family. This is the "Oshichiya" in general.

=== Sanden Hokokunogi ===
At the same time and day as the naming ceremony, a worshiper informs Miyanaka Sanden of the birth and naming of a child of the Imperial Family.

=== Rite of visiting the Palace Sanctuaries (kashikodokoro-koureiden-shinden ni essuru no gi) ===
This is a Shinto ceremony in which a newborn child of the Imperial Family, joined by his or her parents, makes the first visit to the Three Palace Sanctuaries, starting at the Kashikodokoro, then the Koureiden, and lastly the Shinden, for the first time on the 50th day after birth. This is similar to Miyamairi, a traditional Shinto rite of passage in Japan for newborns.

=== The Ceremony of the First Chopsticks ===
This is a ritual in which red bean porridge is prepared in a new bowl or chopsticks and fed to the child on the 100th–120th day after birth, in hopes that the child will grow up healthy. In reality, however, it is only an imitation of eating. This is called "Okitsuke" in general.

== Growth ==
=== The ceremony of wearing hakama ===
When a child is five years old, he or she wears the hakama that was given to him or her during the ceremony of the Presentation of the Sword. Boys wear white silk hakama on top of "Ochitakizu no Gofuku", a kimono decorated with a waterfall design, while girls wear dark reddish-purple kosode and hakama of the same color.

=== Fukasogi no Gi ===
The ceremony is held following the Kimono Ceremony. In addition to the kimono and hakama worn in the ceremony, a child's kimono is worn in a separate room. The child stands on the board with a pine tree and a small branch of mountain tachibana, and after cutting the child's hair a little, the child jumps down with a shout.。

Originally, the ceremony was independent of the Kimono ceremony, but by the early modern period, it was performed simultaneously. The ceremony was held for the first time in 41 years, after 1970 for Fumihito Reimiya, and in 2011 for His Imperial Highness. This was the first time in 41 years. This is the first time in 41 years that the Fukasogi Ritual has been performed for the female members of the Imperial Family (the four Inner Princes and five Queens), so at least in the modern era, it is a ceremony performed only for the male members of the Imperial Family.

After the completion of the Ceremony of the Hakama and the Fukasogi Ritual, the three halls of the Imperial Palace are visited.

=== Adulthood Ceremony ===
The Imperial Household Law states that the age of majority for the Emperor, Crown Prince, and Grandchildren is 18 (Article 22). In the Imperial Household Law, the age of majority for the Emperor, Crown Prince, and Grandchildren is 18 (Article 22), and there are no age regulations for other members of the Imperial Family. However, according to the Civil code, the ceremony is held when the person turns 20.

==== The Rite of Crowning ====
At the home of a male member of the Imperial Family who has reached the age of majority, the male member of the Imperial Family receives a crown from a messenger sent by the Emperor.

==== Crowning Ceremony ====
A male member of the Imperial Family who has reached the age of majority wears a white silk hakama over Keteki-no-hou, the costume of a minor, and holds a Scepter in his hand. On his head, he wears a kuuchi kokusaku, the headgear of a minor, and is led by a leader into the hall of the Tokyo Imperial Palace where the Emperor, Empress, and attendees are waiting. The crowning officer then removes the black belt and puts on a crown with a swallow-tailed tail, attaches a hanging cord to the crown, ties it at the chin, and cuts off both ends of the cord.

The crown is then tied at the chin, and the ends of the cord are cut off. Then, a male member of the Imperial Family who has reached the age of majority steps before the Emperor and Empress to express his gratitude and resolve. The ceremony ends with a word of thanks to his parents as well.

After this, the adult male members of the Imperial Family change into their adult attire of Sueki-no-Hao and a crown with a hanging tail, and visit the three halls of the palace.

==== Asami no Ritual ====
A ceremony in which a person meets the Emperor and Empress for the first time after reaching the age of majority. The ceremony is held in Western attire. The ceremony ends with the sipping of the nine-year-old wine in turn and the eating of the ritual food with chopsticks.
After this, Orders, decorations, and medals of Japan are given according to rank, and the coming-of-age ceremony ends. A short time after the ceremony, people visit mausoleums and shrines to report on their coming of age.

== Marriage ==
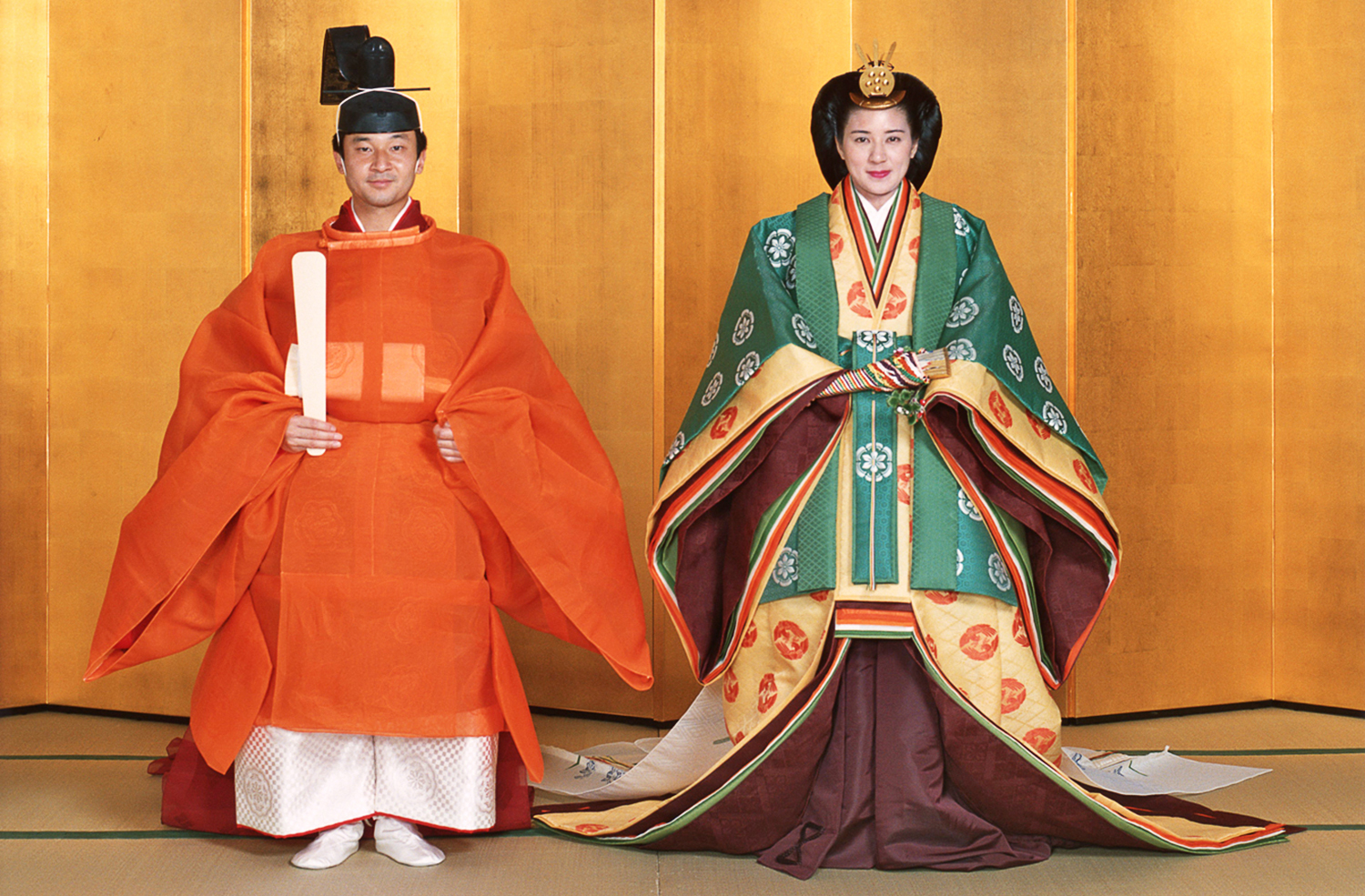
Wedding Ceremony of then Crown Prince Naruhito and Masako Owada 9 June 1993

The emperor's marriage is called a big wedding in the old Imperial Family Order, but as of 2019, it has never taken place, as no one has married since 1910, when this was established, after he ascended the throne.

=== Nōsai no gi (納采の儀) ===
This is a ceremony to mark the Imperial Family's acceptance of an engagement.。This ritual is an extension of the yuinō |ja which are customary engagement gifts. In accordance with the origin of the Imperial Family in Kansai, it is performed in Kansai style in that the groom's side gives to the bride's side. Sea bream, nihonshū, and bolts of cloth are given.

=== Rite of bestowal of medals and swords ===
This is a rite of bestowing medals and swords. This ceremony takes place after the Rite of Acceptance.

=== Kokki-no-gi ===
A messenger from the emperor's side informs the woman's side of the marriage date.

=== Ritual of gift-writing ===
A ceremony in which engaged couples present each other with waka poems on the day before marriage.

=== Judai no Gi ===
On the day of the marriage ceremony, a messenger is sent to the woman's side to welcome her.

=== The marriage ceremony ===
The Wedding is a ceremony in which a man and a woman pay their respects to the wise men in the three halls of the palace. It is also known as a wedding ceremony in general. For more information, see Crown Prince Tokujin and Masako Owada's Marriage Ritual.

=== Kashikokoro Koreiden Shinden ni Etsuru no Gi ===
Female members of the Imperial Family who are to leave the Imperial Family through marriage to a commoner do not perform the marriage ceremony in the Imperial Palace, but rather worship at the three halls of the Imperial Palace dressed in Kouchiki clothing and report to their ancestors and the gods that they are getting married. The ceremony is not accompanied by the man to be married.

=== Chōken-no-gi ===
A ceremony in which two people meet the Emperor and Empress for the first time as husband and wife. The men and women of the imperial family express their gratitude and aspirations to the emperor, and after receiving his blessing, they sip nine-year-old sake in turn and exchange a cup to solidify their relationship, chopsticks up on the ceremonial food, and ends.
The surrendering female members of the Imperial Family meet the Emperor and Empress alone and are similarly blessed, but it is a farewell cup, and subsequent Weddings and other events are held outside the imperial family.
Nine-year-old sake was originally made with Sake, which had been aged for nine years and turned amber, but after the Meiji era, aged old sake was eliminated and the juice of black beans boiled with sake and Mirin was boiled down.

=== Kuzen-no-gi ===
This ceremony is held at home after the couple has returned home. Before the ceremonial meal, the queen and the royal family men, in that order, sip sake and share a cup to seal the marriage. After that, the ritual meal is served with chopsticks, and the ceremony ends.

=== Mikayo no Mochi no Gi ===
The Mikayo-no-Mochi-no-Gi is held in the bedroom to pray for the prosperity of one's descendants. Each of the four silver plates (three plates for non-Emperor and Crown Prince) is filled with the number of rice cakes (about the size of a Go stone) of the Queen's age, and the couple eats one from each plate. The rice cakes and plates are placed in an ebony box with mother-of-pearl inlays of Barn swallows and displayed in the bedroom for three days, and on the fourth day, they are buried in a direction that brings good luck.

=== On the fourth day, it is buried in an auspicious direction. ===
The Wedding reception is a feast held over several days. A wedding reception in general.

=== Wedding reception ===
The couple reports their marriage to the Ise Grand Shrine in Ise, Mie Prefecture.

== Enthronement ==
=== The Rite of Succession of the Sword and Seal ===
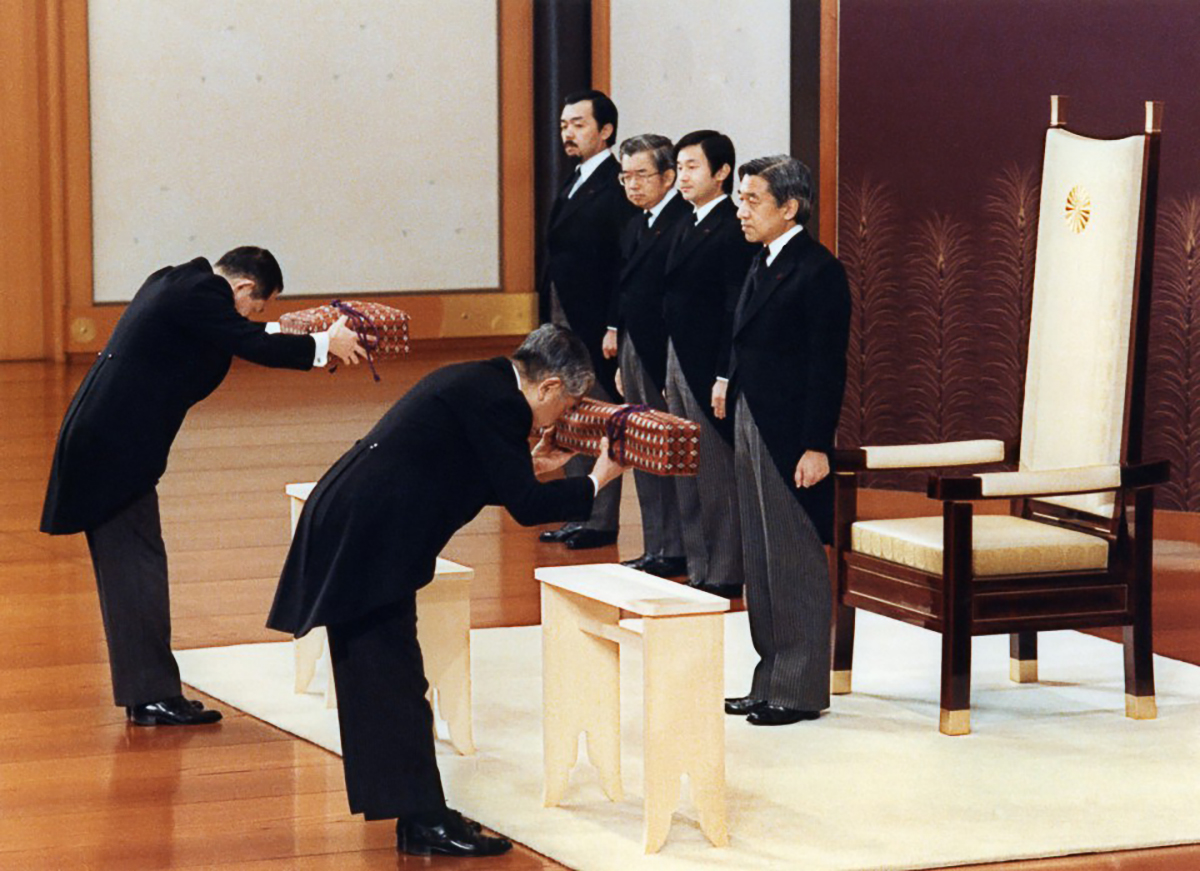
Succession Ceremony of the Sword and Seal of the 125th Emperor Akihito.

Acts of State.

=== Kenji tōgyo (剣璽渡御; Ceremony of moving the Sword and Jewel) ===
Held simultaneously with the first day of Kashikodokoro no gi, each male member of the Imperial Family, each Minister of State, the Prime Minister, the Speaker of the House of Representatives, Speaker of the House of Councillors, and Chief Justice of the Supreme Court follow along to place the sword and jewel in Kenji-no-Ma of the Imperial Residence. The Emperor wears his normal dress and is preceded by the Chief of Ceremonies and the Director General of the Imperial Household Agency (formerly Minister of the Imperial Household).

=== Kashikodokoro no gi (賢所の儀) ===
A ritual to announce by proxy to the Kashikodokoro that a new Emperor has acceded to the Imperial throne. The head of the Emperor's Shinto ritualists (掌典長 shōtenchō) reads a norito and performs proxy worship on behalf of the Emperor; afterward, the shotencho presents an Imperial proclamation (御告文 otsugebumi) to announce the accession to the throne, while one of the Palace Sanctuaries' caretakers (内掌典 naishōten) rings a suzu. After a further proxy worship on the behalf of the Empress, the ritual is over. This is repeated for two days more without the presentation of the proclamation or ringing of the bell.

=== Kashikodokoro ni kijitsu hōkoku no gi (賢所に期日奉告の儀) ===
A ritual to announce the date that the enthronement will be held to the Kashikodokoro.

=== Chōken no gi (朝見の儀; Rite of Audience after Accession) ===
This is an act of state. The ceremony is held in the main hall (Matsu-no-Ma) of the palace, with the emperor in formal attire and the empress in robe décolleté (middle-grade formal attire). For the first time since the accession to the throne, the emperor gives an audience to his subjects and presents them with the imperial message. This is followed by the Prime Minister's address (renamed the "Address of the People's Representative" in the 2019 Post-Accession Audience Ceremony).

== The ceremony of vassalage ==
The ceremony of descent to the vassalage before the Emperor, Empress and Dowager Empress.

The imperial family members who are to descend to the vassalage attend the imperial palace and make their speeches before the Emperor and Empress, receiving the imperial message from the Emperor and the I-sensei from the Empress. The emperor and empress then present the imperial message and the I-i, respectively.

== Bibliography ==
- 高橋紘『象徴天皇』（岩波新書、1987年）
- 原武史『昭和天皇』（岩波新書、2008年）
- 八木秀次「宮中祭祀廃止論に反駁する｣（｢正論｣、2008年6月5日付）
- NHKスペシャル「象徴天皇 素顔の記録」（NHK、2009年4月10日放送、のちDVD）
- 小池康寿 (November 2015). 日本人なら知っておきたい正しい家相の本. プレジデント社. ISBN 9784833421492.
- 斎藤英喜 (October 2007). 陰陽道の神々. 佛教大学鷹陵文化叢書 (in Japanese). Vol. 17. 佛教大学教育部思文閣出版. ISBN 9784784213665. JPNO 21312049.
- 繁田信一 (May 2005). 平安貴族と陰陽師. 吉川弘文館. ISBN 9784642079426.
- 林淳 (December 2005). 近世陰陽道の研究. 吉川弘文館. ISBN 9784642034074.
- 圭室文雄 (March 2006). 日本人の宗教と庶民信仰. 吉川弘文館. ISBN 9784642013673.
- 岡田荘司 (June 2010). 日本神道史. 吉川弘文館. ISBN 9784642080385.

== See also ==
- Japanese Imperial Rituals
- Kyoto Imperial Palace
