= Recusal =

Abstaining from participation in an official action due to a conflict of interest

Recusal is the legal process by which a judge, juror, or other adjudicator steps aside from participating in a case due to potential bias, conflict of interest, or appearance of impropriety. This practice is fundamental to ensuring fairness and impartiality in legal proceedings, preserving the integrity of the judiciary, and maintaining public confidence in the legal system. Historical and modern legal frameworks outline specific grounds for recusal, such as personal or financial conflicts of interest, prior involvement in a case, or demonstrated bias. Applicable statutes or canons of ethics may provide standards for recusal in a given proceeding or matter. Providing that the judge or decision-maker must be free from disabling conflicts of interest makes the fairness of the proceedings less likely to be questioned, and more likely that there is due process.

Recusal laws and guidelines are established in various legal systems worldwide, including the United States, where they are regarded as cornerstones of judicial impartiality. In the United States Supreme Court and lower courts, however, there is no procedure for enforcing their respective recusal codes. The concept of recusal dates back to ancient legal systems and has evolved to address contemporary ethical standards and legal complexities.

Some recusal systems have been critiqued as not being robust or sufficiently transparent, prompting calls for reform. Proposed changes include mandatory disclosure of campaign expenditures by litigants and stricter recusal standards for those benefiting from interested parties. Letting an individual determine whether or not they have a conflict of interest, can in and of itself be considered a conflict-of-interest.

Some scholars also find that recusal proceedings, especially insofar as they occur in analyzing campaign financing conflict of interest between judge and litigants, are not as effective a safeguard as they purport to be in the way that the change in judge taints “impartiality and legitimacy nonetheless.”

== Terminology ==
The term recuse originates from the Latin word recusare, meaning "to demur", or "object" reflecting the fundamental principle of rejecting participation when impartiality is in doubt. The word recuse traces its origins to the Anglo-French term recuser, meaning "to refuse", which itself comes from the Middle French and Latin recusare. The Latin roots break down into re-, meaning "back", and causari, meaning "to give a reason", which derives from causa, meaning "cause" or "reason".

Judicial disqualification is sometimes used interchangeably with recusal, but has also been seen as distinct from recusal in certain jurisdictions where a disqualification can lead to a case being thrown out after the fact if a judge had a conflict of interest in a case where they did not recuse themselves.

== History ==
Judicial disqualification laws existed in Roman law and early Jewish law, which disqualified judges from serving on cases of family, friends or enemies.

Civil law countries still have significant disqualification privileges, whereas common law countries, such as England, went in a different direction where recusal was required less often. This included the United States, which inherited a system where only judges with a direct financial interest in a case had to recuse themselves.

== Potential grounds for recusal ==
Section (a) of the Federal Recusal Statute (28 U.S. Code § 455 - Disqualification of justice, judge, or magistrate judge) states that “Any justice, judge, or magistrate judge of the United States shall disqualify himself in any proceeding in which his impartiality might reasonably be questioned.” These threats to impartiality can take many forms, including, but not limited to, those that are listed below.

=== Conflict of interest ===
A conflict of interest occurs when an individual's duties and responsibilities are in opposition to their personal or financial interests. For example, US Department of Interior employees should recuse themselves if their decisions could have a direct and predictable effect on their financial interests or those of their family members or close associates. However, even in cases where the conflict does not mandate recusal under the Code of Ethics, public officials might still choose to recuse themselves voluntarily to avoid any appearance of bias or impropriety. This also applies to cases when Federal Judges have close personal or professional relationships with attorneys or other parties involved in the case.

The presence of financial interests that could be affected by the outcome of a case is another critical reason for recusal. For U.S. federal judges, this includes any ownership of legal or equitable interests, no matter how small, or relationships such as director or adviser in the affairs of a party. The Due Process clauses of the United States Constitution, for example, explicitly require judges to recuse themselves from cases where they have a financial interest in the outcome.

=== Bias or prejudice ===
Personal bias or prejudice concerning a party or the lawyer of that party is a significant ground for recusal in the United States. The Due Process clauses of the United States Constitution explicitly require judges to recuse themselves from cases where there is a strong possibility the decision would be biased. In North Carolina, however, mere allegations of bias or prejudice are inadequate; there must be substantive evidence to compel recusal. Some Judges and officials are advised to recuse themselves from cases where they have engaged in policy advocacy or public comments that could affect their impartiality. In Rhode Island, public officials who recuse themselves from certain matters may still engage in public comment under specific conditions, such as the "Public Forum Exception". However, this exception is limited and does not allow officials to represent others or act as expert witnesses in forums restricted to the general public.

=== Professional history ===
Previous professional experience can also be potential grounds for recusal. If the judge was involved in the case’s litigation in another court, served as a witness for an involved party, if the judge previously argued the case as a lawyer, or if they worked in a government position that had previously made them involved in opinion/action on the case, there would be grounds for recusal according to Canon 2 Rule 2.11(A)(6)(a-d) of the American Bar Association’s Model Code of Judicial Conduct.

=== Political causes ===
In some cases, litigants have called for a judge’s recusal due to their racial identity on the grounds that their race gives them inherent bias in judicial decision-making. These cases are often brought against judges of color who are thought to be inherently partial towards people who share their racial identity. In Commonwealth of Pennsylvania v. Local Union 542, for example, the case’s defendants pushed for presiding Judge Higginbotham to recuse himself for conflict of interest; the case was about employment discrimination, and the white litigants did not trust Judge Higginbotham, a Black judge, to rule impartially due to his racial identity. Judge Higginbotham refused to recuse himself, citing that “determinations of judicial bias must begin by first assuming that all judges have a race, a gender, and a professional background,” and therefore it would be unjust to disqualify a justice for their race and personal perspectives given that everyone has both.

This issue of recusal on the basis of race has continued into the 21st century courts. In State v. Robinson, the first North Carolina death penalty case reviewed for prejudice under the Racial Justice Act, the state prosecutors called for presiding Judge Gregory Weeks’ recusal. Their rationale for the recusal request was their belief that Judge Weeks would better serve the case as a witness than as its judge given his previous experience presiding over death penalty cases. The prosecutors’ reasoning fell under scrutiny by both defendant Marcus Robinson’s own lawyer and external legal experts who believed that the prosecutors were attempting to remove Weeks, a Black male judge, from the case due to his race. Superior Court Judge Quentin Sumner turned down the prosecutors’ request to remove Weeks, arguing that they had insufficiently evidenced the benefit of Weeks’ service as a witness in their subpoena. In keeping with Sumner’s decision, Judge Weeks stayed on as the judge in the case’s court proceedings.

Additionally, many scholars argue that racial diversity on the bench actually enriches the fairness and justice of the courts instead of threatening it. These arguments are parts of larger movements for increased judicial diversity to represent the American public and enhance institutional legitimacy.

Some claim that strong religious conviction could warrant a judge’s recusal, as the judge may find themselves torn in allegiance to their sacred text and the Constitution. Per the Model Code of Judicial Conduct, judges are expected to check their own conflict of interest in cases where they might enact their religious bias. However, there is much conflict on the constitutionality of religious recusal, as it bumps up against the First Amendment’s Free Exercise Clause, as well as the 3rd Clause of Article VI that repudiates any “religious Test” as part of the “Qualification” for any U.S. office. Like in the case of racial diversity on the bench, some counter this argument for the need to recuse oneself on the basis of religious conviction by claiming that religion can be a “useful background and focusing tool” that should have its own place in judicial decision-making.

== Recusal in the United States ==
Two sections of Title 28 of the United States Code (the Judicial Code) provide standards for judicial disqualification or recusal. Section 455, captioned "Disqualification of justice, judge, or magistrate judge", provides that a federal judge "shall disqualify himself in any proceeding in which his impartiality might reasonably be questioned". The section also provides that a judge is disqualified "where he has a personal bias or prejudice concerning a party, or personal knowledge of disputed evidentiary facts concerning the proceeding"; when the judge has previously served as a lawyer or witness concerning the same case or has expressed an opinions concerning its outcome; or when the judge or a member of his or her immediate family has a financial interest in the outcome of the proceeding.

28 U.S.C. Section 144, captioned "Bias or prejudice of judge", provides that under circumstances, when a party to a case in a United States District Court files a "timely and sufficient motion that the judge before whom the matter is pending has a personal bias or prejudice either against him or in favor of an adverse party", the case shall be transferred to another judge.

The general rule is that, to warrant recusal, a judge's expression of an opinion about the merits of a case, or his familiarity with the facts or the parties, must have originated in a source outside the case itself. This is referred to in the United States as the "extra-judicial source rule" and was recognized as a general presumption, although not an invariable one, in the 1994 U.S. Supreme Court decision in Liteky v. United States.

At times justices or judges will recuse themselves sua sponte (on their own motion), recognizing that facts leading to their disqualification are present. However, where such facts exist, a party to the case may suggest recusal. Controversially, each judge generally decides whether or not to recuse themself. However, where lower courts are concerned, an erroneous refusal to recuse in a clear case can be reviewed on appeal or, under extreme circumstances, by a petition for a writ of prohibition.

In certain special situations, circumstances that would otherwise call for recusal of a judge or group of judges may be disregarded, when otherwise no judge would be available to hear the case. For example, if a case concerns a salary increase payable to a judge, that judge would ordinarily be disqualified from hearing the case. However, if the pay increase is applicable to all of the judges in the court system, the judge will keep the case, because the grounds for recusal would be equally applicable to any other judge. The principle that a judge will not be disqualified when the effect would be that no judge could hear the case is sometimes referred to as the "rule of necessity".

Recusal is largely a self-policed process in the United States judiciary. Any judge or Justice who has perceived bias or conflict of interest in a case is obligated to recuse themselves on the basis of the Due Process clause of the 14th Amendment, Section 1. The Model Code of Judicial Conduct reinforces this responsibility: “A judge shall disqualify himself or herself in any proceeding in which the judge’s impartiality* might reasonably be questioned, including but not limited to the following circumstances.” In accordance with the Code, Judges must therefore consider their ability to remain impartial and recuse themselves in the face of a conflict of interest.

Per the Code of Conduct for United States Judges, “a Judge Should Avoid Impropriety and the Appearance of Impropriety in All Activities.” The consequence of exhibiting actual or perceived impropriety is erosion of public trust in the judiciary and a threat to institutional legitimacy. Recusal proceedings are intended to safeguard public trust in the courts and in the rule of law. Some argue, however, that recusal is not necessarily the premier assurance of trust in court proceedings and their outcome, saying that even a successful recusal and change to a presiding judge can taint the public’s trust in the court proceedings due to perceptions of fairness.

In November 2023, the Supreme Court adopted its own Code of Conduct whose stipulations on the disqualification and recusal process are akin to the precedents set by the Model Code of Judicial Conduct encouraged for lower United States courts. There is, however, no method of enforcement for the Supreme Court’s Codes of Conduct, nor that of the lower courts, and judges and justices are expected to enforce them for themselves. Some reforms call for the implementation of enforcement procedures for the recusal process to hold judges and Justices more accountable in their responsibility to self-police their bias.

=== Supreme Court cases ===
In the Supreme Court of the United States, the Justices have historically recused themselves from participating in cases in which they have financial interests. For example, Justice Sandra Day O'Connor generally did not participate in cases involving telecommunications firms because she owned stock in these firms, and Justice Stephen Breyer disqualified himself in some cases involving insurance companies because of his participation in a Lloyd's of London syndicate. Justices also have declined to participate in cases in which close relatives, such as their children, are lawyers for one of the parties. Even if the family member is connected to one of the parties but is not directly involved in the case, justices may recuse themselves – for instance Clarence Thomas recused himself in United States v. Virginia because his son was attending Virginia Military Institute, whose policies were the subject of the case. On occasion, recusal occurs under more unusual circumstances; for example, in two cases, Chief Justice William H. Rehnquist stepped down from the bench when cases were argued by Arizona attorney James Brosnahan, who had testified against Rehnquist at his confirmation hearing in 1986. Whatever the reason for recusal, the United States Reports will record that the named justice "took no part in the consideration or decision of this case".

A notable case was the 2001 death penalty appeal by Napoleon Beazley, convicted of a 1994 murder, in which a full three justices recused themselves due to personal ties to the victim's son, federal appeals court judge J. Michael Luttig. Luttig had previously clerked for Justice Scalia, and had led the confirmation efforts on behalf of both David Souter and Clarence Thomas. The death sentence was upheld all the same.

Historically, standards for recusal in the Supreme Court and lower courts were less rigorous than they have become in more recent years. In the 1803 case of Marbury v. Madison, Chief Justice John Marshall participated in the decision and authored the opinion of the Court even though Marshall's actions as Secretary of State two years prior could be seen as the subject of the proceeding. On the other hand, Marshall did recuse himself in both the 1813 and 1816 hearings of Martin v. Hunter's Lessee, despite its equally significant constitutional implications, as he and his brother had contracted with Martin to buy the land in dispute. Moreover, during the 19th century, the U.S. federal court system was structured so that an appeal from a judge's decision was often heard by an appellate panel containing the same judge, who was expected to sit in impartial review of his own earlier ruling. This situation is no longer permissible, and 28 U.S.C. § 47 provides that "No judge shall hear or determine an appeal from the decision of a case or issue tried by him."

A notable dispute over recusal in U.S. Supreme Court history took place in 1946, when Justice Hugo Black participated in deciding the Jewell Ridge Coal case, although a former law partner of Black argued for the prevailing side. The losing party in the 5–4 decision sought reargument on the ground that Black should have been disqualified; Black declined to recuse himself and the decision stood, but Justice Robert H. Jackson wrote a short opinion suggesting that the decision that Black should sit in the case was Black's alone and the Court did not endorse it. The dispute aggravated infighting between Black and Jackson, and it has been suggested that this was one of the reasons that, when Chief Justice Harlan Fiske Stone died, President Harry S. Truman appointed Fred M. Vinson to succeed Stone rather than promote a sitting Associate Justice to Chief Justice.

In 1973, then-Associate Justice Rehnquist wrote a lengthy in-chambers opinion declining to recuse himself in Laird v. Tatum, a case challenging the validity of certain arrests, even though Rehnquist had previously served as a White House lawyer and opined that the arrest program was valid. In 2004, Justice Antonin Scalia wrote an opinion declining to recuse himself in a case to which Vice President Dick Cheney was a party in his official capacity, despite the contention of several environmental groups that Scalia's participation created an appearance of impropriety because Scalia had recently participated in a widely publicized hunting trip with the Vice President. The same year, however, Scalia recused himself without explanation in Elk Grove Unified School District v. Newdow, a First Amendment case challenging inclusion of the words "under God" in the Pledge of Allegiance, after giving a public speech in which Scalia stated his view that Newdow's claims were meritless.

In 2009, the Supreme Court ruled 5-4 that 'excessive' campaign contributions to a justice that was elected required a justice to recuse himself, citing the Due Process Clause of the constitution.

In 2024, Justices Alito and Thomas refused calls to recuse themselves from January 6th cases where their spouses have taken public stances or been involved in efforts to overturn the election.

In March 2025, five of the nine Supreme Court justices recused themselves in the case of Baker vs. Coates. Four of the five (Sotomayor, Barett, Gorsuch, and Brown Jackson) had been previously published by Penguin Random House, owned by Bertelsmann SE & Co. KGaA, one of the defendants. These four justices’ previous involvement with the publishing company could have given them financial incentive in their ruling on the case, and therefore presented a conflict of interest in their presiding over it. Alito had no previous partnership with Bertelsmann SE & Co. KGaA; the grounds for his recusal remain unclear.

In January 2026, Justice Samuel Alito recused himself in the case between Louisiana parishes and oil conglomerates accused of doing environmental damage in the state due to his substantial oil investments.

=== Federal cases ===
On September 28, 2021, the Wall Street Journal's investigative team found that 131 judges did not recuse themselves in cases where they had a financial interest through ownership of stocks in the relevant parties. Two-thirds of such cases ended with a verdict favorable to the party in which the judge owned stock. Explanations given for the lack of recusal included: unknown ownership via brokers investing on behalf of the judge, being unaware of the laws regarding disclosure and recusal, spelling errors and ownership of subsidiaries (e.g. Exxon Corp. vs Exxon Oil, which is a subsidiary), ownership of stocks held not by the judge but by close family members (spouses, children, etc.), and insistence that stock ownership did not influence their decisions (especially if the outcome did not change stock price). All of these explanations have still been considered a violation of federal law by some experts.

A significant dispute over recusal occurred in 1946 when Justice Hugo Black participated in the Jewell Ridge Coal case despite a conflict involving his former law partner. This case highlighted the ongoing challenges in maintaining impartiality and the evolving nature of recusal practices. Throughout much of its history, the U.S. Supreme Court relied on the justices' discretion and common-law principles to decide recusal matters. In 1974, federal judge Leon Higginbotham issued his decision in Comm. of Pa. v. Local 542, Int'l Union of Operating Engineers, explaining why he as an African American judge with a history of active involvement in the civil rights struggle was not obligated to recuse himself from presiding over litigation concerning claims of racial discrimination. He held, in an opinion that was followed by later judges, including a series of black judges who faced recusal requests, that a judge should not be forced to recuse solely because of their membership in a minority group. Jewish federal Judge Paul Borman relied on the Higginbotham opinion in part in his 2014 decision not to recuse himself from the trial of Palestinian-American Rasmea Odeh. Similarly, in 1994, Jewish then-federal-Judge Michael Mukasey refused to recuse himself in a case concerning the 1993 World Trade Center bombing, warning that his recusal would "disqualify not only an obscure district judge such as the author of this opinion, but also Justices Brandeis and Frankfurter ... each having been both a Jew and a Zionist".

=== Proposed reforms ===
Many scholars find issue with the United States recusal process, as it asks judges who have perceived bias to recuse themselves. In doing so, the process assumes that judges can accurately discern their own bias and that they will reliably disqualify themselves because of it. Additionally, the self-policing nature of the recusal standards can discourage attorneys from calling for a judge’s recusal due to concern of “judicial retribution” for questioning a judge’s impartiality. Following these doubts, there have been many proposals for reform to the recusal process, including, but not limited to, those listed below.

==== Disclosure requirements ====
Disclosure requirements make it easier and more cost-efficient for parties to determine whether their judge may have a financial conflict of interest. Seriously considered, too, is the implementation of the Supreme Court Transparency and Disclosure Act of 2011, which would subject Justices’ recusal decisions to enforcement and review by external assessment. This measure would confront the issue of “self-recusal” and “subject the Court to essentially the same pressures as the lower federal courts’ judges.”

==== Peremptory challenge ====
Peremptory challenges of judges, which is in use in 17 states where each party gets the chance to pass on the judge selected and can still challenge the next judge for cause.

==== Independent adjudication ====
Have an independent decision-maker other than the justice being accused of impartiality make the recusal decision. This also can help to prevent the awkward situation of a judge holding a grudge against the party insisting that bias exists.

==== Streamlined process ====
This would allow for recusals to occur without adding undue costs on the litigants. For example, automatic recusal could be required for cases where a party has made campaign contributions to a judge above a specific amount.

==== Written opinions ====
Requiring opinions for the denial or approval of recusals would help to establish a track record of evidence that would make it easier for appeals courts to review.

==== Substitution ====
In Supreme Court cases, for example, when recusal could swing the outcome of a case, justices could be allowed to have substitute judges without conflicts of interest take their place in order to prevent gamesmanship of the system.

=== Administrative agency and other matters ===
Outside the judicial system, the concept of recusal is also applied in administrative agencies. When a member of a multi-member administrative body is recused, the remaining members typically determine the outcome. When the sole occupant of an official position is recused, the matter may be delegated to the official's deputy or to a temporarily designated official; for example, when the Solicitor General of the United States is recused from a case, the Deputy Solicitor General will handle the matter in his or her place. For example, in 1990, U.S. Attorney General Richard Thornburgh recused himself from an investigation due to his connection with a subject involved in the case. On March 2, 2017, Jeff Sessions, Attorney General of the U.S., recused himself while the department investigated Russian interference in the 2016 election due to concerns over his impartiality as a member of the Trump campaign team.

In Rhode Island, best practices suggest that an official should leave the room during discussions of the matter they are recused from, especially in executive sessions where the presence of the recused individual could be inappropriate. As of 2024, the Department of the Interior suggested that documenting recusal decisions in writing can be useful to clarify the scope and ensure transparency.

== Applicable to most countries ==
Laws or court rules provide the recusal of judges. Although the details vary, the following are nearly universal grounds for recusal.

- The judge is related to a party, attorney, or spouse of either party (usually) within three degrees of kinship.
- The judge is a party.
- The judge is a material witness unless pleading purporting to make the Judge a party is false (determined by presiding judge, but see substitution).
- The judge has previously acted in the case in question as an attorney for a party, or participated in some other capacity.
- The judge prepared any legal instrument (such as a contract or will) whose validity or construction is at issue.
- Appellate judge previously handled case as a trial judge or at a lower appellate level.
- The judge has personal or financial interest in the outcome. This particular ground varies by jurisdiction. Some require recusal if there is any interest at all in the outcome, while others only require recusal if there is interest beyond a certain value.
- The judge determines he or she cannot act impartially.

== Waiver and substitution ==
The recusal rule may be avoided or ignored if all parties and the judge agree, although in practice this rarely occurs. If recusal is avoided in this manner, a full and complete record of the facts that qualify as grounds, above, must be made for the appellate court.

If a judge fails to recuse themselves sua sponte and a party believes the judge has a bias the party may motion for substitution. In some jurisdictions litigants may have the right to substitute a judge, even if no bias is demonstrated.

== See also ==
- Nemo iudex in causa sua

== Sources ==
- Wis. Stat. sec. 757.19(2)
- Wis. SCR 60.04(4)
- State v. Asfoor, 75 Wis.2d 411, 436 (1977).
