= Three Palace Sanctuaries =

Group of structures in Tokyo, Japan

Coordinates: 35°40′54″N 139°44′59″E

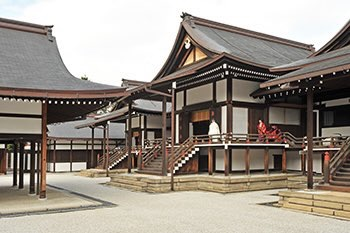
Three Palace Sanctuaries

The Three Palace Sanctuaries (宮中三殿, Kyūchū sanden) are a group of structures in the precincts of the Tokyo Imperial Palace in Japan. They are used in imperial religious ceremonies, including weddings and enthronements.

The three sanctuaries are:

- Kashiko-dokoro (賢所) – the central shrine, enshrining a replica of the mirror Yata no Kagami, representing the mythological ancestress of the Imperial Family, Amaterasu. (For the enthronements in Kyoto of Emperor Taishō in 1915 and of Emperor Shōwa in 1928, the mirror was transported by special rolling stock known as the Kashiko-dokoro Jōgyosha (賢所乗御車) from the name of this sanctuary.) The Yasakani no magatama or Sacred Jewel, one of the Imperial Regalia of Japan, is also said to be housed in the Kashiko-dokoro.
- Kōrei-den (皇霊殿) – the Ancestral Spirits Sanctuary, enshrining the departed spirits of the Imperial Family from one year after their death.
- Shin-den (神殿) – the Sanctuary of the Kami, enshrining the Amatsukami (天津神) from Takamagahara and the Kunitsukami (国津神) from Japanese mythology.

== See also ==
- Japanese Imperial Rituals
- Culture of Japan
- Japanese mythology
- Jinja (Shinto)
- Religion in Japan
