= Jewell Ridge Coal Corp. v. United Mine Workers of America =

- Supreme Court of the United States

Argued March 9, 1945 Decided May 7, 1945
- Full case name: Jewell Ridge Coal Corporation v. Local No. 6167, United Mine Workers Of America, et al.
- Citations: 325 U.S. 161 (more) 65 S. Ct. 1063; 89 L. Ed. 1534; 1945 U.S. LEXIS 2689

Case history
- Prior: 53 F. Supp. 935 (W.D. Va. 1944), reversed, 145 F.2d 10 (4th Cir. 1944); cert. granted, 323 U.S. 707 (1945).
- Subsequent: Petition for rehearing denied on June 18, 1945, 325 U.S. 897 (1945).

Holding
- The underground travel time of coal miners was considered compensable work time under § 7(a) of the Fair Labor Standards Act of 1938, 29 U.S.C. § 207(a).

Court membership
- Chief Justice Harlan F. Stone Associate Justices Owen Roberts · Hugo Black; Stanley F. Reed · Felix Frankfurter; William O. Douglas · Frank Murphy; Robert H. Jackson · Wiley B. Rutledge

Case opinions
- Majority: Murphy, joined by Black, Reed, Douglas, Rutledge
- Dissent: Jackson, joined by Stone, Roberts, Frankfurter

Laws applied
- Fair Labor Standards Act, § 7(a), 29 U.S.C. § 207(a)

Jewell Ridge Coal Corp. v. United Mine Workers of America, 325 U.S. 161 (1945), was a case decided by the Supreme Court of the United States dealing with the compensation of mine workers for time spent traveling to work sites while underground.

== Facts ==
The employer, Jewell Ridge, sought declaratory judgment against its employee's union to determine whether the time spent traveling underground by the coal miners between the portals of the employer's two bituminous coal mines and the working faces was included in the compensable workweek under § 7 of the Fair Labor Standards Act of 1938, 29 U.S.C. § 207(a).

== Judgment ==
=== Majority opinion ===
In an opinion authored by Justice Frank Murphy, the Supreme Court affirmed the appellate court's ruling, holding that underground travel time was compensable under the Act. Relying on the three elements of 'work' established in Tennessee Coal, Iron & Railroad Co. v. Muscoda Local No. 123 (1944), the court reasoned that underground traveling was considered compensable work because it (1) required physical and mental exertion that was (2) controlled and required by the employer (3) for the employer's benefit.

The court distinguished underground travel from typical above-ground commuting by non-miners, stating that once below ground the miner is subject to additional dangers. Furthermore, the court stated that the Fair Labors Standard Act supersedes any previous customs or agreements which excluded such travel time from the compensable work week.

=== Dissenting opinion ===
In his dissent, Justice Jackson argued that majority opinion invalidates or ignores collective bargaining agreements between unions and employers, which he said was contrary to the legislative intent of the Fair Labor Standards Act.

== Black–Jackson feud ==
The coal company later filed a petition for rehearing on the grounds that the miners were represented by Crampton P. Harris, who was Justice Black’s former law partner and personal lawyer. Rehearing of the case was denied by the court on June 18, 1945. However, despite this apparent conflict of interest, Black lobbied the Court for a per curiam denial of the petition for rehearing. Justice Jackson objected to a per curiam denial of rehearing and filed a concurring opinion, which disassociated himself from the ruling and, by implication, criticized Black for not addressing the conflict of interest. The infighting between Black and Jackson may also have played a role in the death of Harlan F. Stone two weeks before this ruling, and the nomination of Fred M. Vinson to the Court instead of a current Associate Justice.

Jackson also criticized Black's alleged proposal of handing down the court's decision without waiting for the majority and dissenting opinions. Jackson claimed that Black's reasoning for this unorthodox proposal was to influence contract negotiations for the ongoing coal strike, in an attempt to strengthen the coal miner's bargaining position. Jackson accused Black of simply trying to manipulate the court process to suit his own ideological agenda.

== See also ==
- US labor law
- List of United States Supreme Court cases, volume 325
- Black–Jackson feud
