= Chōwaden Reception Hall =

Building of the Tokyo Imperial Palace

Coordinates: 35°40′55.7″N 139°45′12.8″E

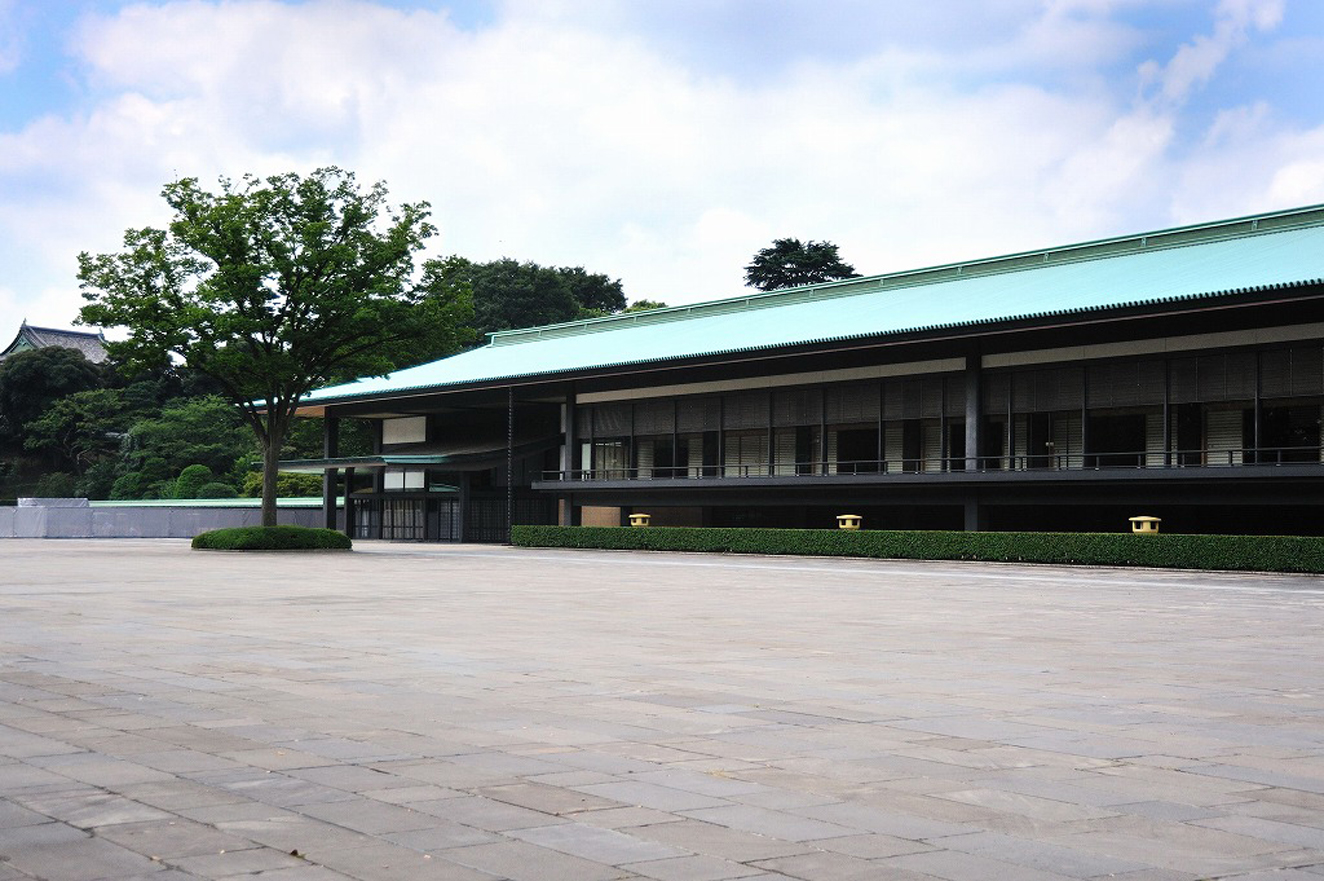
Chōwaden Reception Hall and entrance

Chōwaden Reception Hall

Chōwaden Reception Hall

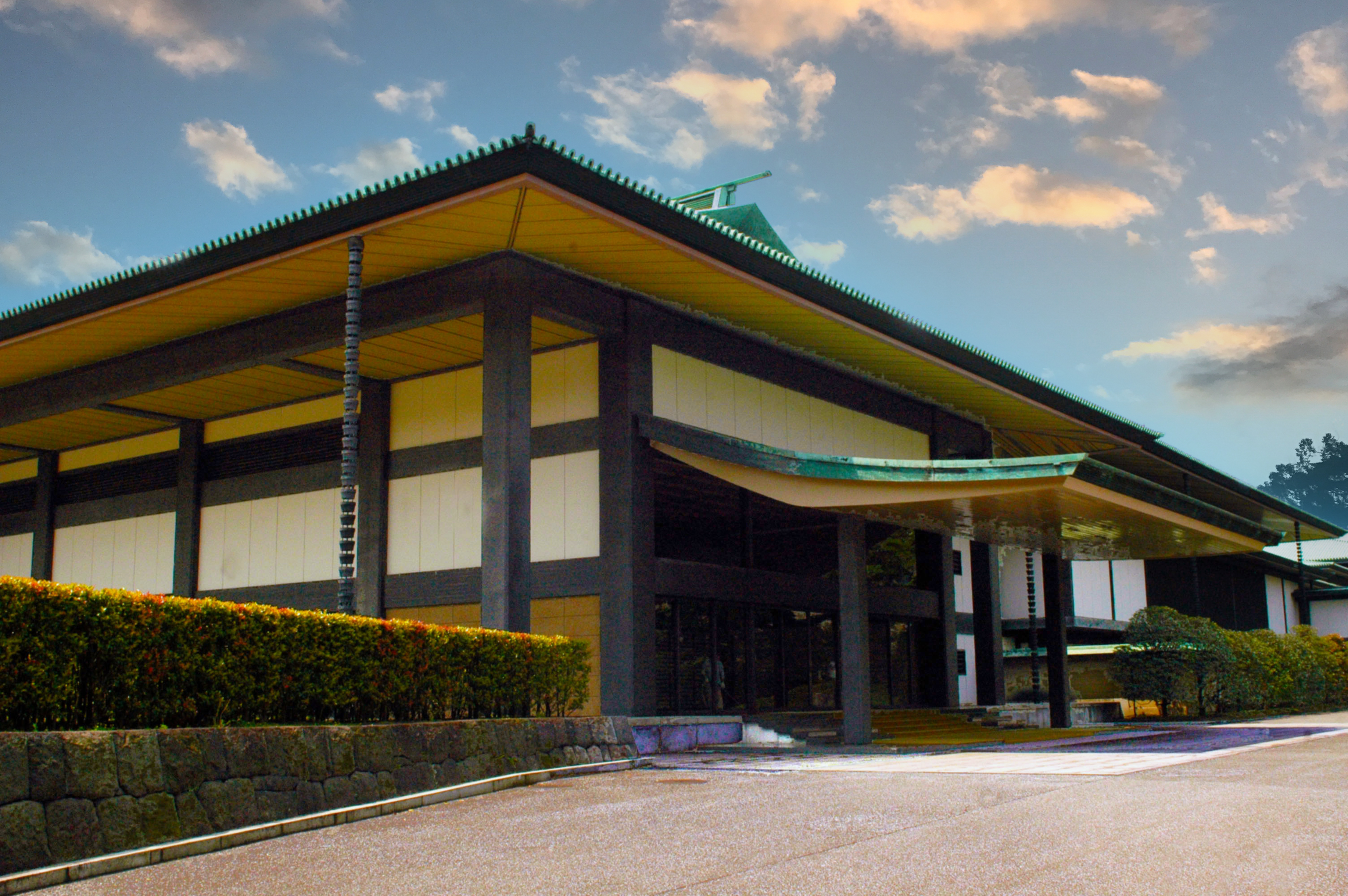
Kitakuruma-yose entrance for visiting dignitaries Imperial Palace Tokyo

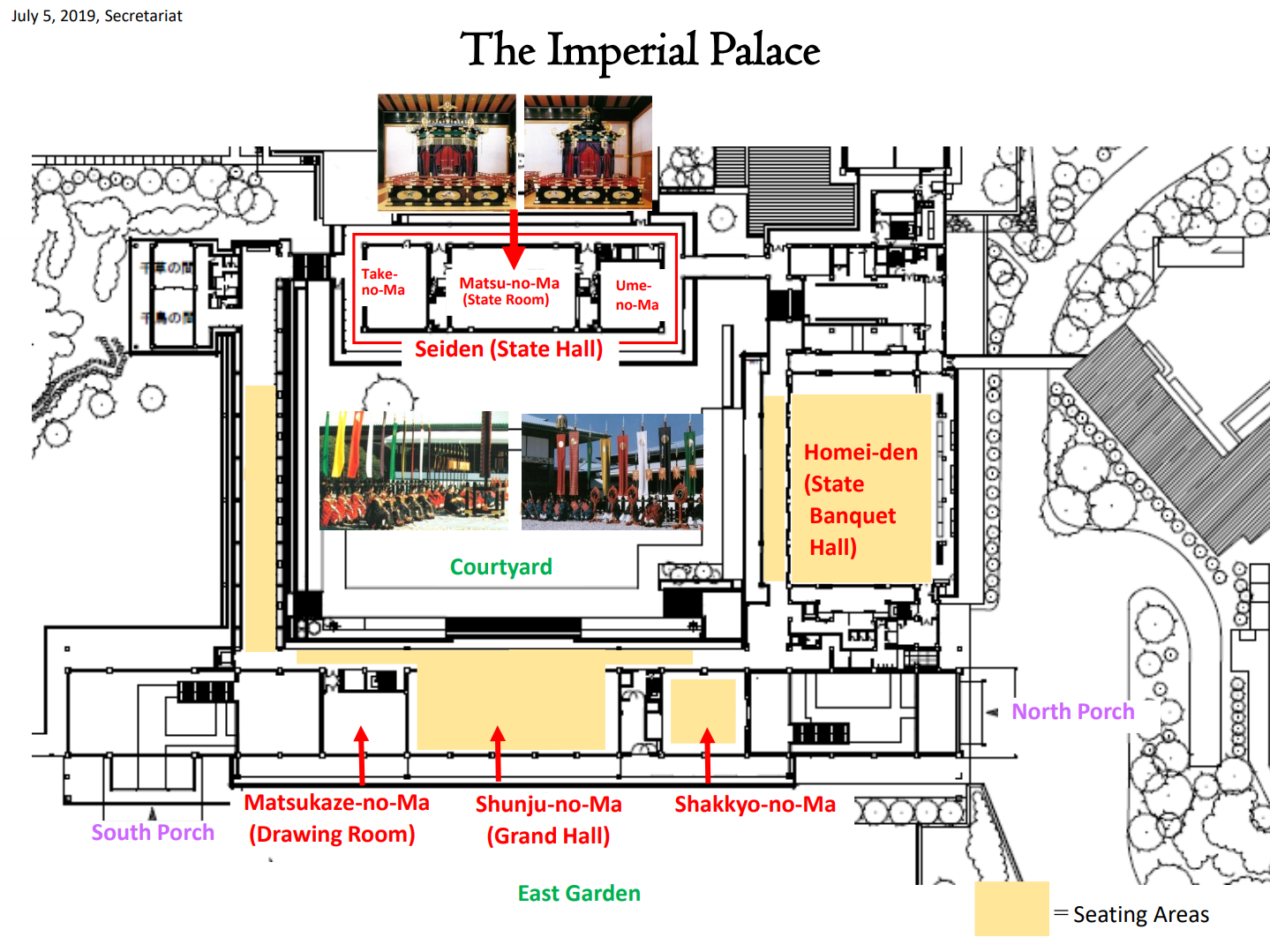
Map of the Kyūden

The Chōwaden Reception Hall (長和殿, Chōwaden) is the largest building of the Tokyo Imperial Palace located in Tokyo, Japan. It is where the Japanese emperor and other members of the Japanese imperial family appear every new year and for the emperor's birthday. It is also where some official state ceremonies and functions are held.

Members of the Japanese imperial family stand behind bulletproof glass on the veranda of the Chōwaden Reception Hall when appearing before the public. It is customary for the emperor to address the people who assemble in the Kyūden Tōtei Plaza in front of the building on January 2 (the day after New Year's Day) and February 23 (Emperor Naruhito's birthday) of each year. Crowds can often be seen waving Japanese flags and shouting "Banzai" on such occasions.

At one end of the Chōwaden Reception Hall is the Kitakuruma-yose entrance for visiting dignitaries.
