= Williams v. North Carolina (1942) =

- Supreme Court of the United States

Argued October 20, 1942 Decided December 21, 1942
- Full case name: Williams, et al. v. State of North Carolina
- Citations: 317 U.S. 287 (more) 63 S. Ct. 207; 87 L. Ed. 279; 1942 U.S. LEXIS 2

Case history
- Prior: State v. Williams, 220 N.C. 445, 17 S.E.2d 769 (1941); cert. granted, 315 U.S. 795 (1942).

Court membership
- Chief Justice Harlan F. Stone Associate Justices Owen Roberts · Hugo Black; Stanley F. Reed · Felix Frankfurter; William O. Douglas · Frank Murphy; Robert H. Jackson

Case opinions
- Majority: Douglas
- Concurrence: Frankfurter
- Dissent: Murphy
- Dissent: Jackson

Williams v. North Carolina, 317 U.S. 287 (1942), is a United States Supreme Court case in which the Court held that the federal government determines marriage and divorce statuses between state lines. Mr. Williams and Ms. Hendrix moved to Nevada and filed for divorce from their respective spouses. Once the divorces were final Mr. Williams and Ms. Hendrix were married and then moved back to North Carolina. They lived there together until they were charged by the state of North Carolina for bigamous cohabitation.

== Background ==
In 1942, divorce was not widely accepted in the United States. In 1942, the annual divorce rate was 10.1 per 1,000 married women, lower than the 2015 rate of 16.9 per 1,000 and much lower than the 1980 peak of nearly 23 per 1,000.

In 1916, Mr. Williams married Ms. Carrie Wyke in North Carolina and resided there until May 1940. In 1920, Ms. Hendrix married Mr. Thomas Hendrix and lived in North Carolina until May 1940. In June 1940, Mr. Williams and Ms. Hendrix moved to Las Vegas, Nevada and on June 26, each filed for a divorce from their respective spouse. “The defendants in those divorce actions entered no appearance nor were they served with process in Nevada. In the case of defendant Thomas Hendrix service by publication was had by publication of the summons in a Las Vegas newspaper and by mailing a copy of the summons and complaint to his last post office address. In the case of defendant Carrie Williams a North Carolina sheriff delivered to her in North Carolina a copy of the summons and complaint”. Mr. Williams was given a decree of divorce on August 26, 1940 by the state of Nevada on the grounds of extreme cruelty, the court finding that 'the plaintiff has been and now is a bona fide and continuous resident of the County of Clark, State of Nevada, and had been such resident for more than six weeks immediately preceding the commencement of this action in the manner prescribed by law'. It was not until October 4, 1940 that Ms. Hendrix was declared divorced on the grounds of willful neglect and extreme cruelty and made the same finding as to this petitioner's bona fide residence in Nevada as it made in the case of Williams. On that same day, October 4, 1940, Mr. Williams and Ms. Hendrix were married in Las Vegas, Nevada. Soon after their marriage they returned to North Carolina where they lived together as man and wife until a lawsuit was filed against them.

Mr. Williams and Ms. Hendrix were prosecuted under the North Carolina law for bigamous cohabitation. They pleaded not guilty by offering copies of the Nevada divorce decree and argued that the divorce papers and their Nevada marriage were legal in both Nevada and North Carolina. The state of North Carolina argued that since neither of the defendants in the Nevada divorce were in Nevada nor entered an appeal there, North Carolina would not acknowledge the divorce in Nevada under the rule of Pridgen v. Pridgen. Furthermore, the state suggested that Mr. Williams and Ms. Hendrix did not go to Nevada to set up a bona fide residence but rather to take advantage of the laws of Nevada, where it is easier to get divorced than in North Carolina (as it only took 6 weeks to obtain a divorce in Nevada), to obtain a divorce through fraud upon that court.

== Opinion of the Court ==
The Supreme Court of North Carolina, in affirming the judgment, declared that North Carolina was not required to recognize the Nevada decrees under the Full Faith and Credit Clause of the Constitution (Art. IV, 1) by reason of Haddock v. Haddock. The inkling from the majority opinion that the Nevada divorces were untrustworthy suggests that the second theory on which the state tried the case may have been an alternative ground for the decision below. It was adequate to sustain the judgment under the rule of Bell v. Bell—a case in which the Court held that a decree of divorce was not entitled to full faith and credit when it had been granted on constructive service by the courts of Nevada, a state in which neither spouse was domiciled. But there are two reasons why the jury did not reach that issue in this case. In the first place, North Carolina does not seek to sustain the judgment below on that ground.

Moreover, it admits that there probably is enough evidence in the record to require that petitioners be considered 'to have been actually domiciled in Nevada.' In the second place, the verdict against petitioners was a general one. “It was there held that a divorce granted by Nevada, on a finding that one spouse was domiciled in Nevada, must be respected in North Carolina, where Nevada's finding of domicile was not questioned though the other spouse had neither appeared nor been served with process in Nevada and though recognition of such a divorce offended the policy of North Carolina.” The ruling: both Mr. Williams and Ms. Hendrix were “convicted of bigamous cohabitation” and were sentenced to a term of years in a state prison.

== Subsequent developments ==
Once the decision was made in the Williams et al. v. State of North Carolina trial, the ruling stood for two years before being called back to trial in 1944 to reexamine the decision. “The record from the 1942 trial did not present the question whether North Carolina had the power to refuse full faith and credit to Nevada divorce decrees because, contrary to the findings of the Nevada court, North Carolina finds that no bona fide domicile was acquired in Nevada.” The Supreme Court ruled that, The Nevada divorces were valid, and must be given full faith and credit by North Carolina, if the travelers really were domiciled in Nevada when they received their divorces. However, domicile was a jurisdictional requirement for the Nevada courts; North Carolina might constitutionally retry the issue of the previous Nevada domicile, and, if its courts found that domicile lacking, might punish its straying residents.

Since the Williams et al. v. State of North Carolina case from 1942, American law in this area has changed in two distinct but related ways. “First, all 50 states (as of 1985) now permit the dissolution of marriage on at least one ‘no fault’ ground. Second, in a variety of contexts the Supreme Court has recognized not only a constitutional right to marry but a broad freedom of intimate association.” It is unlikely that a state would go to such great lengths to preserve a marriage against the will of one spouse and that the trial would be given the same weight today that it was given in the 1940s.
