= Akihito vanuatu =

Conservation status
- Least Concern (IUCN 3.1)

Scientific classification
- Kingdom: Animalia
- Phylum: Chordata
- Class: Actinopterygii
- Division: Teleostei
- Order: Gobiiformes
- Family: Oxudercidae
- Genus: Akihito
- Species: A. vanuatu

Binomial name
- Akihito vanuatu Watson, Keith & Marquet, 2007

Species of fish

Akihito vanuatu, the Vanuatu's emperor, is a species of anadromous ray-finned fish belonging to the subfamily Sicydiinae, freshwater gobies, in the family Oxudercidae, which also includes the eel gobies, mudskippers and related taxa. This fish is endemic to Vanuatu.

== Taxonomy ==
Akihito vanuatu was first formally described in 2007 by the ichthyologists Ronald E. Watson, Philippe Keith and Gérard Marquet with its type locality given as a stream near Pauls Conservation in Ambae Island in Penama Province in Vanuatu. When they described this species they also described a new genus, Akihito wth this species being its type species by monotypy, although a second species A. futuna was also described by Watson, Keith and Marquet in 2008. The genus Akihito belongs to the subfamily Sicydiinae of the goby family Oxudercidae, in the suborder Gobioidei of the order Gobiiformes.

== Etymology ==
Akihito vanuatu is the type species of its genus, the genus name honours the Emperor of Japan Akihito who reigned from 1989 to 2019, who is a published researcher on goby systematics and phylogeny. The specific name, vanuatu, is the name of the island nation that this fish is endemic to.

== Description ==
Akihito vanuatu has an elongated body which reaches a standard length of 4.3 cm (1.7 in) in males and 3.9 cm (1.5 in) in females. This species has 7 spines and 10 softrays in its dorsal fin with 1 spine and 10 soft rays in its anal fin. The females slightly flexible tricuspid teeth set closely together on the premaxilla and they may have a canine-like tooth. Immature males have some conical teeth behind the tricuspid teeth. Adult males only have inflexible recurved or canine-like teeth. They have scales which are higher than they are long, along the middle of the flanks between the second dorsal fin and the anal fin. There are a few ctenoid scales in the middle of the flanks in males while there are only smaller cycloid scales in females. Males have a dark grey head, a reddish trunk and a yellow body to the rear of the dorsal fin with black edges to the scales. The females are yellowish on the head and trunk and also have black edges to the scales towards the tail.

== Distribution and habitat ==
Akihito vanuatu is endemic to Vanuatu where it is found on the islands of Ambae and Pentecost. On Ambae is it found above around 70 m (230 ft) above sea level while on Pentecost its lower limit is 300 m (980 ft) above sea level. These gobies are found in streams with clear water and fast currents, although during the dry season they are found in permanent pools with no current.

== Biology ==
Akihito vanuatu migrates to the sea to breed in the rainy season when water levels are high. Once laid the eggs hatch in 24 hours. They are predators of crustaceans and aquatic insects.
