= Akihito futuna =

Conservation status
- Critically Endangered (IUCN 3.1)

Scientific classification
- Kingdom: Animalia
- Phylum: Chordata
- Class: Actinopterygii
- Order: Gobiiformes
- Family: Oxudercidae
- Genus: Akihito
- Species: A. futuna

Binomial name
- Akihito futuna Keith, Marquet & Watson, 2007

Species of fish

Akihito futuna, the Futuna's emperor, is a species of fish in the family Oxudercidae, the gobies. It is endemic to the island of Futuna in Vanuatu, where it inhabits the many streams present there. Males of this species can reach a length of 6 centimetres (2.4 in) SL, while females can reach 2.9 centimetres (1.1 in) SL.

The type locality of Akihito futuna is the island of Futuna; it has not been found in any other location. Akihito vanuatu, the species first described in 2007 which inhabits the broader Vanuatu area, is similar to A. futuna morphologically; however, A. futuna is distinguished by having lower scale counts and fewer teeth than A. vanuatu. A. futuna females additionally have more canine-like premaxillary teeth; the species shows pronounced sexual dimorphism.
