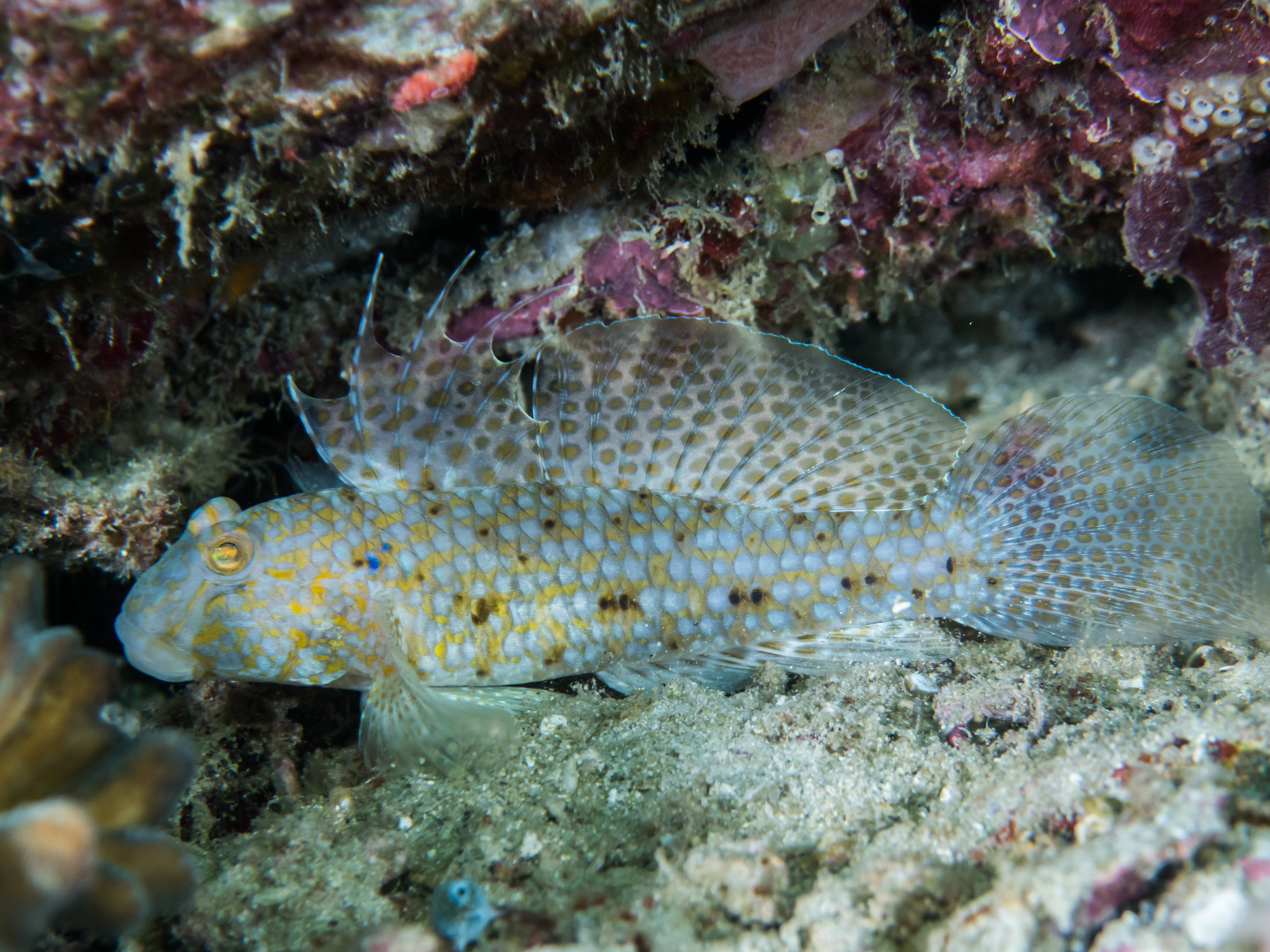

Scientific classification
- Kingdom: Animalia
- Phylum: Chordata
- Class: Actinopterygii
- Order: Gobiiformes
- Family: Gobiidae
- Genus: Exyrias
- Species: E. akihito

Binomial name
- Exyrias akihito G. R. Allen & J. E. Randall, 2005

= Exyrias akihito =

Species of fish

Exyrias akihito is a species of marine goby. Since the recent description of this species it has been found to have a wide distribution in the western Pacific including the Great Barrier Reef, New Guinea, Indonesia, the Philippines and the Yaeyama Islands, Japan. One individual was photographed in Palau, and on January 13, 2005, one was caught in the lagoon of Majuro Atoll in the Marshall Islands. This animal had only 9 soft rays in its dorsal fin instead of the normal 10, a congenital abnormality known to occasionally occur in gobies and other fish.

Members of this species used to be assigned to the widespread species Exyrias belissimus but it differs from that species in a number of respects, notably in the very long dorsal fin spines and the paler coloration with numerous yellow or orange spots on all parts. It also differs in habitat preference: E. belissimus is a bottom-dwelling species of turbid waters while E. akihito prefers clear water and is usually found on coral rubble or sandy patches near coral reefs at a depth of 10–43 m.

The species was named in honour of Emperor Akihito of Japan, who is a keen ichthyologist with a special interest in gobies. Type material for the new species was in part procured by the Imperial Household Agency's Biological Laboratory.

== See also ==
- Akihito, genus of the family Gobiidae named after Akihito
