= Akihito =

Emperor of Japan from 1989 to 2019

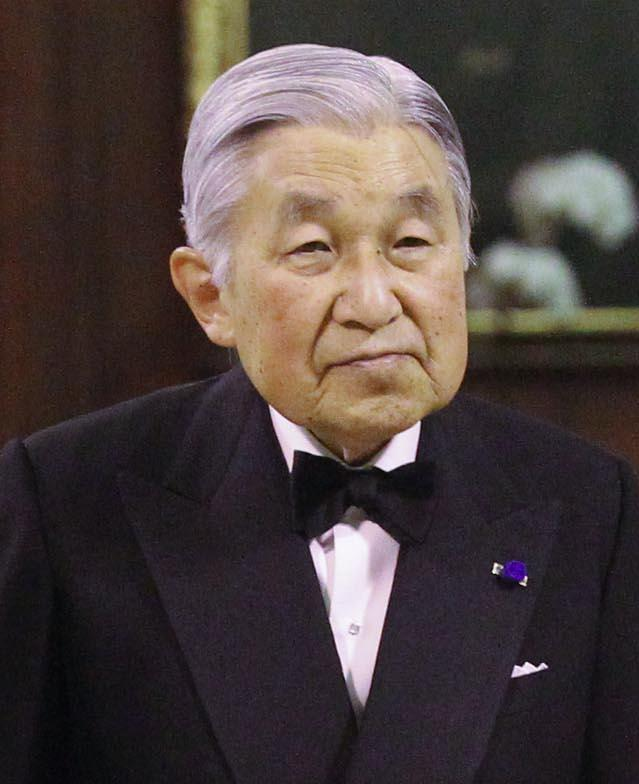
- Akihito in 2016

Emperor of Japan
- Reign: 7 January 1989 – 30 April 2019
- Enthronement: 12 November 1990
- Predecessor: Hirohito
- Successor: Naruhito
- Born: Akihito, Prince Tsugu (継宮明仁親王); 23 December 1933 (age 92); Tokyo Imperial Palace, Tokyo City, Empire of Japan
- Spouse: Michiko Shōda (m. 1959)
- Issue: Naruhito, Emperor of Japan; Fumihito, Crown Prince of Japan; Sayako Kuroda
Era name and dates
- Heisei: 8 January 1989 – 30 April 2019
- House: Imperial House of Japan
- Father: Emperor Shōwa
- Mother: Princess Nagako
- Religion: Shinto

Akihito (Note: 明仁; Japanese: [akiꜜçi̥to]; English: /ˌækiˈhiːtoʊ/ AK-ee-HEE-toh or /ˌɑːk-/ AHK-) (born 23 December 1933) is a member of the Imperial House of Japan who reigned as the 125th emperor of Japan from 7 January 1989 until his abdication on 30 April 2019. The era of his rule was named the Heisei era, Heisei being an expression of achieving peace worldwide.

Akihito was born as the fifth child and first son of Emperor Hirohito and Empress Kōjun. During the Second World War, he moved out of Tokyo with his classmates and remained in Nikkō until the surrender of Japan. In 1952, his Coming-of-Age ceremony and investiture as crown prince were held, and he began to undertake official duties in his capacity as crown prince. The next year, he made his first journey overseas and represented Japan at the coronation of Elizabeth II in London. He completed his university education in 1956. In April 1959, he married Michiko Shōda, a commoner; it was the first imperial wedding to be televised in Japan, drawing about 15 million viewers. The couple has three children: Naruhito, Fumihito, and Sayako.

Akihito succeeded to the Chrysanthemum Throne and became emperor upon his father's death in January 1989, with an enthronement ceremony in 1990. He made efforts to bring the Japanese imperial family closer to the Japanese people, and made official visits to all forty-seven prefectures of Japan and to many of the remote islands of Japan. He has a keen interest in natural life and conservation, as well as Japanese and world history. Akihito abdicated in 2019, citing his advanced age and declining health, and assumed the title Emperor Emeritus (上皇, Jōkō; lit. 'Retired Emperor'). He was succeeded by his elder son, Naruhito, whose era is named Reiwa (令和). At age 92, Akihito is the longest-lived verifiable Japanese emperor in recorded history. During his reign, 17 prime ministers served in 25 terms, beginning with Noboru Takeshita and ending with Shinzo Abe. He is the oldest living member of the Imperial House of Japan, following the death of Yuriko, Princess Mikasa, on 15 November 2024. (Note: Akihito's older sister, Atsuko Ikeda, formerly Atsuko, Princess Yori, was born 7 March 1931, but Japanese law requires princesses who marry to give up imperial status if not marrying the emperor or another male member of the imperial family.)

== Name ==
During his reign, Akihito was never referred to by his own name, but instead as "His Majesty the Emperor" (天皇陛下, Tennō Heika) which may be shortened to "the Emperor" (天皇, Tennō) or "His Majesty" (陛下, Heika). The era of Akihito's reign from 1989 to 2019 bore the era name Heisei (平成), and according to custom he will be posthumously renamed Emperor Heisei (平成天皇, Heisei Tennō) as the 125th emperor of Japan by order of the Cabinet.

Following his abdication, Akihito is referred to by the title of Jōkō (上皇), officially translated as "Emperor Emeritus".

== Early life and education ==
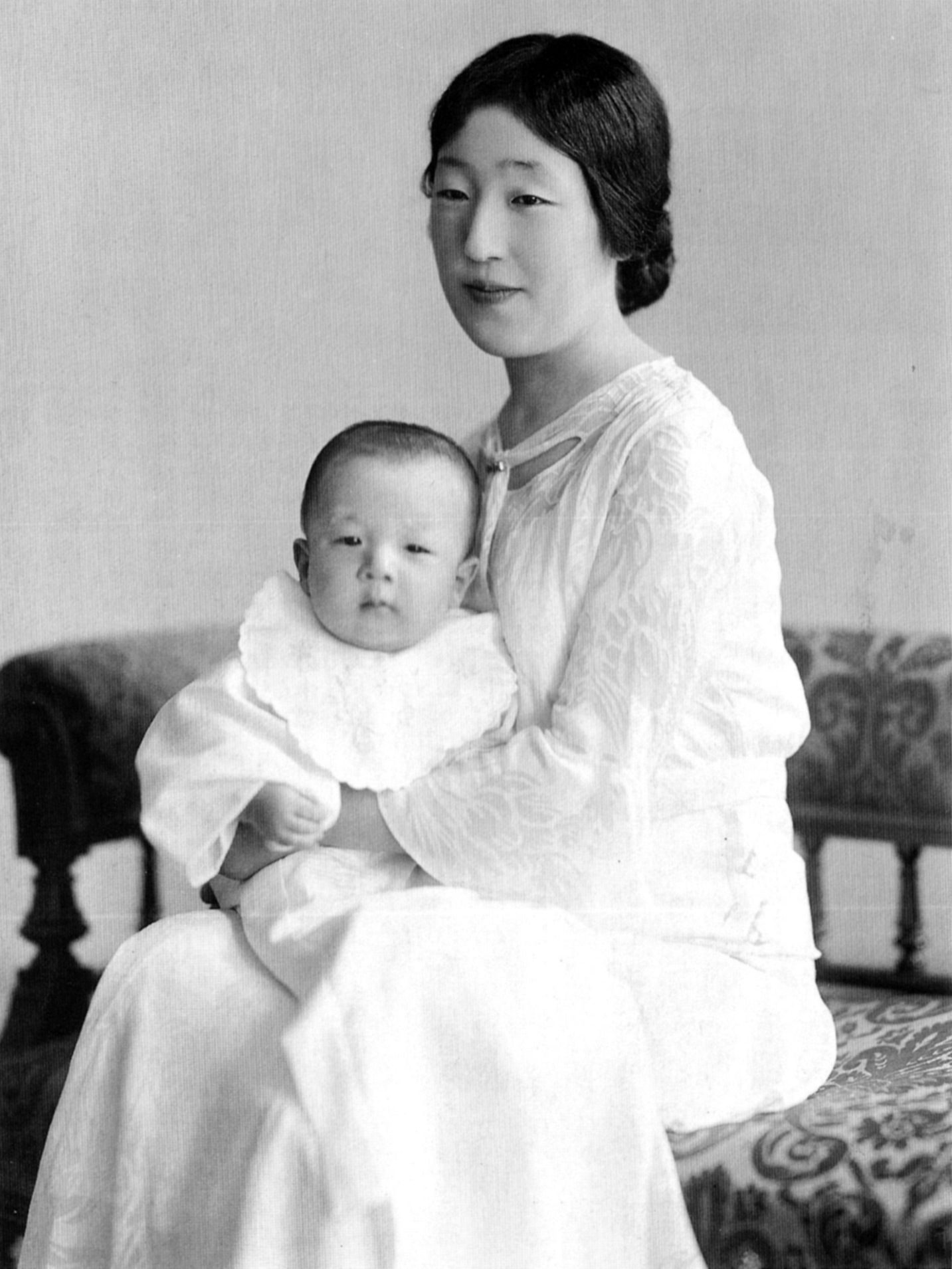
One year old Akihito with his mother Empress Nagako, 1934

Prince Akihito (明仁親王, Akihito Shinnō) was born on 23 December 1933 at 6:39 am in the Tokyo Imperial Palace as the fifth child and eldest son of Emperor Hirohito and Empress Kōjun. Titled Prince Tsugu (継宮, Tsugu-no-miya) as a child, Akihito was educated by private tutors prior to attending the elementary and secondary departments of the Peers' School (Gakushūin) from 1940 to 1952. At the request of his father, he did not receive a commission as an army officer, unlike his predecessors.

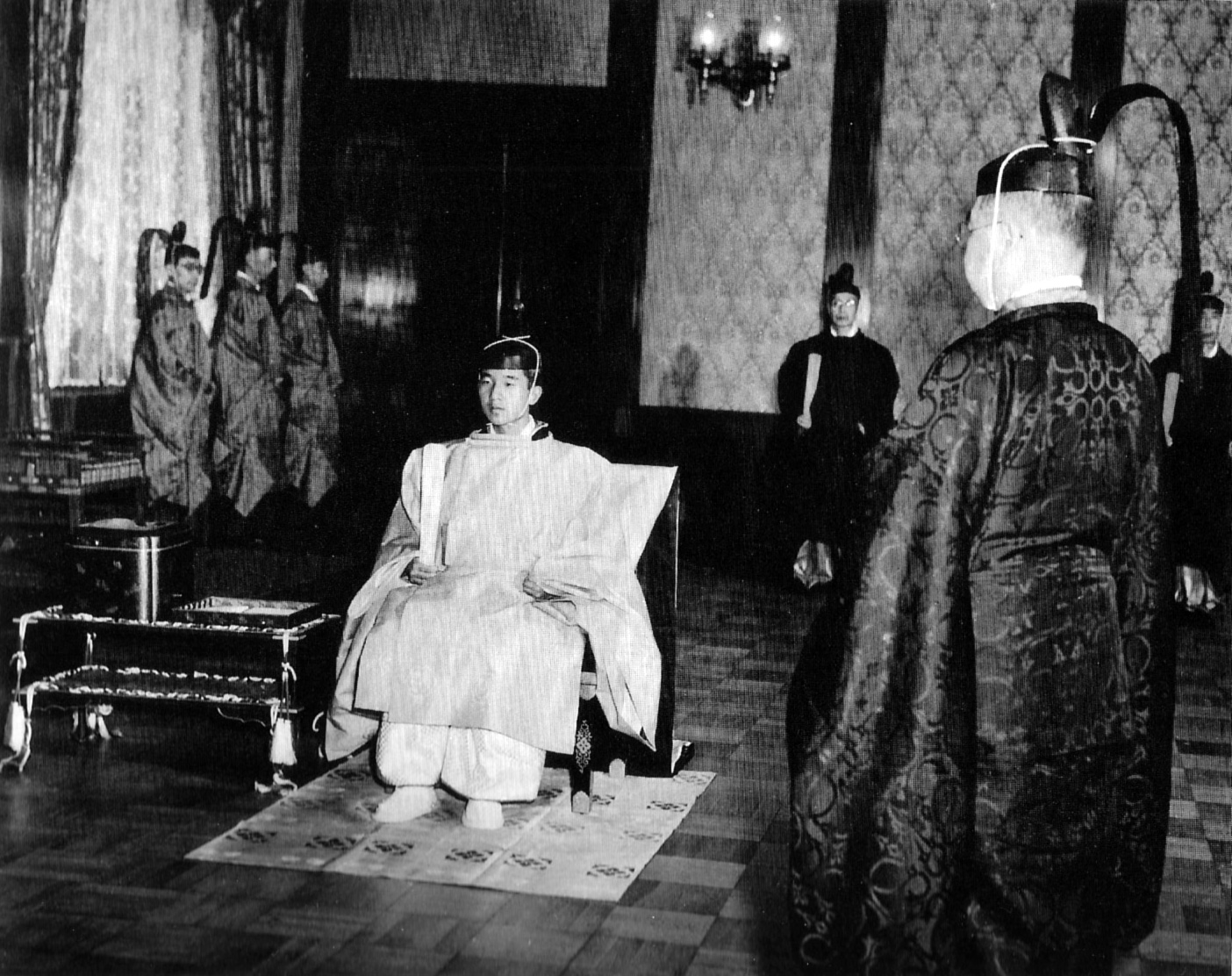
Akihito being invested as Crown Prince, 1952

During the American firebombing raids on Tokyo in March 1945 during World War II, Akihito and his younger brother Prince Masahito were evacuated from the city. Akihito was tutored in the English language and Western manners by Elizabeth Gray Vining during the Allied occupation of Japan, and later briefly studied at the department of political science at Gakushuin University in Tokyo, though he never received a degree.

Akihito was the heir apparent to the Chrysanthemum Throne from birth. His formal investiture as crown prince (立太子の礼, Rittaishi-no-rei) took place at the Tokyo Imperial Palace on 10 November 1952. In June 1953, Akihito represented Japan at the coronation of Queen Elizabeth II in London on his first journey abroad. He later completed his university education as a special student in 1956.

== Marriage and family ==
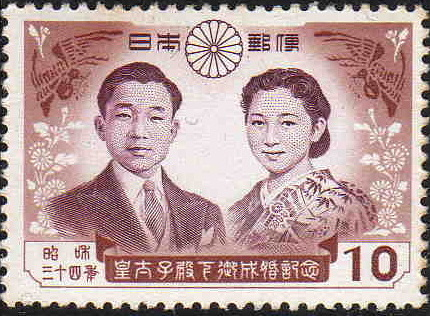
A Japanese stamp commemorating the imperial wedding, 1959

In August 1957, Akihito met Michiko Shōda on a tennis court at Karuizawa near Nagano. Initially, there was little enthusiasm for the couple's relationship; Michiko Shōda was considered too low class for the young Crown Prince and had been educated in a Catholic environment. Therefore, in September 1958, she was sent away to Brussels to attend an international conference of the Alumnae du Sacré-Cœur. The Crown Prince was determined to keep in contact with his girlfriend but did not want to create a diplomatic incident. Therefore, he contacted the young King Baudouin of Belgium to send his messages directly to his loved one. Baudouin later negotiated the marriage of the couple with the Emperor, directly stating that if the Crown Prince was happy with Michiko, he would be a better emperor later on.

The Imperial Household Council formally approved the engagement of the Crown Prince to Michiko Shōda on 27 November 1958. The announcement of Crown Prince Akihito's engagement and forthcoming marriage to Michiko Shōda drew opposition from traditionalist groups, because Shōda was from a Catholic family. Although she was never baptized, she had been educated in Catholic schools and seemed to share her parents' faith. Rumours also speculated that Prince Akihito's mother, Empress Kōjun had opposed the engagement. At that time, the media presented their encounter as a real "fairy tale", or the "romance of the tennis court". It was the first time a commoner had married into the Imperial Family, breaking more than 2,600 years of tradition. The engagement ceremony took place on 14 January 1959, and the marriage on 10 April 1959.

The couple have three children (two sons and a daughter):

1. Naruhito, Prince Hiro (浩宮徳仁親王, Hiro-no-miya Naruhito Shinnō; born 23 February 1960 at Imperial Household Agency Hospital in Tokyo Imperial Palace, Tokyo)
2. Fumihito, Prince Aya (礼宮文仁親王, Aya-no-miya Fumihito Shinnō; born 30 November 1965 at Imperial Household Agency Hospital in Tokyo Imperial Palace, Tokyo)
3. Sayako, Princess Nori (紀宮清子内親王, Nori-no-miya Sayako Naishinnō; born 18 April 1969 at Imperial Household Agency Hospital in Tokyo Imperial Palace, Tokyo), following her marriage to urban designer Yoshiki Kuroda on 15 November 2005, Princess Nori gave up her imperial title and left the Imperial Family as required by 1947 Imperial Household Law, took the surname of her husband and became known as "Sayako Kuroda" (黒田清子, Kuroda Sayako).

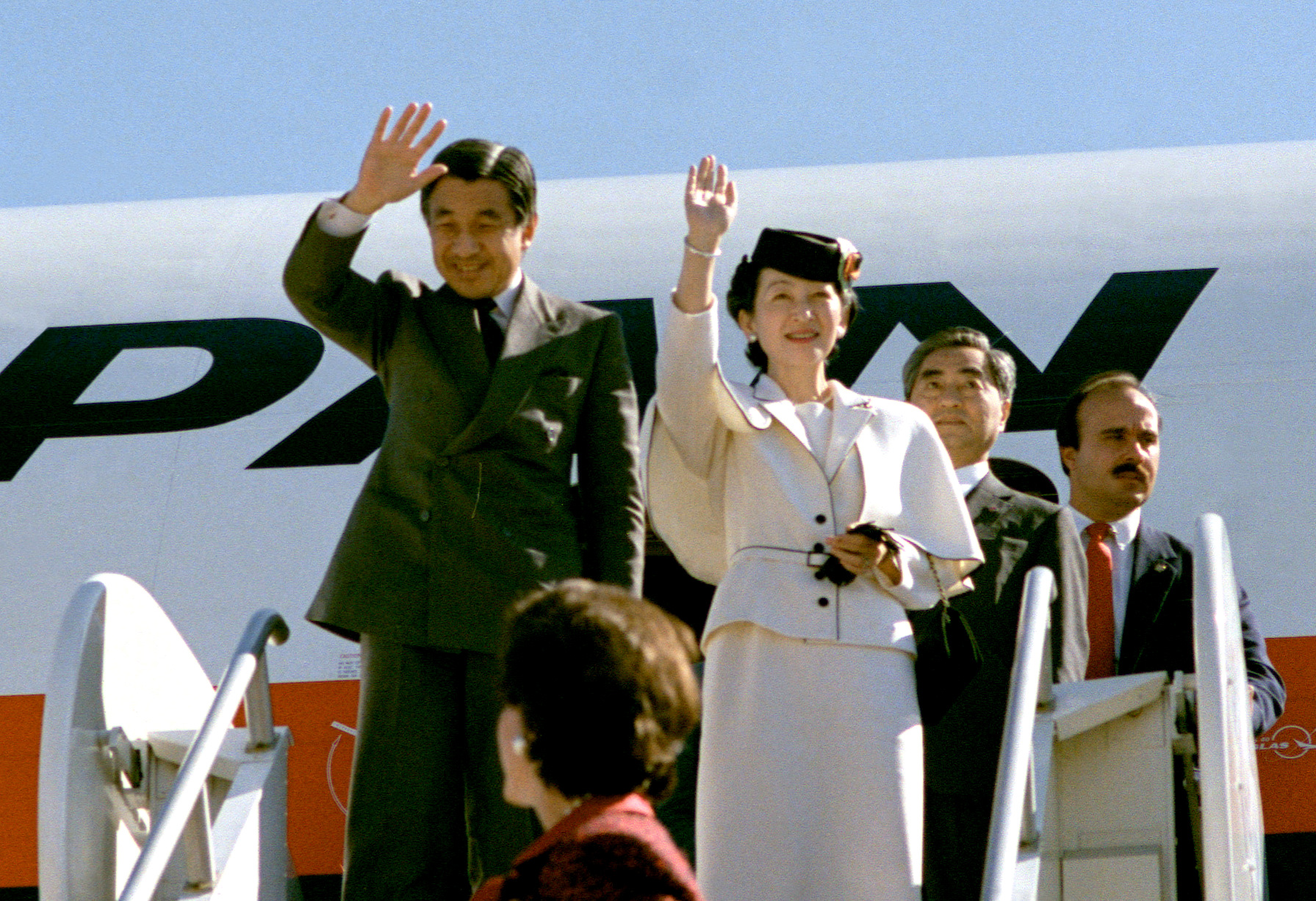
Akihito and Michiko arriving at Andrews Air Force Base in their last foreign visit as crown prince and princess, 1987 (Shōwa 62)

Crown Prince Akihito and Crown Princess Michiko made official visits to thirty-seven countries. As an Imperial Prince, Akihito compared the role of Japanese royalty to that of a robot. He expressed the desire to help bring the Imperial family closer to the people of Japan.

== Reign ==
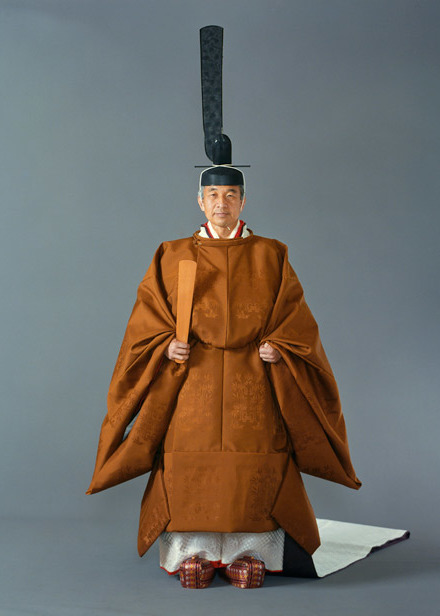
Emperor Akihito wearing the sokutai at his enthronement ceremony, 1990

Upon the death of Emperor Hirohito on 7 January 1989, Akihito acceded to the throne, becoming the 125th Emperor of Japan. Owing to his father being the longest-reigning emperor in Japanese history, Akihito was the third oldest to ascend the Chrysanthemum Throne in history; he was 55 years old at the time. The enthronement ceremony took place on 12 November 1990. In 1998, during a state visit to the United Kingdom, he was invested with the Order of the Garter.

Following his accession, he began issuing several wide-ranging statements of remorse to Asian countries, for their suffering under Japanese occupation, beginning with an expression of remorse to China made in April 1989, three months after the death of his father, Emperor Hirohito. In October 1992, Akihito visited China, the first visit to China by a Japanese emperor. The visit marked a significant improvement in the China–Japan relationship.

On 23 December 2001, during his annual birthday meeting with reporters, the Emperor, in response to a reporter's question about tensions with South Korea, remarked that he felt a kinship with Koreans and went on to explain that, in the Shoku Nihongi, the mother of Emperor Kammu (736–806) is related to Muryeong of Korea, King of Baekje, a fact that was considered taboo for discussion.

In June 2005, the Emperor and Empress visited the island of Saipan (part of the Northern Mariana Islands, a U.S. territory), the site of a battle in 1944 during World War II. Akihito offered prayers and flowers at several memorials, honouring not only the Japanese who died, but also American servicemen, Korean labourers, and local islanders. It was the first trip by a Japanese monarch to a World War II battlefield abroad. The Saipan journey was received with high praise by the Japanese people, as were the Emperor's visits to war memorials in Tokyo, Hiroshima Prefecture, Nagasaki Prefecture and Okinawa Prefecture in 1995.

After succeeding to the throne, Akihito made an effort to bring the Imperial family closer to the Japanese people. He and Michiko made official visits to eighteen countries and to all forty-seven Japanese prefectures. Akihito has never visited Yasukuni Shrine, continuing his predecessor's boycott from 1978, due to its enshrinement of war criminals.

On 6 September 2006, the Emperor celebrated the birth of his first grandson, Prince Hisahito, the third child of the Emperor's younger son. Prince Hisahito was the first male heir born to the Japanese imperial family in 41 years (since his father Prince Akishino) and could avert the Japanese imperial succession crisis, as the only child of the Emperor's elder son, the then Crown Prince Naruhito, is his daughter, Princess Aiko, who is not eligible for the throne under Japan's male-only succession law. The birth of Prince Hisahito meant that proposed changes to the law to allow Aiko to ascend the throne were dropped.

In response to the 2011 Tōhoku earthquake and tsunami which also triggered the Fukushima nuclear accident, the Emperor made a historic televised appearance urging his people not to give up hope and to help each other.

=== Constitutional role ===
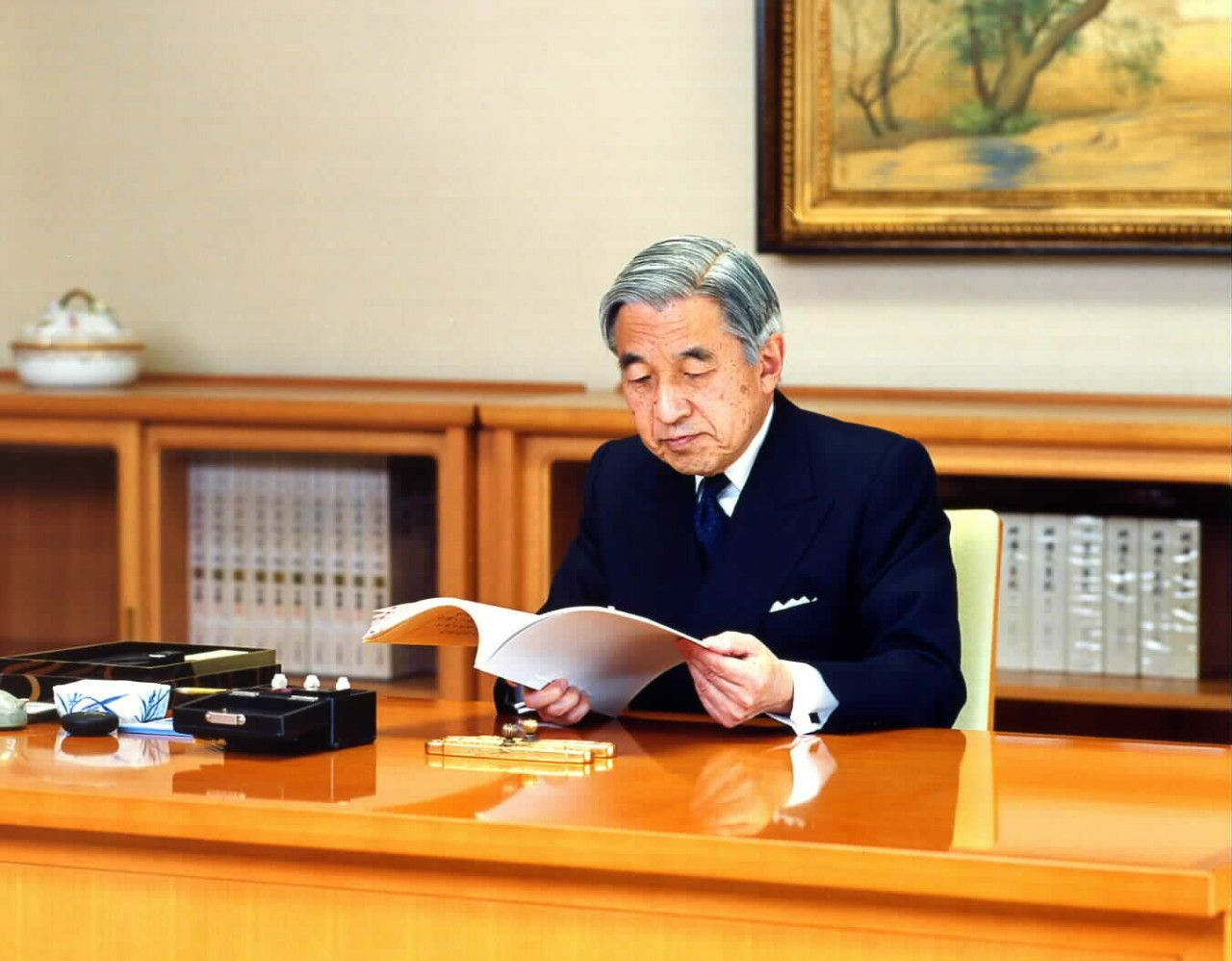
Emperor Akihito performs official duties, 2003

Under the Constitution of Japan, Akihito's role was entirely representative and ceremonial in nature, without even a nominal role in government; indeed, he was not allowed to make political statements. He was limited to acting in matters of state as delineated in the Constitution. Even in those matters, he was bound by the requirements of the Constitution and the binding advice of the Cabinet. For instance, while he formally appointed the Prime Minister, he was required to appoint the person designated by the Diet.

== Abdication ==
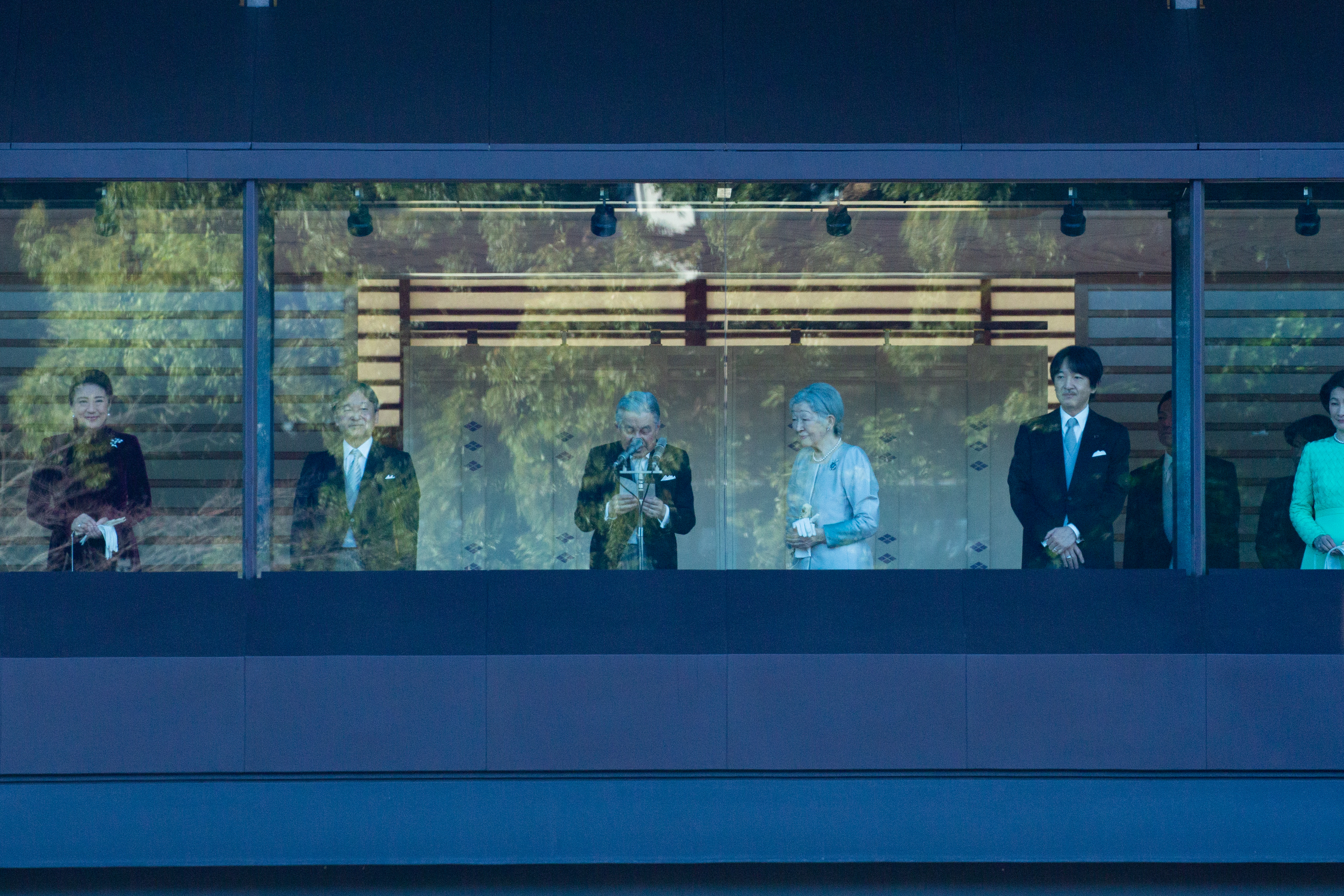
Akihito, at Chōwaden Reception Hall, giving his final New Year's address as Emperor to the Japanese people, January 2019

On 13 July 2016, national broadcaster NHK reported that the then 82-year-old Emperor intended to abdicate in favour of his eldest son Crown Prince Naruhito within a few years, citing his age. An abdication within the Imperial Family had not occurred since Emperor Kōkaku in 1817. However, senior officials within the Imperial Household Agency denied that there was any official plan for the monarch to abdicate. Abdication by the Emperor required an amendment to the Imperial Household Law, which had no provisions for such a move. On 8 August 2016, the Emperor gave a rare televised address, where he emphasized his advanced age and declining health; this address was interpreted as an implication of his intention to abdicate.

On 19 May 2017, the bill that would allow Akihito to abdicate was issued by the Cabinet of Japan. On 8 June 2017, the National Diet passed it, whereupon it became known as the Emperor Abdication Law. This commenced government preparations to hand the position over to Naruhito. Prime Minister Shinzo Abe announced in December 2017 that Akihito's abdication would take place at the end of 30 April 2019, and that Naruhito would become the 126th Emperor as of 1 May 2019.

== Post-abdication ==
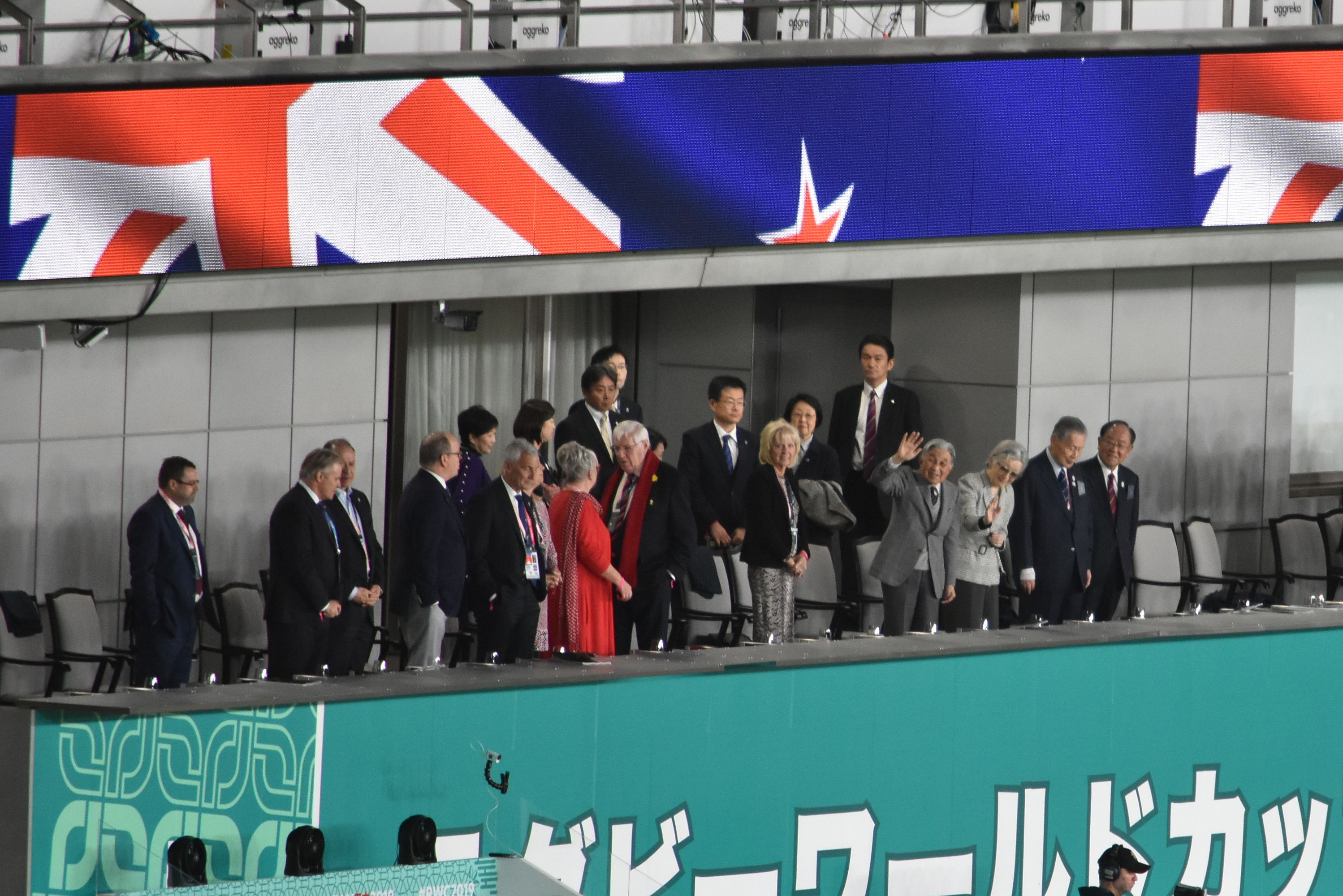
The Emperor Emeritus and Empress Emerita privately watch the third-place match (New Zealand vs Wales) of the 2019 Rugby World Cup held in Ajinomoto Stadium, November 2019

On 19 March 2020, Akihito and his wife moved out of the Imperial Palace, marking their first public appearance since his abdication. On 31 March, they moved in to the Takanawa Residence.

In December 2021, Akihito celebrated his 88th birthday (米寿, Bēju), making him the longest-living verifiable Japanese emperor in recorded history, ahead of his father. His daily routine is said to include morning and evening walks with his wife, reading and visits to an imperial biology institute.

In August 2023, Akihito and Michiko visited the tennis court where they first met and interacted with members of the organization responsible for its upkeep.

With the death of Princess Yuriko in November 2024, Akihito became the oldest living member of the Japanese imperial family.

== Health ==
Emperor Akihito underwent surgery for prostate cancer on 14 January 2003. Later in 2011 he was admitted to hospital suffering from pneumonia. In February 2012, it was announced that the Emperor would be having a coronary examination; he underwent successful heart bypass surgery on 18 February 2012. In July 2018, he suffered from nausea and dizziness due to insufficient blood flow to his brain. In January 2020, he temporarily lost consciousness and collapsed at his residence, though "no abnormalities" were detected in his brain. He was diagnosed with heart failure in July 2022. In 2025, Akihito was diagnosed with myocardial ischemia and supraventricular tachycardia.

== Children ==
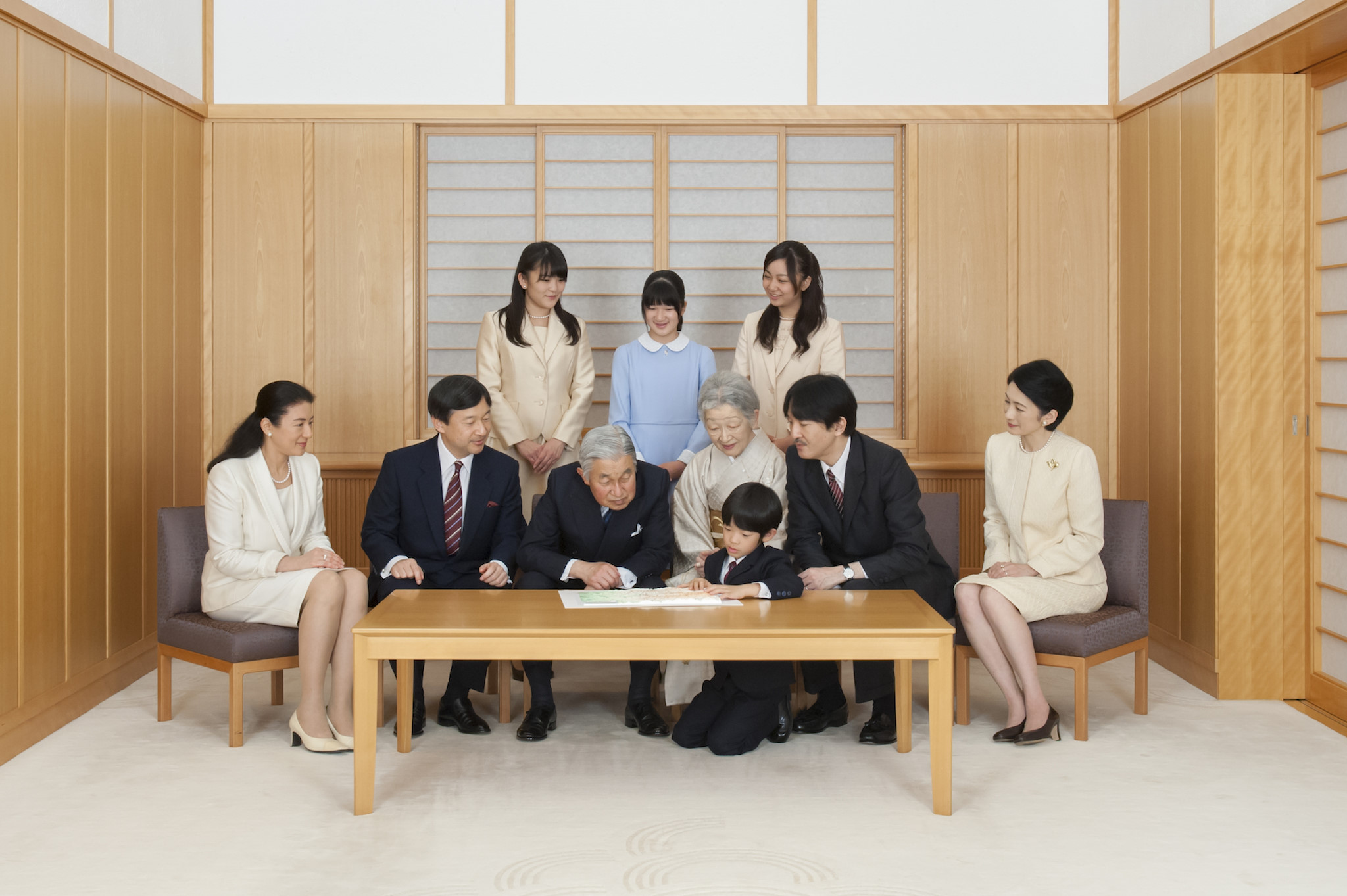
The Emperor and Empress with their family, 2013

Akihito and Michiko have two sons and a daughter.

Name	Birth	Marriage		Children
Name	Birth	Date	Spouse	Children
Naruhito, Emperor of Japan (Naruhito, Prince Hiro)	23 February 1960 (age 66)	9 June 1993	Masako Owada	Aiko, Princess Toshi
Fumihito, Crown Prince of Japan (Fumihito, Prince Aya)	30 November 1965 (age 60)	29 June 1990	Kiko Kawashima	Mako Komuro; Princess Kako; Prince Hisahito
Sayako Kuroda (Sayako, Princess Nori)	18 April 1969 (age 57)	15 November 2005	Yoshiki Kuroda	None

== Ichthyological research ==
In extension of his father's interest in marine biology, who published taxonomic works on the Hydrozoa, the Emperor Emeritus is a published ichthyological researcher, and has specialized in studies within the taxonomy of the family Gobiidae. He has written papers for scholarly journals such as Gene, Ichthyological Research, and the Japanese Journal of Ichthyology. He has also written papers about the history of science during the Edo and Meiji eras, which were published in Science and Nature. In 2005, a newly described goby was named Exyrias akihito in his honour, and in 2007 a genus Akihito of gobies native to Vanuatu also received his name. In 2021, the Imperial Household Agency announced Akihito had discovered two new species of goby fish. The discovery was catalogued in an English-language journal published by the Ichthyological Society of Japan.

In 1965, then-Crown Prince Akihito sent 50 Nile tilapia to Thai King Bhumibol Adulyadej in response to a request for fish that could solve malnutrition issues in the country. The species has since become a major food source in Thailand and a major export.

- Member of the Ichthyological Society of Japan
- (United Kingdom) Foreign member of the Linnean Society of London (1980)
- (United Kingdom) Honorary member of the Linnean Society of London (1986)
- (Australia) Research associate of the Australian Museum
- (United Kingdom) Honorary member of the Zoological Society of London (1992)
- Honorary member of the Research Institute for Natural Science of Argentina (1997)
- (Sweden) Honorary degree of the Uppsala University (2007)

== Honours ==
Country	Awards
Afghanistan	Order of the Supreme Sun
Austria	Decoration for Services to the Republic of Austria, Grand Star
Bahrain	Order of al-Khalifa, Collar
Belgium	Order of Leopold, Grand Cordon
Botswana	Presidential Order
Brazil	National Order of the Southern Cross, Grand Collar
Bulgaria	Order of the Balkan Mountains, Grand Cross
Cambodia	Royal Order of Cambodia, Grand Cross
Cameroon	Order of Valour, Grand Cordon
Chile	Order of the Merit of Chile, Collar
Colombia	Order of Boyaca, Grand Collar
Côte d'Ivoire	National Order of the Ivory Coast, Grand Cross
Czech Republic	Order of the White Lion, Member 1st Class (Civil Division) with Collar
Denmark	Order of the Elephant, Knight (8 August 1953)
Egypt	Order of the Nile, Collar
Estonia	Order of the Cross of Terra Mariana, The Collar of the Cross of Terra Mariana
Ethiopian Empire	Order of the Seal of Solomon, Grand Cordon (1960)
Finland	Order of the White Rose, Grand Cross with Collar
France	National Order of the Legion of Honour, Grand Cross
The Gambia	Order of the Republic of the Gambia, Grand Commander
Germany	Order of Merit of the Federal Republic of Germany, Grand Cross Special Class
Greece	Order of the Redeemer, Grand Cross
Hungary	Order of Merit of the Republic of Hungary, Grand Cross with Chain
Iceland	Order of the Falcon, Collar with Grand Cross Breast Star
Indonesia	Star of the Republic of Indonesia, Member 1st Class (Adipurna) (31 January 1962)
Ireland	Freedom of the City of Dublin, awarded by Lord Mayor of Dublin
Italy	Order of Merit of the Republic, Knight Grand Cross with Collar
Jordan	Order of al-Hussein bin Ali, Collar
Kazakhstan	Order of the Golden Eagle, Recipient
Kenya	Order of the Golden Heart, Chief
Kuwait	Order of Mubarak the Great, Collar
Latvia	Order of the Three Stars, Commander Grand Cross with Chain
Liberia	Order of the Star of Africa, Grand Cross Order of the Pioneers of Liberia, Grand Cordon
Lithuania	Order of Vytautas the Great, Golden Chain
Luxembourg	Order of the Gold Lion of the House of Nassau, Knight
Malawi	Order of the Lion, Grand Commander
Malaysia	Most Exalted Order of the Crown of the Realm, Honorary Recipient
Mali	National Order of Mali, Grand Cordon
Mexico	Mexican Order of the Aztec Eagle, Collar
Morocco	Order of Muhammad, Member Special Class
Nepal	Order of the Benevolent Ruler, Member (19 April 1960) King Birendra Investiture Medal (24 February 1975)
Netherlands	Order of the Netherlands Lion, Knight Grand Cross
Nigeria	Order of the Federal Republic, Grand Commander
Norway	Royal Norwegian Order of Saint Olav, Grand Cross with Collar (11 August 1953)
Oman	Order of Oman, Member 1st Class
Pakistan	Nishan-e-Pakistan, Member 1st Class
Panama	Order of Manuel Amador Guerrero, Collar
Peru	Order of the Sun, Grand Cross with Diamonds
Philippines	Philippine Legion of Honor, Chief Commander Order of Sikatuna, Grand Collar (Raja) Order of Lakandula, Grand Collar
Poland	Order of the White Eagle, Knight
Portugal	Military Order of Saint James of the Sword, Grand Collar (2 December 1993) Order of Prince Henry, Grand Collar (12 May 1998)
Qatar	Collar of Independence
Saudi Arabia	Badr Chain
Senegal	National Order of the Lion, Grand Cross
South Africa	Order of Good Hope, Grand Cross in Gold (4 July 1995)
Spain	Distinguished Order of the Golden Fleece, Knight Royal and Distinguished Spanish Order of Charles III, Grand Cross Royal and Distinguished Spanish Order of Charles III, Collar
Sweden	Royal Order of the Seraphim, Knight
Thailand	Most Auspicious Order of the Rajamitrabhorn, Knight Most Illustrious Order of the Royal House of Chakri, Knight King Bhumibol Adulyadej Diamond Jubilee Medal
Ukraine	Order of Prince Yaroslav the Wise, Member 1st Class
United Arab Emirates	Collar of the Federation
United Kingdom	Most Noble Order of the Garter, Stranger Knight Companion (985th member; 1998) Royal Victorian Order, Honorary Knight Grand Cross (1953) Queen Elizabeth II Coronation Medal (2 June 1953)
FR Yugoslavia ^{a}	Order of the Yugoslav Star, Yugoslav Great Star
Zaire ^{b}	National Order of the Leopard, Grand Cordon

^{a} FR Yugoslavia split into Serbia and Montenegro. As of 2006 this order is аbolished.
^{b} Zaire is now the Democratic Republic of the Congo.

Other awards

- The Royal Society King Charles II Medal
- Golden Pheasant Award of the Scout Association of Japan (1971)

== Overseas visits ==
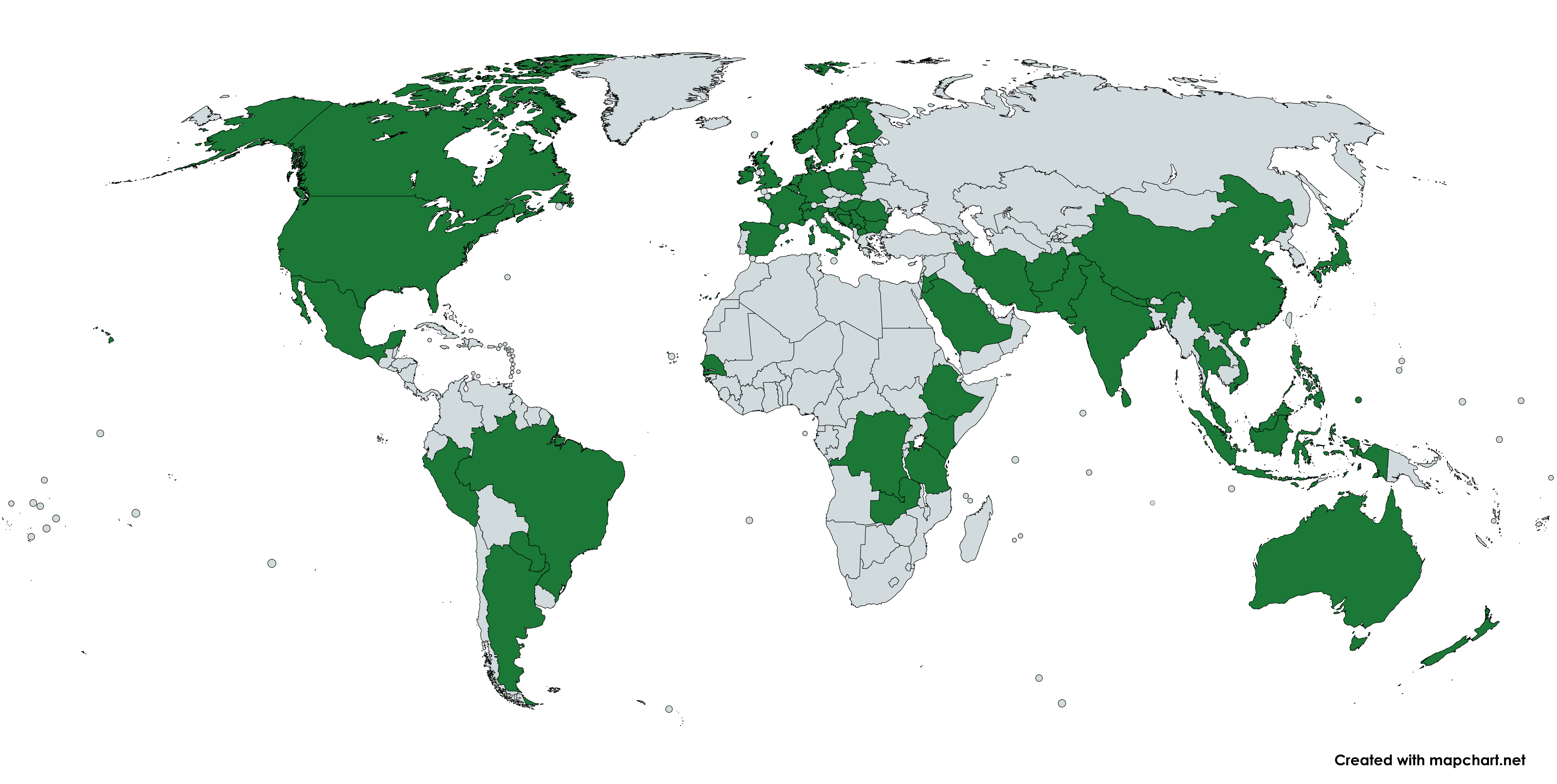
Map of Countries visited by Emperor Akihito on an official overseas visit

The following tables include official visits jointly made by the Emperor and Empress from 1991 to 2017. Although Empress Michiko has made two official visits on her own, in 2002 (to Switzerland) and 2014 (to Belgium), they did not include the Emperor and are not included in this list.

=== 1990s ===
Dates	Location(s)	Details
26 September – 6 October 1991	Thailand; Malaysia; Indonesia	"To foster friendly relations at the invitation of Thailand, Malaysia and Indonesia"
23–28 October 1992	China	"To foster friendly relations at the invitation of China"
6–9 August 1993	Belgium	Attended the funeral of King Baudouin of Belgium.
3–19 September 1993	Italy; Vatican City; Belgium; Germany	"To foster friendly relations at the invitation of Italy, Belgium and Germany"
10–26 June 1994	United States	"To foster friendly relations at the invitation of the United States"
2–14 October 1994	France; Spain	"To foster friendly relations at the invitation of France and Spain"
30 May – 13 June 1997	Brazil; Argentina	"To foster friendly relations at the invitation of Brazil and Argentina"
23 May – 5 June 1998	United Kingdom; Denmark	"To foster friendly relations at the invitation of the United Kingdom and Denmark"

=== 2000s ===
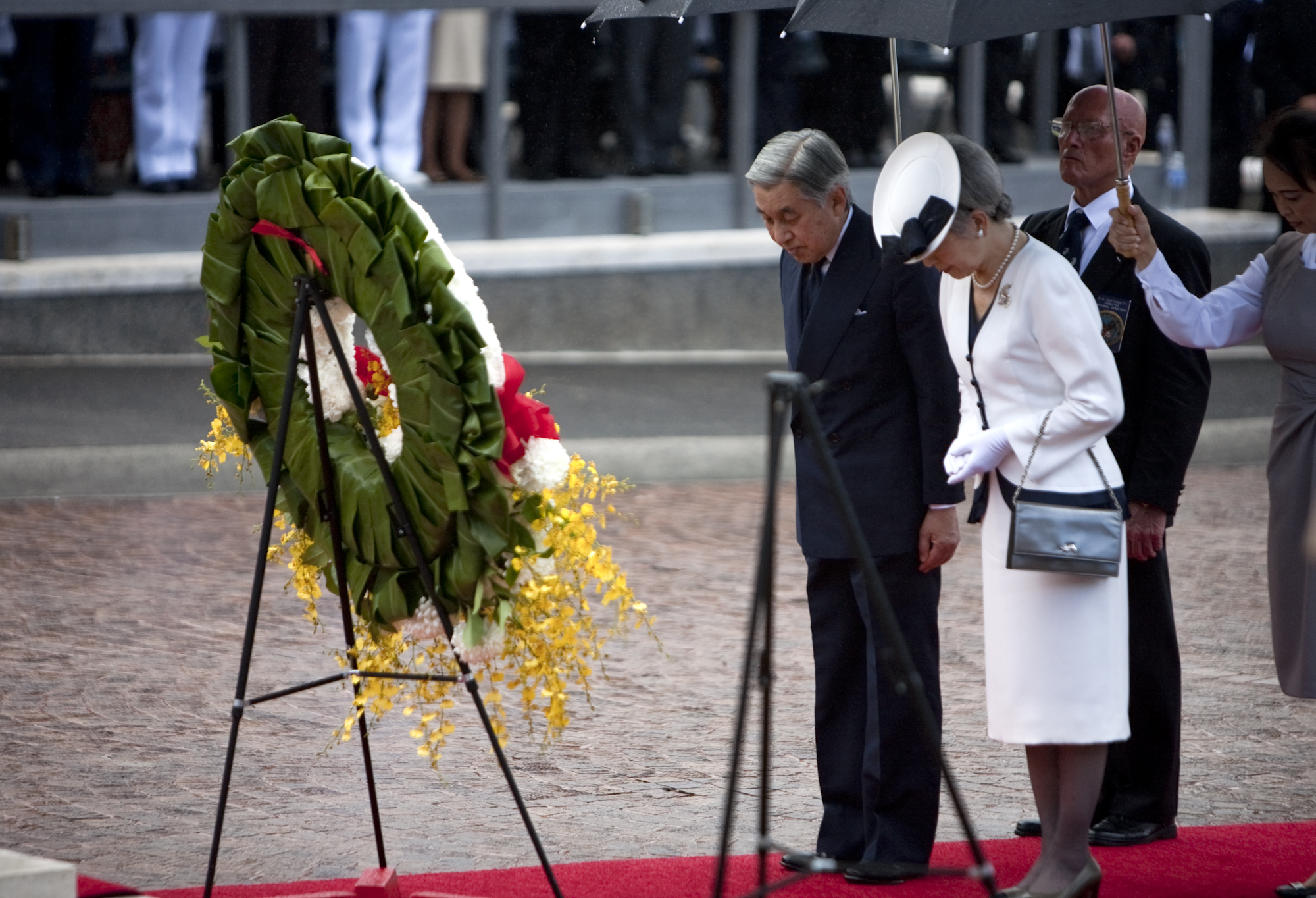
The Emperor and Empress bowing their heads for a moment of silence at the National Memorial Cemetery of the Pacific in Honolulu, Hawaii, 2009

Dates	Location(s)	Details
20 May – 1 June 2000	Netherlands; Sweden	"To foster friendly relations at the invitation of the Netherlands and Sweden"
6–20 July 2002	Czech Republic; Poland; Hungary	"To foster friendly relations at the invitation of Czech Republic, Poland and Hungary"
7–14 May 2005	Norway	"To foster friendly relations at the invitation of Norway"
27–28 June 2005	United States	Commemorations of the 60th anniversary of the end of World War II.
8–15 June 2006	Singapore; Thailand	Commemorations of the 40th anniversary of the establishment of diplomatic relations between Japan and Singapore; attended the 60th anniversary celebrations of the accession to the throne of King Bhumibol Adulyadej of Thailand.
21–30 May 2007	Sweden; Estonia; Latvia; Lithuania; United Kingdom	Invited by Sweden and the United Kingdom to mark the 300th birth anniversary of Carl von Linné as an honorary member of the Linnean Society; invited by Estonia, Latvia, and Lithuania to conduct a state visit.
3–14 July 2009	Canada	"To foster friendly relations at the invitation of Canada"
15–17 July 2009	United States	Visited Hawaii to mark the 50th anniversary of the Crown Prince Akihito Scholarship Foundation.

=== 2010s ===
Dates	Location(s)	Details
16–20 May 2012	United Kingdom	Attended a luncheon hosted by Queen Elizabeth II on the occasion of her Diamond Jubilee.
30 November – 6 December 2013	India	"To foster friendly relations at the invitation of India"
8–9 April 2015	Palau	Commemorations of the 70th anniversary of the end of World War II.
26–30 January 2016	Philippines	"To foster friendly relations on the occasion of the 60th anniversary of the normalization of diplomatic relations at the invitation of the Philippines"
28 February – 6 March 2017	Vietnam	"To foster friendly relations at the invitation of Vietnam"
5–6 March 2017	Thailand	Met with King Vajiralongkorn and paid respect to the remains of the late King Bhumibol Adulyadej.

== See also ==
- The Emperor's Birthday
- Imperial Household Agency
- Imperial House of Japan
- Japanese era name
- List of emperors of Japan

Akihito Imperial House of Japan Born: 23 December 1933
Japanese royalty
Preceded by Hirohito	Crown Prince of Japan; 1952–1989	Succeeded by Naruhito
Regnal titles
Preceded by Hirohito	Emperor of Japan; 7 January 1989 – 30 April 2019	Succeeded by Naruhito
