= Akihito (fish) =

Scientific classification
- Kingdom: Animalia
- Phylum: Chordata
- Class: Actinopterygii
- Division: Teleostei
- Order: Gobiiformes
- Family: Oxudercidae
- Subfamily: Sicydiinae
- Genus: Akihito; Watson, Keith & Marquet, 2007

Type species
- Akihito vanuatu Watson, Keith & Marquet, 2007

Genus of fishes

Akihito is a genus of gobies native to streams in Vanuatu.

== Etymology ==
This genus is named after Japanese Emperor Akihito who has contributed much to the study of gobies.

== Species ==
There are currently two recognized species in this genus:

- Akihito futuna Keith, Marquet & Watson, 2008 (Futuna's emperor)
- Akihito vanuatu Watson, Keith & Marquet, 2007 (Vanuatu's emperor)

== See also ==
- Exyrias akihito, species of the genus Exyrias named after Akihito
