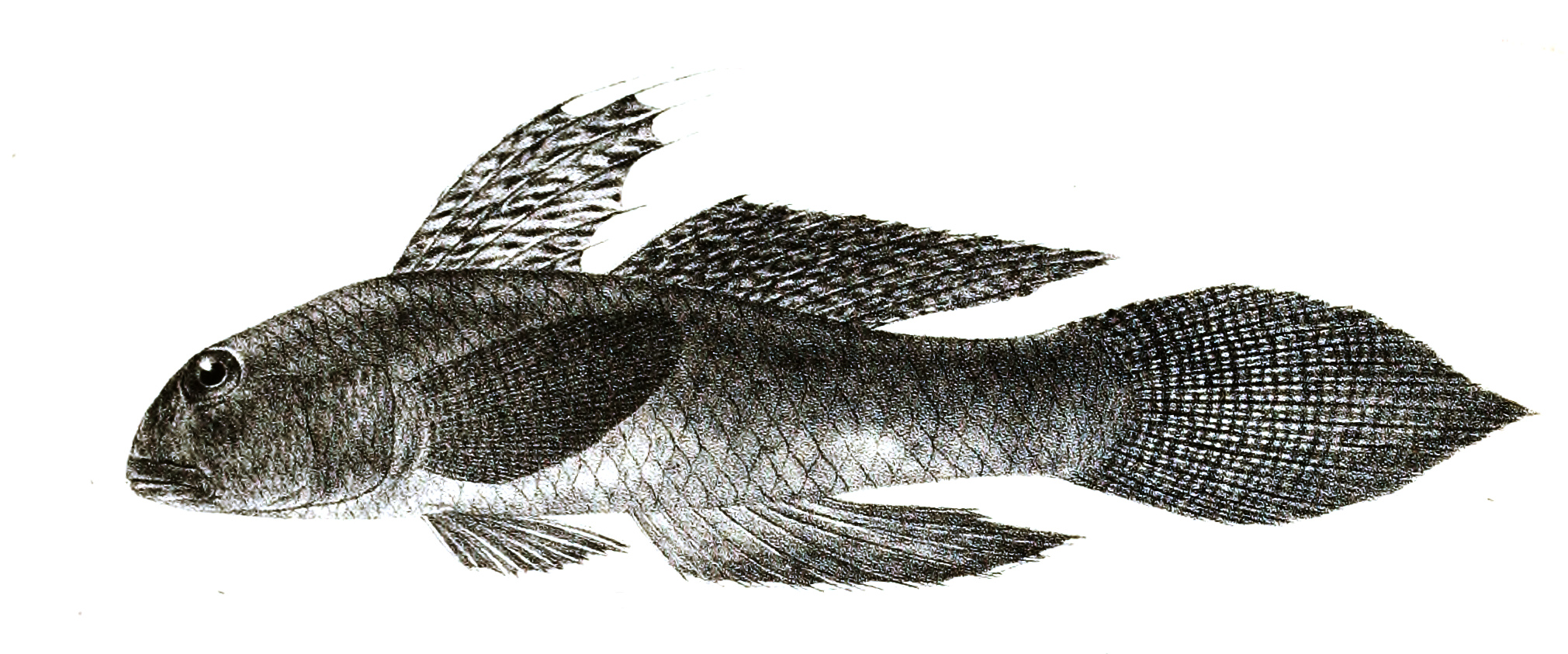
- Exyrias puntang

Scientific classification
- Kingdom: Animalia
- Phylum: Chordata
- Class: Actinopterygii
- Order: Gobiiformes
- Family: Gobiidae
- Genus: Exyrias; D. S. Jordan & Seale, 1906

Type species
- Gobius puntangoides Bleeker, 1853

= Exyrias =

Genus of fishes

Exyrias is a genus of fish in the family Gobiidae, mostly native to marine waters of the Indian Ocean and the western Pacific Ocean with one freshwater species (Exyrias volcanus) known from the Philippines.

== Species ==
There are currently five recognized species in this genus:

- Exyrias akihito G. R. Allen & J. E. Randall, 2005
- Exyrias belissimus (J. L. B. Smith, 1959) (mud reef-goby)
- Exyrias ferrarisi Murdy, 1985
- Exyrias puntang (Bleeker, 1851) (puntang goby)
- Exyrias volcanus (Herre, 1927)
