= Gene (journal) =

Scientific journal on genes and molecular biology

- Discipline: Genetics, molecular biology
- Language: English
- Edited by: Marianna Kruithof-de Julio

Publication details
- History: 1976-present
- Publisher: Elsevier
- Frequency: 42/year
- Impact factor: 3.5 (2022)

Standard abbreviations
- ISO 4: Gene

Indexing
- CODEN: GENED6
- ISSN: 0378-1119 (print); 1879-0038 (web)
- LCCN: 77643986
- OCLC no.: 614874224

Links
- Journal homepage; Online archive

Gene is a peer-reviewed scientific journal in genetics and molecular biology, focusing on the cloning, structure, function, as well as the biomedical and biotechnological importance of genes. The scope of the journal includes all biological organisms including viruses, prokaryotes, and eukaryotes. It is organized into topics, which include Human Genetics, Cancer Genetics, Neurogenetics, Animal Genetics, Genome Editing, Molecular Ecology, Plant Genetics, Parasitology and Virology, as well as Microbiology.

The journal is part of the Gene Family of journals and was established in 1976. It is published by Elsevier and the editor-in-chief is Marianna Kruithof-de Julio (University of Bern) The Gene Family of journals comprises the journals Gene, Gene Reports, Human Gene, and Plant Gene. According to the Journal Citation Reports, the journal has a 2022 impact factor of 3.5.

== History ==
The journal's first issue was published in 1976 by Elsevier/North-Holland Biomedical Press. Gene was first intended to focus on recombination processes of genes and the properties of reconstructed genes and genomes, according to a letter written by Waclaw Szybalski in the first issue. Over the years, subspecialized publications on human and plant genetics, as well as a companion journal Gene Reports, which focuses on the regulation, expression, and evolution of genes and genetic material across a broad range of biological contexts have been split off.
