= Hirohito =

Emperor of Japan from 1926 to 1989

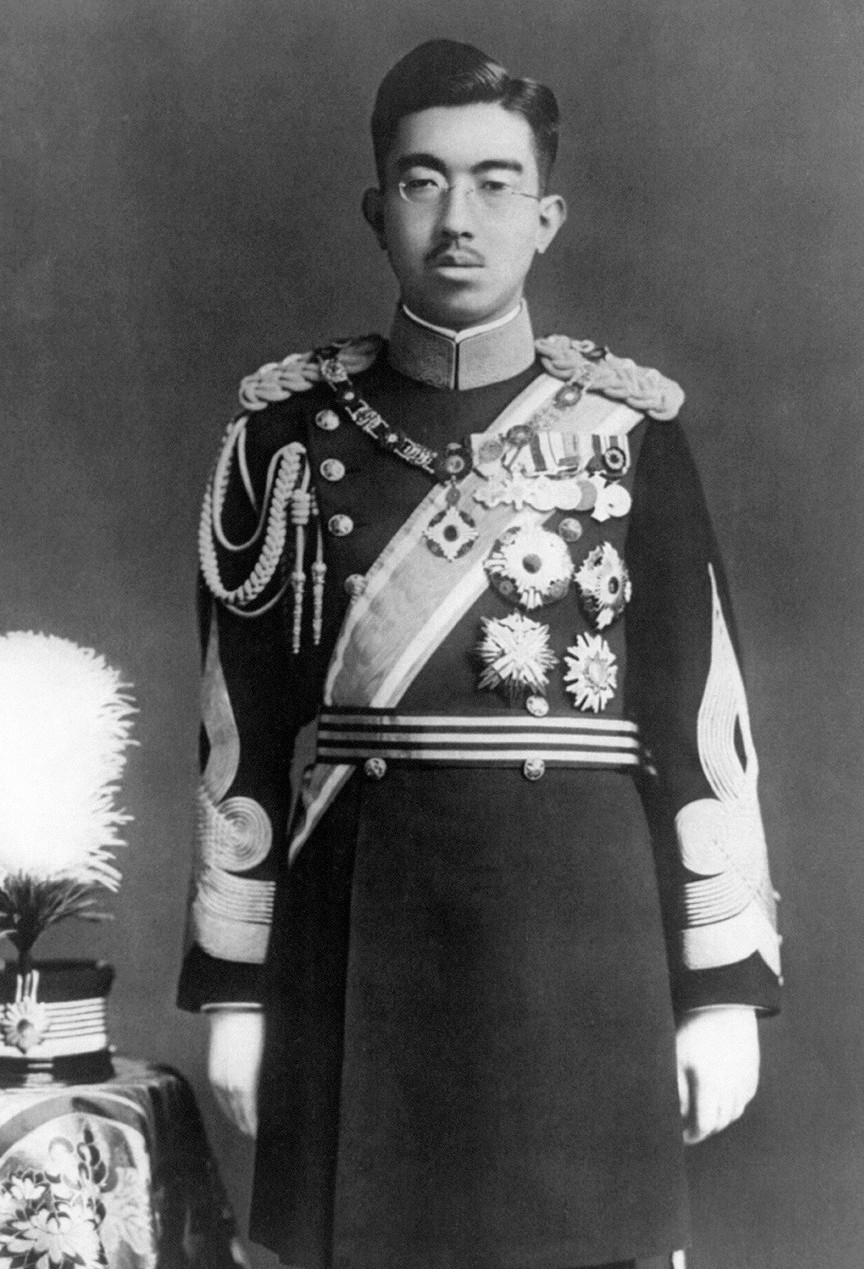
- Formal portrait, 1935

Emperor of Japan
- Reign: 25 December 1926 – 7 January 1989
- Enthronement: 10 November 1928
- Predecessor: Taishō
- Successor: Akihito

Sesshō of Japan
- Regency: 25 November 1921 – 25 December 1926
- Monarch: Taishō
- Born: Hirohito, Prince Michi (迪宮裕仁親王); 29 April 1901; Takanawa Imperial Residence, Tokyo, Empire of Japan
- Died: 7 January 1989 (aged 87); Fukiage Palace, Chiyoda, Tokyo, Japan
- Burial: 24 February 1989; Musashi Imperial Graveyard
- Spouse: Princess Nagako (m. 1924)
- Issue: Shigeko Higashikuni; Sachiko, Princess Hisa; Kazuko Takatsukasa; Atsuko Ikeda; Akihito, Emperor of Japan; Masahito, Prince Hitachi; Takako Shimazu
Era name and dates
- Shōwa: 25 December 1926 – 7 January 1989
Posthumous name
- Tsuigō: Emperor Shōwa (昭和天皇)
- House: Imperial House of Japan
- Father: Emperor Taishō
- Mother: Sadako Kujō
- Religion: Shinto
- Hirohito's voice Hirohito announcing the surrender of Japan to Allied forces Recorded 14 August 1945

Hirohito (29 April 1901 – 7 January 1989), also known by his posthumous name Emperor Shōwa, (Note: Japanese: 昭和天皇, romanized: Shōwa tennō) was Emperor of Japan from 25 December 1926 until his death in 1989. He is the longest-reigning non-legendary emperor in Japanese history and one of the longest-reigning monarchs in the world. The Shōwa era that corresponded to his reign was initially characterized by heightened Japanese nationalism and militarism, developments which culminated in Japan's entry into World War II as an Axis power. After Japan's defeat in the war and under pressure from the victorious Allied powers, he renounced his divinity as Emperor via the Humanity Declaration and sanctioned a new Constitution for Japan based on parliamentary government and pacifism.

Hirohito was born during the reign of his paternal grandfather, Emperor Meiji, as the first child of Crown Prince Yoshihito and Crown Princess Sadako (later Emperor Taishō and Empress Teimei). When Emperor Meiji died in 1912, Hirohito's father ascended the Chrysanthemum Throne, and Hirohito was proclaimed Crown Prince of Japan in 1916, making him the heir apparent. In 1921, he made an official visit to six European countries, marking the first time a Japanese crown prince had traveled abroad. Due to his father's ill health, Hirohito became Sesshō of Japan (regent) that same year. In 1924, he married Princess Nagako Kuni, with whom he later had seven children: Shigeko, Sachiko, Kazuko, Atsuko, Akihito, Masahito and Takako. He became emperor upon his father's death in 1926.

As Japan's head of state, Emperor Hirohito oversaw the rise of militarism in Japanese politics. In 1931, he raised no objection when Japan's Kwantung Army staged the Mukden incident as a pretext for the invasion of Manchuria. Following the onset of the Second Sino-Japanese War in 1937, tensions steadily grew between Japan and the United States. After Hirohito formally sanctioned his government's decision to go to war against the U.S. and its allies on 1 December 1941, Japan entered World War II upon its military's attack on Pearl Harbor as well as its invasion of American and European colonies in Asia and the Pacific. After the atomic bombings of Hiroshima and Nagasaki and the Soviet invasion of Japanese-occupied Manchuria and Korea, Hirohito called upon the Imperial Japanese Armed Forces (IJAF) to surrender in a radio broadcast on 15 August 1945. While historians agree Hirohito was involved to at least some extent in Japan's military strategy and war crimes during the conflict, the degree of that involvement remains disputed.

Following Japan's surrender, Emperor Hirohito was never prosecuted for war crimes at the International Military Tribunal for the Far East (IMTFE), even though the war had been waged in his name. After the surrender, Japan came under Allied occupation, administered primarily by the United States. The Supreme Commander for the Allied Powers, U.S. General Douglas MacArthur, believed that a cooperative emperor would facilitate a peaceful occupation and support U.S. postwar objectives. MacArthur therefore excluded any evidence from the tribunal that could have incriminated Hirohito or other members of the Imperial House of Japan. In 1946, Hirohito was pressured by the Allies to renounce his divinity. Under Japan's post-war constitution, drafted by U.S. officials and enacted in 1947, his role as emperor was redefined as "the symbol of the State and of the unity of the People". He died at Fukiage Ōmiya Palace, aged 87, of a duodenal cancer (adenocarcinoma). He was succeeded by his elder son, Akihito, beginning the Heisei era.

== Early life and education ==
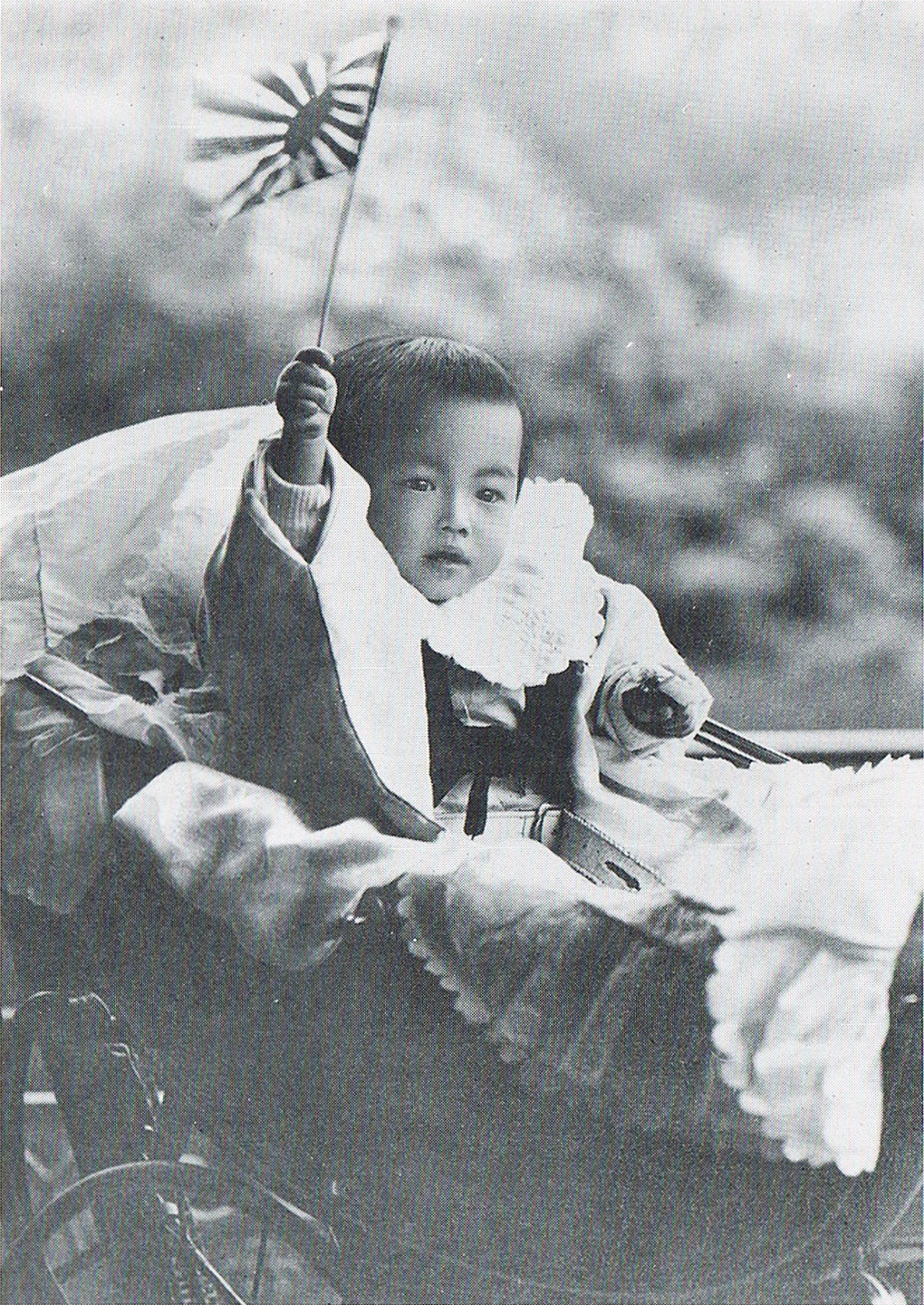
Hirohito as an infant in 1902

Hirohito was born on 29 April 1901 at Tōgū Palace in Aoyama, Tokyo during the reign of his grandfather, Emperor Meiji, the first son of 21-year-old Crown Prince Yoshihito (the future Emperor Taishō) and 16-year-old Crown Princess Sadako, the future Empress Teimei. He was the grandson of Emperor Meiji and Yanagiwara Naruko. His childhood title was Prince Michi.

Ten weeks after he was born, Hirohito was removed from the court and placed in the care of Count Kawamura Sumiyoshi, who raised him as his grandchild. At the age of 3, Hirohito and his brother Yasuhito were returned to court when Kawamura died – first to the imperial mansion in Numazu, Shizuoka, then back to the Aoyama Palace.

In 1908, he began elementary studies at the Gakushūin (Peers School). Emperor Mutsuhito then appointed General Nogi Maresuke to be the Gakushūin's tenth president as well as in charge of educating his grandson. After Nogi's death, his education was led by Fleet Admiral Togo Heihachiro and Naval Captain Ogasawara Naganari, who would later become his major opponents with regards to his national defense policy.

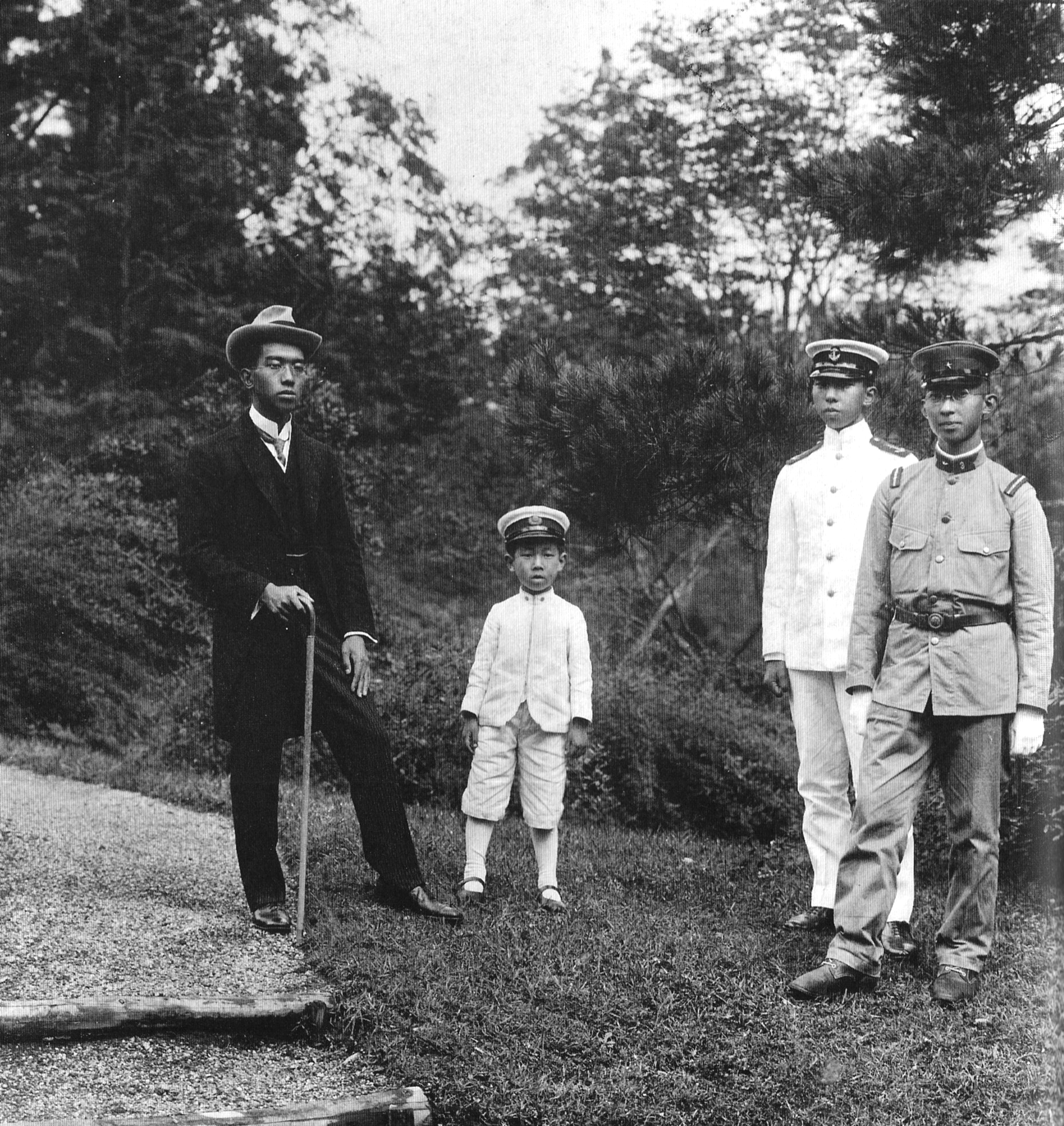
Emperor Taishō's four sons in 1921: Hirohito, Takahito, Nobuhito, and Yasuhito

During 1912, at the age of 11, Hirohito was commissioned into the Imperial Japanese Army as a Second Lieutenant and in the Imperial Japanese Navy as an Ensign. He was also bestowed with the Grand Cordon of the Order of the Chrysanthemum. When his grandfather, Emperor Meiji died on 30 July 1912, Yoshihito assumed the throne and his eldest son, Hirohito became heir apparent.

Shiratori Kurakichi, one of his middle-school instructors, was one of the personalities who deeply influenced the life of Hirohito. Kurakichi was a trained historian from Germany, imbibing the positivist historiographic trend by Leopold von Ranke. He was the one who inculcated in the mind of the young Hirohito that there is a connection between the divine origin of the imperial line and the aspiration of linking it to the myth of the racial superiority and homogeneity of the Japanese. The emperors were often a driving force in the modernization of their country. He taught Hirohito that the Empire of Japan was created and governed through diplomatic actions (taking into accounts the interests of other nations benevolently and justly).

== Crown Prince ==
On 2 November 1916, Hirohito was formally proclaimed crown prince and heir apparent. An investiture ceremony was not required to confirm this status.

=== Overseas travel ===
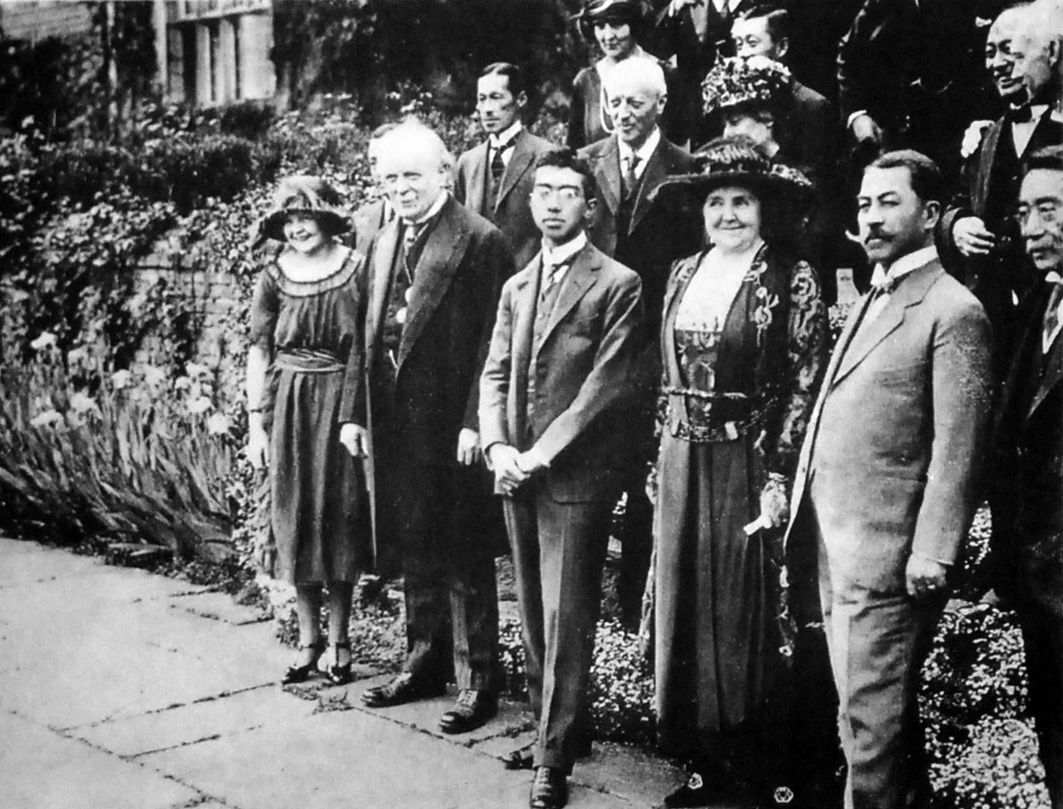
Prince Hirohito and British prime minister David Lloyd George, 1921

From 3 March to 3 September 1921 (Taisho 10), the Crown Prince made official visits to the United Kingdom, France, the Netherlands, Belgium, Italy, Vatican City and Malta (then a protectorate of the British Empire). This was the first visit to Europe by the Crown Prince. (Note: The first foreign trip by the Crown Prince was made in 1907 by the Crown Prince Yoshihito to the then Korean Empire. During that time, while it was considered a foreign country, it had become a colonial protectorate of Japan and would eventually be annexed.) Despite strong opposition in Japan, this was realized by the efforts of elder Japanese statesmen (Genrō) such as Yamagata Aritomo and Saionji Kinmochi.

The departure of Prince Hirohito was widely reported in newspapers. The Japanese battleship Katori was used, and departed from Yokohama, sailed to Naha, Hong Kong, Singapore, Colombo, Suez, Cairo, and Gibraltar. In April, Hirohito was present in Malta for the opening of the Maltese Parliament. After sailing for two months, the Katori arrived in Portsmouth on 9 May, on the same day reaching the British capital, London. Hirohito was welcomed in the UK as a partner of the Anglo-Japanese Alliance and met with King George V and Prime Minister David Lloyd George.

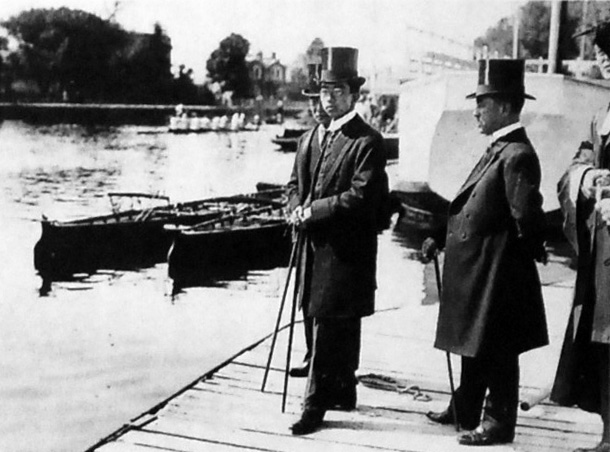
Hirohito watches a boat race at Oxford University in 1921

That evening, a banquet was held at Buckingham Palace, where Hirohito met with George V and Prince Arthur of Connaught. George V said that he treated his father like Hirohito, who was nervous in an unfamiliar foreign country, and that relieved his tension. The next day, he met Prince Edward (the future Edward VIII) at Windsor Castle, and a banquet was held every day thereafter. He toured the British Museum, the Tower of London, the Bank of England, Lloyd's Marine Insurance, Oxford University, Army University, and the Naval War College. He also enjoyed theater at the New Oxford Theatre and the Delhi Theatre.

At the University of Cambridge, he listened to Professor Joseph Robson Tanner's lecture on "Relationship between the British Royal Family and its People", and was awarded an honorary doctorate degree. He visited Edinburgh, Scotland, from 19 to 20 May, and was also awarded an Honorary Doctor of Laws at the University of Edinburgh. He stayed at the residence of John Stewart-Murray, 8th Duke of Atholl, for three days. On his stay with Stuart-Murray, the prince was quoted as saying, "The rise of Bolsheviks won't happen if you live a simple life like Duke Athol."

In Italy, he met with King Vittorio Emanuele III and others, attended official international banquets, and visited places such as the fierce battlefields of World War I.

=== Regency ===
After returning to Japan, Hirohito became Regent of Japan (Sesshō) on 25 November 1921, in place of his ailing father, who was affected by mental illness. In 1923 he was promoted to the rank of Lieutenant-Colonel in the army and Commander in the navy, and army Colonel and Navy Captain in 1925.

==== Visit to colonial Taiwan ====
Over 12 days in April 1923, Hirohito visited Taiwan, which had been a Japanese colony since 1895. This was a voyage his father, the then Crown Prince Yoshihito had planned in 1911 but never completed.

It was widely reported in Taiwanese newspapers that famous high-end restaurants served typical Chinese luxury dishes for the Prince, such as swallow's nest and shark fin, as Taiwanese cuisine. This was the first time an Emperor or a Crown Prince had ever eaten the local cuisine of a colony, or had foreign dishes other than Western cuisine abroad, thus exceptional preparations were required: The eight chefs and other cooking staff were purified for a week (through fasting and ritual bathing) before the cooking of the feast could begin. This tasting of "Taiwanese cuisine" of the Prince Regent should be understood as part of an integration ceremony of incorporating the colony into the empire, which can be seen as the context and purpose of Hirohito's Taiwanese visit.

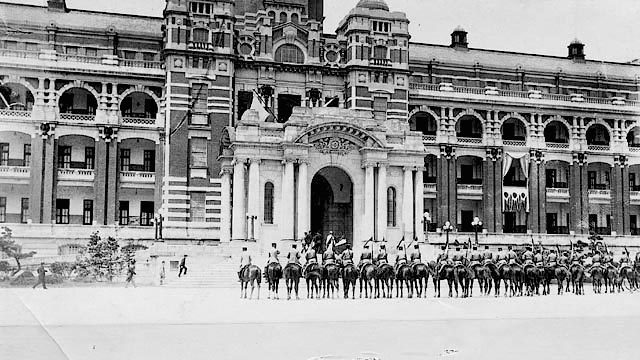
Cavalry welcome Prince Hirohito in Taipei, in front of the Office of the Governor-General

Having visited several sites outside of Taipei, Hirohito returned to the capital on the 24th and on 25 April, just one day before his departure, he visited the Beitou hotspring district of Taipei and its oldest facility. The original structure had been built in 1913 in the style of a traditional Japanese bathhouse. However, in anticipation of Hirohito's visit an additional residential wing was added to the earlier building, this time in the style of an Edwardian country house. The new building was subsequently opened to the public and was deemed the largest public bathhouse in the Japanese Empire. Crown Prince Hirohito was a student of science, and he had heard that Beitou Creek was one of only two hot springs in the world that contained a rare radioactive mineral. So, he decided to walk into the creek to investigate.

Naturally, concerned for a royal family member's safety, his entourage scurried around, seeking flat rocks to use as stepping stones. After that, these stones were carefully mounted and given the official name: “His Imperial Highness Crown Prince of Japan's Stepping Stones for River Crossing,” with a stele alongside to tell the story.

Crown Prince Hirohito handed his Imperial Notice to Governor-General Den Kenjiro and departed from Keelung on 26 April 1923.

==== Response to the Great Kantō Earthquake and assassination attempt ====
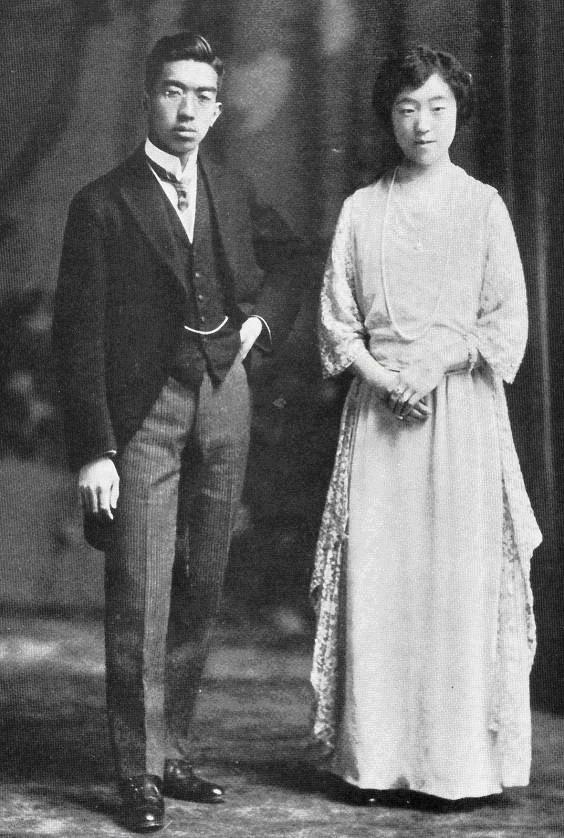
Prince Hirohito and his wife, Princess Nagako, in 1924

The Great Kantō earthquake devastated Tokyo on 1 September 1923, killing some 100,000 people and leveling vast areas. The city could be rebuilt drawing on the then massive timber reserves of Taiwan. In the aftermath of the tragic disaster, the military authorities saw an opportunity to annihilate the communist movement in Japan. During the Kantō Massacre, an estimated 6000 people, mainly ethnic Koreans, were annihilated. The backlash culminated in an assassination attempt by Daisuke Nanba on the Prince Regent on 27 December 1923 in the so-called Toranomon incident, but the attempt failed. During interrogation, the failed assassin claimed to be a communist and was executed.

== Marriage ==
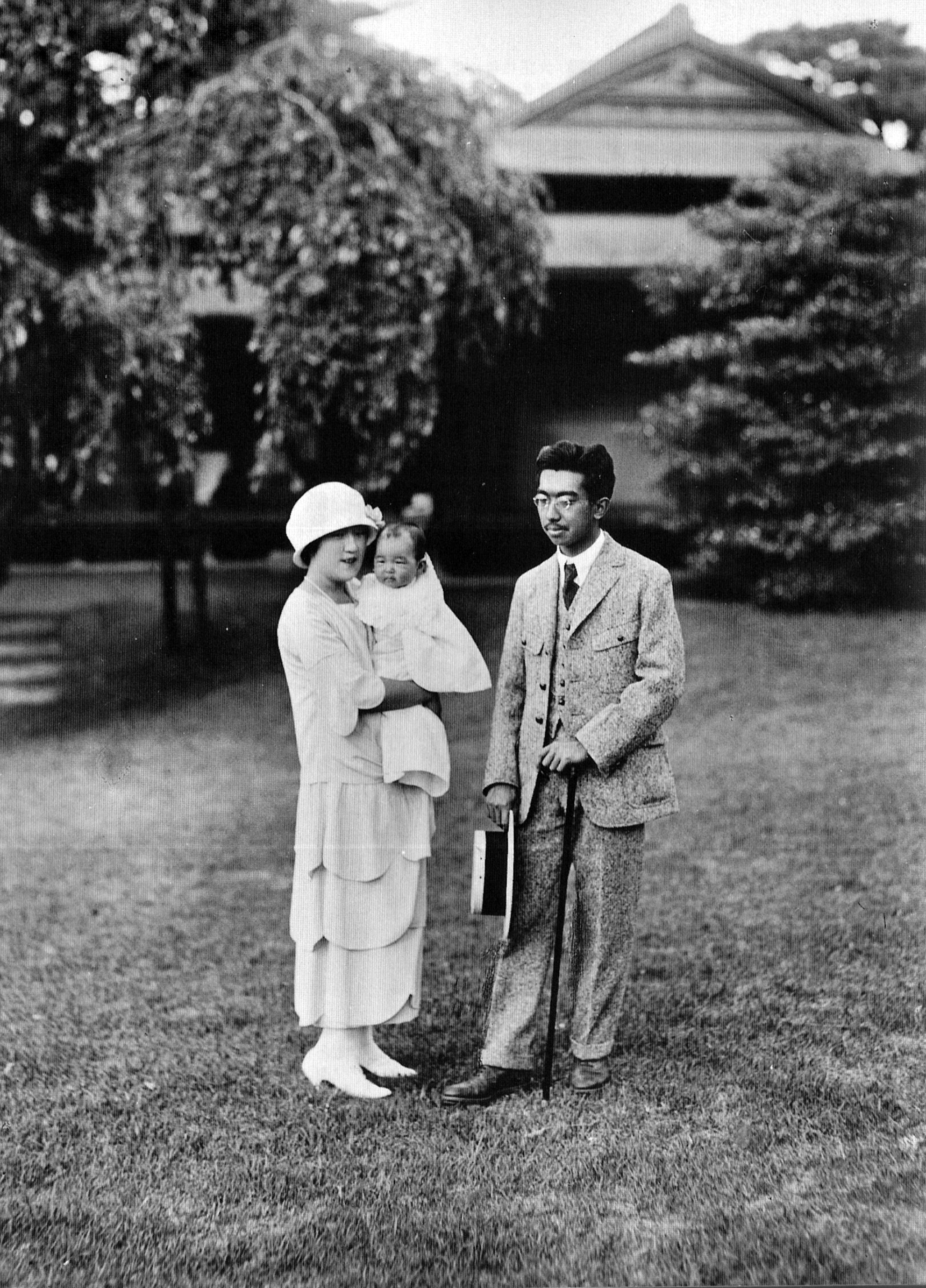
Hirohito with his wife and Shigeko, Princess Teru, their first child in 1926

Prince Hirohito married his distant cousin Princess Nagako Kuni, the eldest daughter of Prince Kuniyoshi Kuni, on 26 January 1924. They had seven children (two sons and five daughters) (see Issue).

The daughters who lived to adulthood left the imperial family as a result of the American reforms of the Japanese imperial household in October 1947 (in the case of Princess Shigeko) or under the terms of the Imperial Household Law at the moment of their subsequent marriages (in the cases of Princesses Kazuko, Atsuko, and Takako).

== Early reign and World War II ==
=== Accession ===
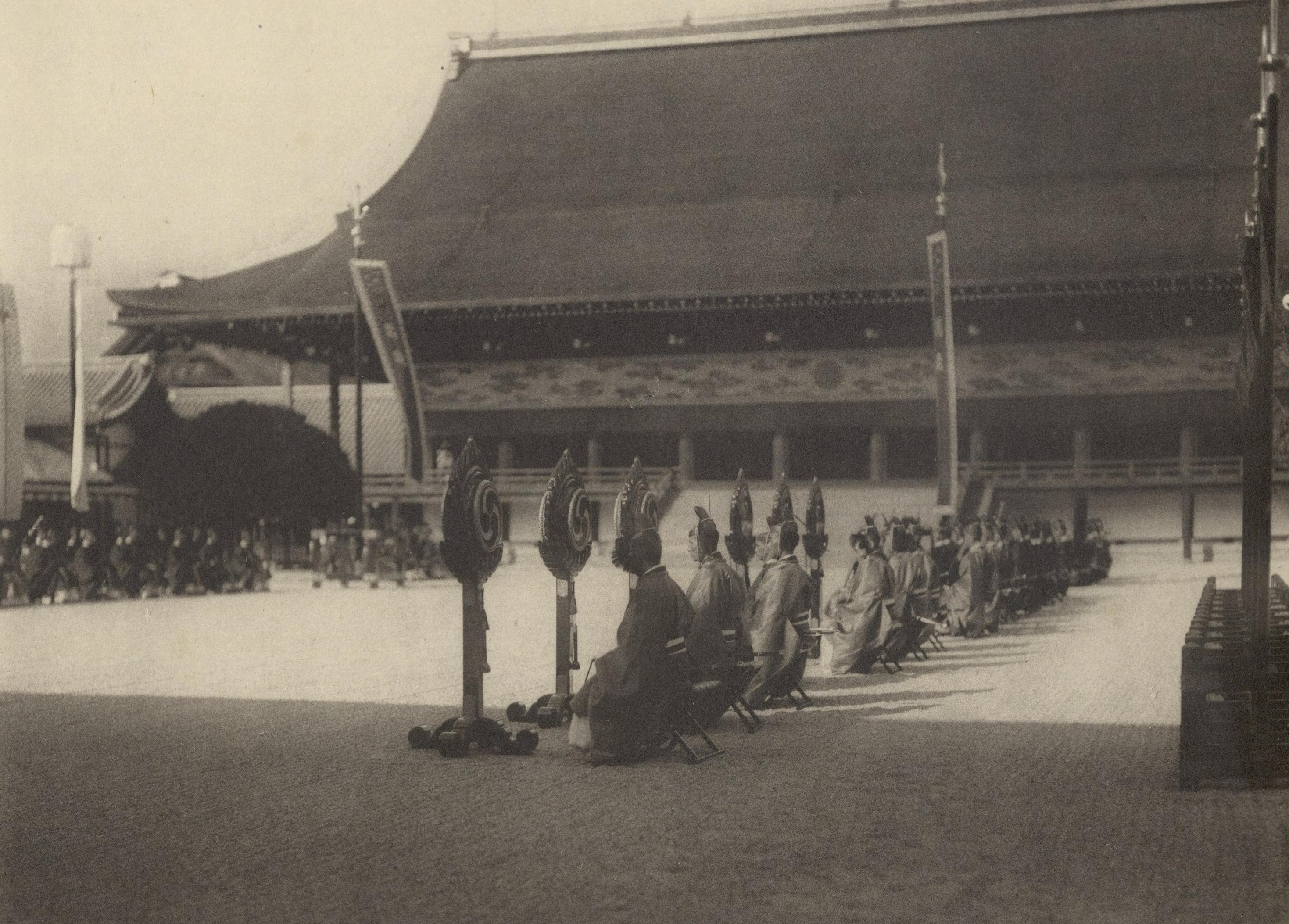
Ceremony of the Enthronement of Emperor Shōwa in Shishinden Hall

On 25 December 1926, Yoshihito died and Hirohito became emperor. The Crown Prince was said to have received the succession (senso). The Taishō era's end and the Shōwa era's beginning were proclaimed. The deceased Emperor was posthumously renamed Emperor Taishō within days. Following Japanese custom, the new Emperor was never referred to by his given name, but rather was referred to simply as "His Majesty the Emperor" which may be shortened to "His Majesty". In writing, the Emperor was also referred to formally as "The Reigning Emperor."

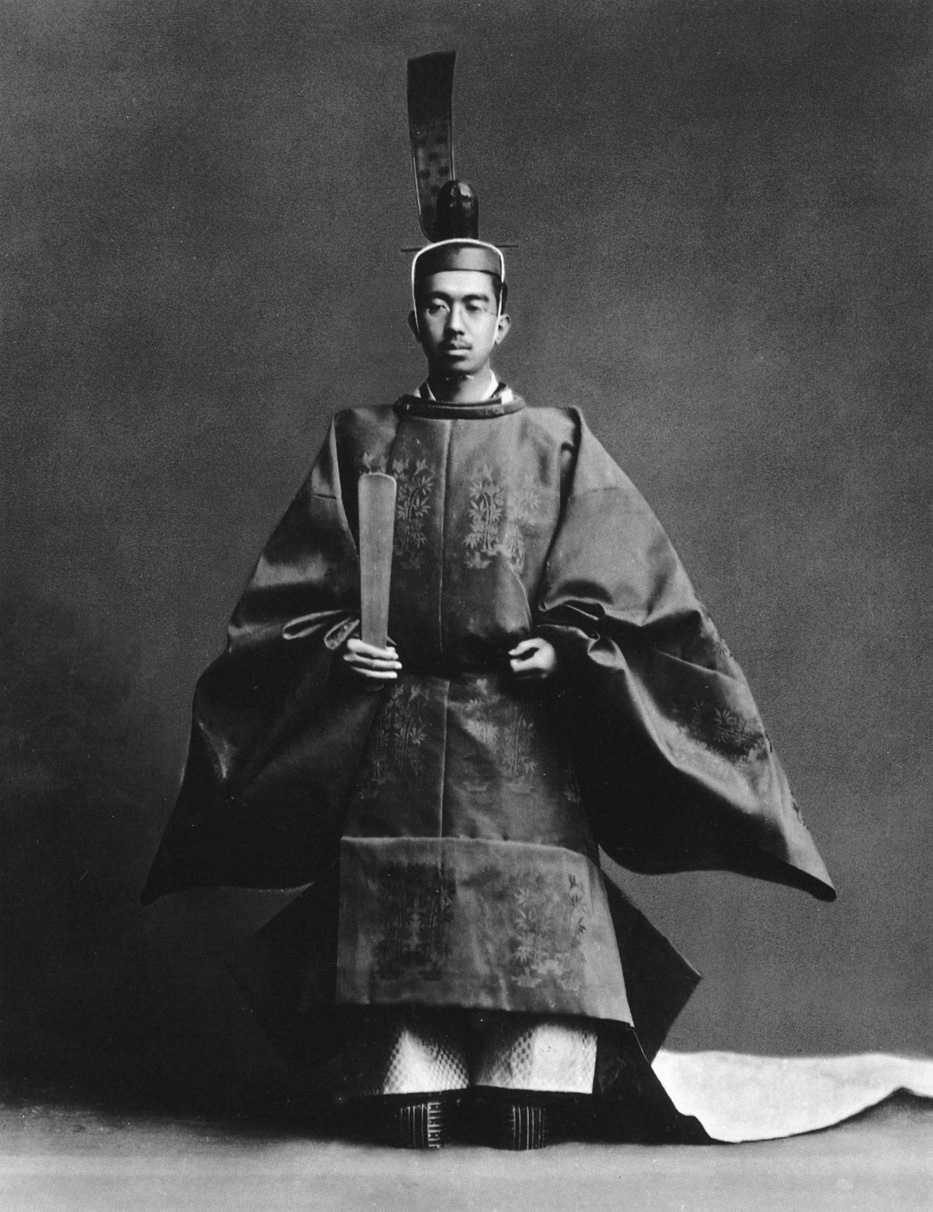
Emperor Hirohito after his enthronement ceremony in 1928, dressed in sokutai

In November 1928, Hirohito's accession was confirmed in ceremonies (sokui), which are conventionally identified as "enthronement" and "coronation" (Shōwa no tairei-shiki); but this formal event would have been more accurately described as a public confirmation that he possessed the Japanese Imperial Regalia, also called the Three Sacred Treasures, which have been handed down through the centuries. However, his enthronement events were planned and staged under the economic conditions of a recession whereas the 55th Imperial Diet unanimously passed $7,360,000 for the festivities.

=== Early reign ===
The first part of Hirohito's reign took place against a background of financial crisis and increasing military power within the government through both legal and extralegal means. Beginning in 1900, the Imperial Japanese Army and Imperial Japanese Navy held veto power over the formation of cabinets. Between 1921 and 1944, there were 64 separate incidents of political violence.

Hirohito narrowly escaped assassination by a hand grenade thrown by a Korean independence activist, Lee Bong-chang, in Tokyo on 9 January 1932, in the Sakuradamon Incident. Another notable incident was the assassination of moderate Prime Minister Inukai Tsuyoshi in 1932, marking the end of civilian control of the military.

The February 26 incident, an attempted coup d'état, followed in February 1936. It was carried out by junior Army officers of the Kōdōha faction who had the sympathy of many high-ranking officers including Yasuhito, Prince Chichibu, one of Hirohito's brothers. This revolt was occasioned by a loss of political support by the militarist faction in Diet elections. The coup resulted in the murders of several high government and Army officials. When Chief Aide-de-camp Shigeru Honjō informed him of the revolt, Hirohito immediately ordered that it be put down and referred to the officers as "rebels" (bōto). Shortly thereafter, he ordered Army Minister Yoshiyuki Kawashima to suppress the rebellion within the hour. He asked for reports from Honjō every 30 minutes. The next day, when told by Honjō that the high command had made little progress in quashing the rebels, the Emperor told him "I Myself, will lead the Konoe Division and subdue them." When the rebel officers came with their petitions for a new cabinet aligned with their manifesto, he refused to entertain their demands, viewing such concessions as legitimizing treason. The rebellion was later suppressed following his orders on 29 February.

=== Second Sino-Japanese War ===
Beginning with the Mukden Incident in 1931 in which Japan staged a false flag operation and made a false accusation against Chinese dissidents as a pretext to invade Manchuria, Japan occupied Chinese territories and established the puppet government of Manchukuo. Such aggression was recommended to Hirohito by his chiefs of staff and prime minister Fumimaro Konoe; Hirohito did not voice objection to the invasion of China.

A diary by chamberlain Kuraji Ogura says that he was reluctant to start war against China in 1937 because they had underestimated China's military strength and Japan should be cautious in its strategy. In this regard, Ogura writes that Hirohito stated "once you start (a war), it cannot easily be stopped in the middle ... What's important is when to end the war" and "one should be cautious in starting a war, but once begun, it should be carried out thoroughly."

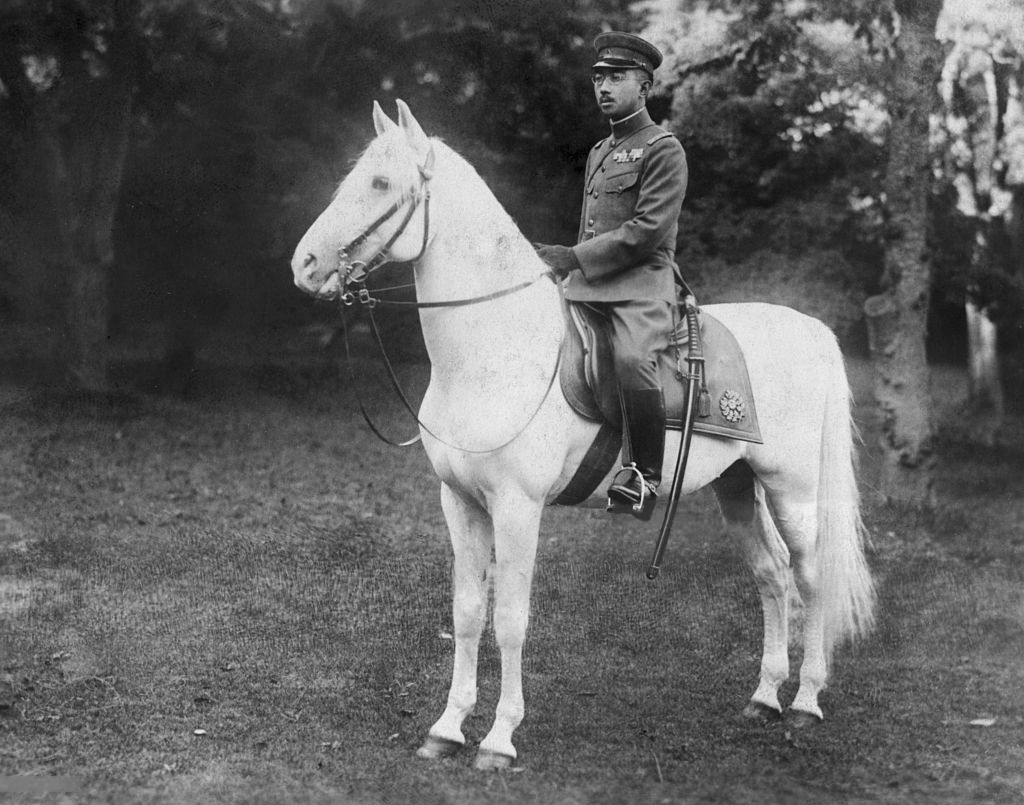
The Emperor on his favorite white horse, Shirayuki (lit. 'white-snow'), in 1935

Nonetheless, according to Herbert Bix, Hirohito's main concern seems to have been the possibility of an attack by the Soviet Union given his questions to his chief of staff, Prince Kan'in Kotohito, and army minister, Hajime Sugiyama, about the time it could take to crush Chinese resistance and how could they prepare for the eventuality of a Soviet incursion. Based on Bix's findings, Hirohito was displeased by Prince Kan'in's evasive responses about the substance of such contingency plans but nevertheless still approved the decision to move troops to North China.

According to Akira Fujiwara, Hirohito endorsed the policy of qualifying the invasion of China as an "incident" instead of a "war"; therefore, he did not issue any notice to observe international law in this conflict (unlike what his predecessors did in previous conflicts officially recognized by Japan as wars), and the Deputy Minister of the Japanese Army instructed the chief of staff of Japanese China Garrison Army on 5 August not to use the term "prisoners of war" for Chinese captives. This instruction led to the removal of the constraints of international law on the treatment of Chinese prisoners. The works of Yoshiaki Yoshimi and Seiya Matsuno show that Hirohito also authorized, by specific orders (rinsanmei), the use of chemical weapons against the Chinese.

Later in his life, Hirohito looked back on his decision to give the go-ahead to wage a 'defensive' war against China and opined that his foremost priority was not to wage war with China but to prepare for a war with the Soviet Union, as his army had reassured him that the war with China would end within three months, but that decision of his had haunted him since he forgotten that the Japanese forces in China were drastically fewer than those of the Chinese, hence his shortsightedness was evident.

On 1 December 1937, Hirohito had given formal instruction to General Iwane Matsui to capture and occupy the enemy capital of Nanking. He was very eager to fight this battle since he and his council firmly believed that all it would take is a one huge blow to bring forth the surrender of Chiang Kai-shek. He even gave an Imperial Rescript to Iwane when he returned to Tokyo a year later, despite the brutality that his officers had inflicted on the Chinese populace in Nanking; thus Hirohito had seemingly turned a blind eye to and condoned these monstrosities.

During the invasion of Wuhan, from August to October 1938, Hirohito authorized the use of chemical weapons on 375 separate occasions, despite the resolution adopted by the League of Nations on 14 May condemning Japanese use of chemical weapons.

=== Pacific War ===
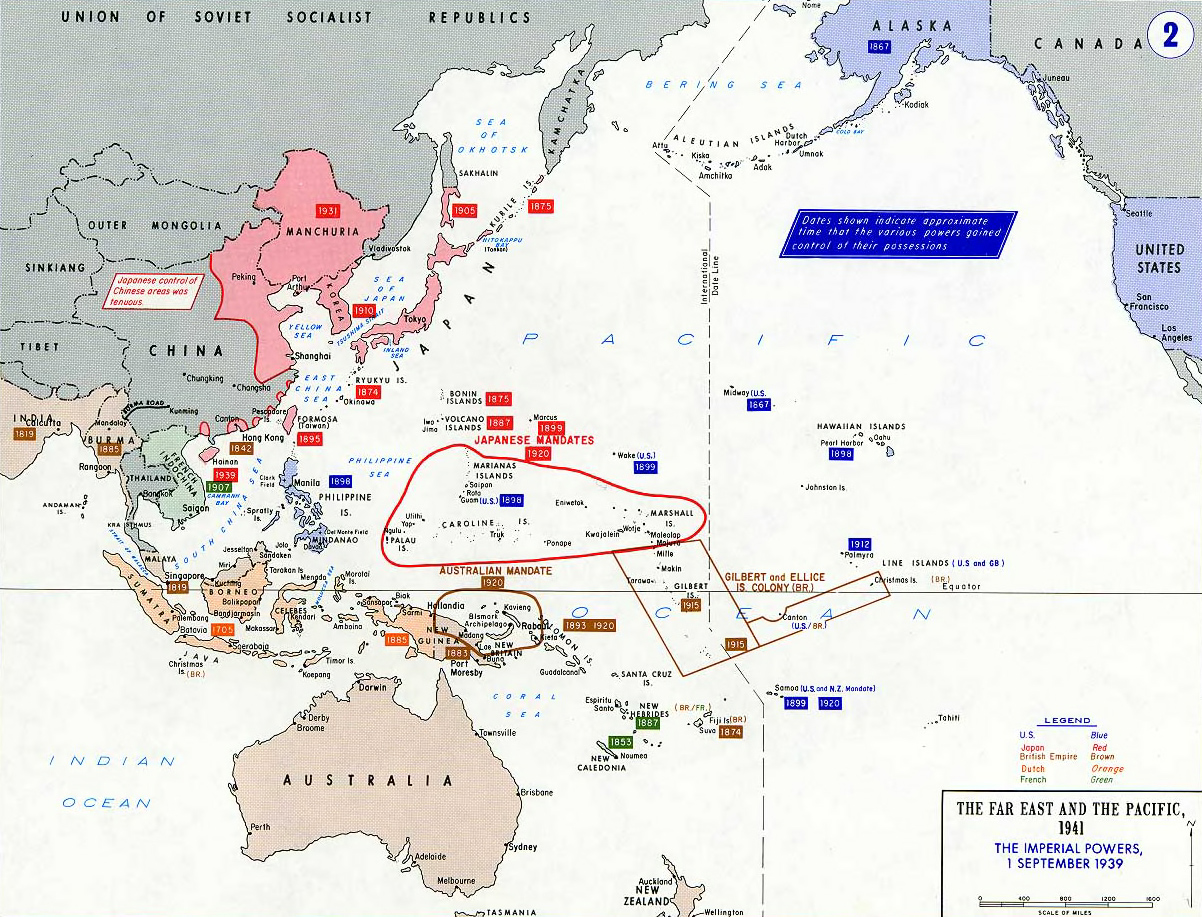
Political-military map of the Asia-Pacific region in 1939

==== Preparations ====
In July 1939, Hirohito quarrelled with his brother, Prince Chichibu, over whether to support the Anti-Comintern Pact, and reprimanded the army minister, Seishirō Itagaki. But after the success of the Wehrmacht in Europe, Hirohito consented to the alliance. On 27 September 1940, ostensibly under Hirohito's leadership, Japan became a contracting partner of the Tripartite Pact with Germany and Italy forming the Axis powers. To avoid a multi-front war, a non-aggression pact between the Soviet Union and Japan was signed in April 1941, two years after the conclusion of the Soviet–Japanese border conflicts.

The objectives to be obtained were clearly defined: a free hand to continue with the conquest of China and Southeast Asia, no increase in U.S. or British military forces in the region, and cooperation by the West "in the acquisition of goods needed by our Empire."

In early 1940, the U.S. began imposing targeted embargoes on Japan—specifically restricting iron, steel, and aviation gasoline—to penalize its invasion of French Indochina and the Japanese war with China. These sanctions, part of an "ABCD Encirclement" aimed to halt Japanese expansion which were tightened into a near-total oil embargo by July 1941.

On 5 September, Prime Minister Konoe informally submitted a draft of the decision to Hirohito, just one day in advance of the Imperial Conference at which it would be formally implemented. On this evening, Hirohito had a meeting with the chief of staff of the army, Sugiyama, chief of staff of the navy, Osami Nagano, and Prime Minister Konoe. Hirohito questioned Sugiyama about the chances of success of an open war with the Occident. As Sugiyama answered positively, Hirohito scolded him:

—At the time of the China Incident, the army told me that we could achieve peace immediately after dealing them one blow with three divisions ... but you can't still beat Chiang Kai-shek even today! Sugiyama, you were army minister at that time.
—China is a vast area with many ways in and ways out, and we met unexpectedly big difficulties ...
—You say the interior of China is huge; isn't the Pacific Ocean even bigger than China? ... Didn't I caution you each time about those matters? Sugiyama, are you lying to me?

Chief of Naval General Staff Admiral Nagano, a former Navy Minister and vastly experienced, later told a trusted colleague, "I have never seen the Emperor reprimand us in such a manner, his face turning red and raising his voice."

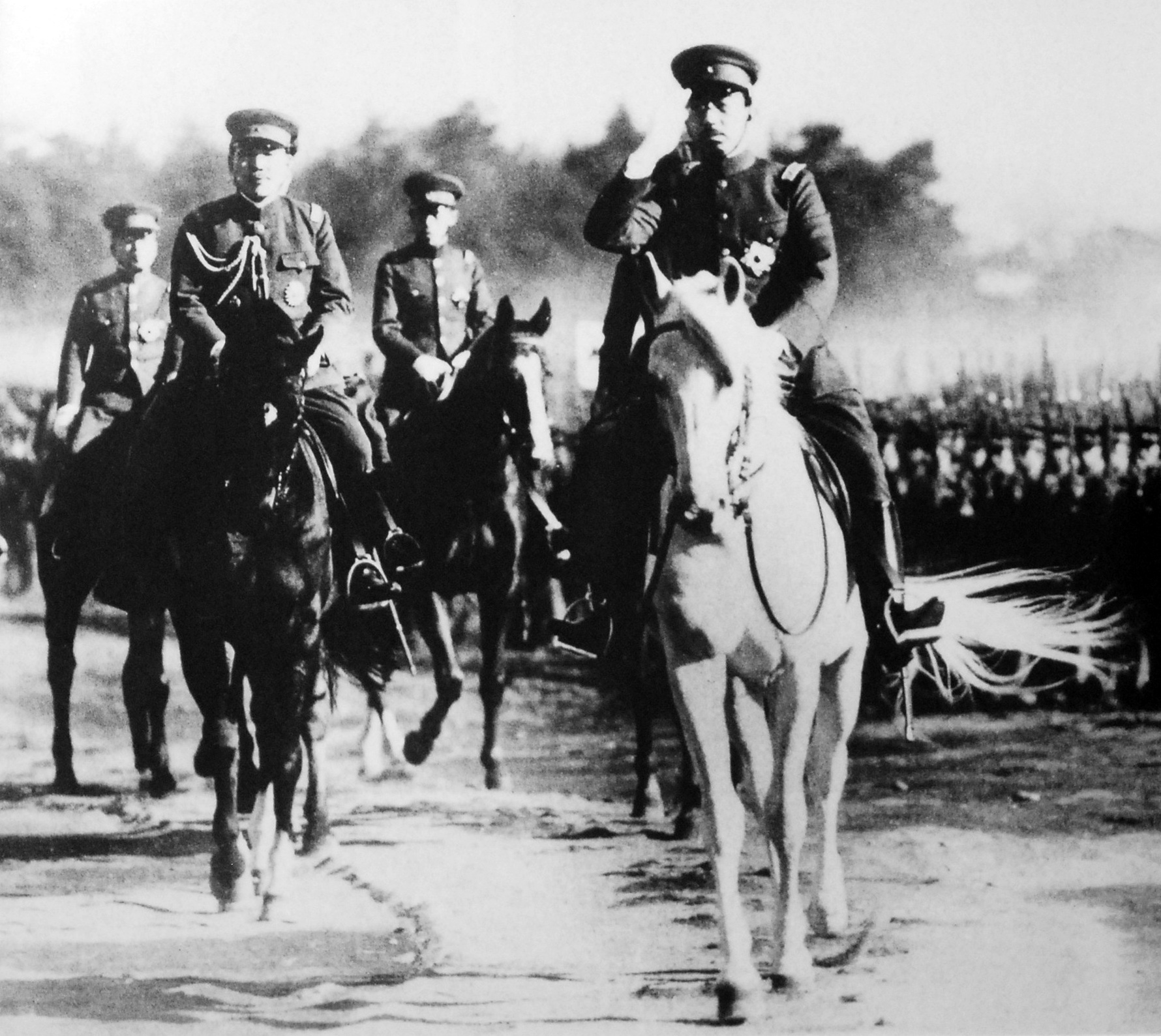
Emperor Hirohito riding Shirayuki during an Army inspection on 8 January 1938

Nevertheless, all speakers at the Imperial Conference were united in favor of war rather than diplomacy. Baron Yoshimichi Hara, President of the Imperial Council and Hirohito's representative, then questioned them closely, producing replies to the effect that war would be considered only as a last resort from some, and silence from others.

On 8 October, Sugiyama signed a 47-page report to the Emperor (sōjōan) outlining in minute detail plans for the advance into Southeast Asia. During the third week of October, Sugiyama gave Hirohito a 51-page document, "Materials in Reply to the Throne," about the operational outlook for the war.

As war preparations continued, Prime Minister Fumimaro Konoe found himself increasingly isolated, and he resigned on 16 October. He justified himself to his chief cabinet secretary, Kenji Tomita, by stating:

Of course His Majesty is a pacifist, and there is no doubt he wished to avoid war. When I told him that to initiate war was a mistake, he agreed. But the next day, he would tell me: "You were worried about it yesterday, but you do not have to worry so much." Thus, gradually, he began to lean toward war. And the next time I met him, he leaned even more toward. In short, I felt the Emperor was telling me: my prime minister does not understand military matters, I know much more. In short, the Emperor had absorbed the view of the army and navy high commands.

The army and the navy recommended the appointment of Prince Naruhiko Higashikuni, one of Hirohito's uncles, as prime minister. According to the Shōwa "Monologue", written after the war, Hirohito then said that if the war were to begin while a member of the imperial house was prime minister, the imperial house would have to carry the responsibility and he was opposed to this. Instead, Hirohito chose the hard-line General Hideki Tōjō, who was known for his devotion to the imperial institution, and asked him to make a policy review of what had been sanctioned by the Imperial Conferences.

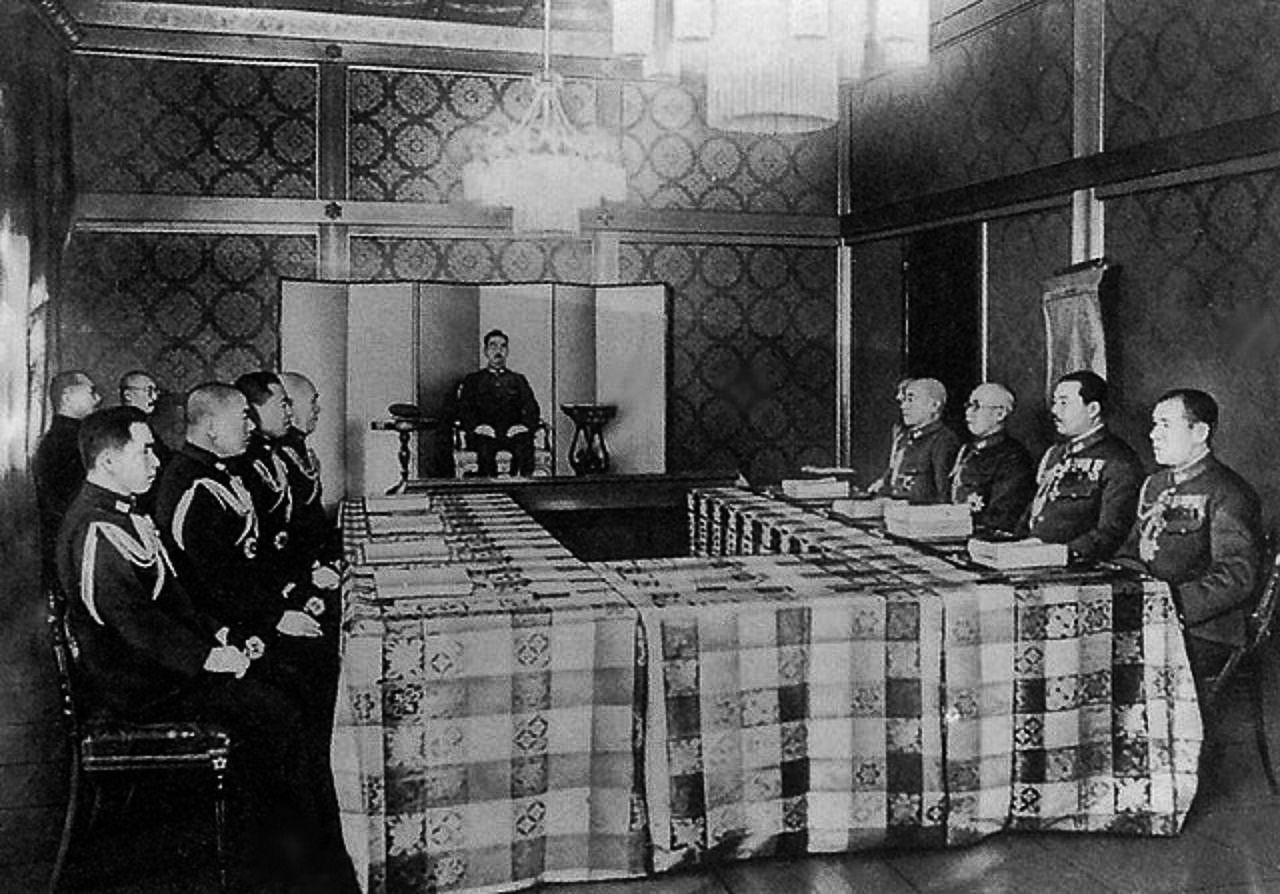
The Emperor as head of the Imperial General Headquarters on 29 April 1943

On 2 November Tōjō, Sugiyama, and Nagano reported to Hirohito that the review of eleven points had been in vain. Emperor Hirohito gave his consent to the war and then asked: "Are you going to provide justification for the war?" The decision for war against the United States was presented for approval to Hirohito by General Tōjō, Naval Minister Admiral Shigetarō Shimada, and Japanese Foreign Minister Shigenori Tōgō.

On 3 November, Nagano explained in detail the plan of the attack on Pearl Harbor to Hirohito. On 5 November Emperor Hirohito approved in imperial conference the operations plan for a war against the Western world and had many meetings with the military and Tōjō until the end of the month. He initially showed hesitance towards engaging in war, but eventually approved the decision to strike Pearl Harbor despite opposition from certain advisors. In the period leading up to Pearl Harbor, he expanded his control over military matters and participated in the Conference of Military Councillors, which was considered unusual of him. Additionally, he sought additional information regarding the attack plans. An aide reported that he openly showed joy upon learning of the success of the surprise attacks.

On 25 November, Henry L. Stimson, the United States Secretary of War, noted in his diary that he had discussed with U.S. President Franklin D. Roosevelt the severe likelihood that Japan was about to launch a surprise attack and that the question had been "how we should maneuver them [the Japanese] into the position of firing the first shot without allowing too much danger to ourselves."

On the following day, 26 November 1941, U.S. Secretary of State Cordell Hull presented the Japanese ambassador with the Hull note, which as one of its conditions demanded the complete withdrawal of all Japanese troops from French Indochina and China. Japanese Prime Minister Hideki Tojo said to his cabinet, "This is an ultimatum." On 1 December, an Imperial Conference sanctioned the "War against the United States, United Kingdom and the Kingdom of the Netherlands."

==== War: advance and retreat ====
On 8 December (7 December in Hawaii), 1941, Japanese forces launched the Pacific War with a series of simultaneous surprise attacks. U.S. territories were targeted during the attack on Pearl Harbor, and the invasion of Batan Island and aerial attack on Clark Field in the Commonwealth of the Philippines. British Empire territories were attacked in the Battle of Hong Kong and the invasion of Malaya.

With the nation fully committed to the war, Hirohito took a keen interest in military progress and sought to boost morale. According to Akira Yamada and Akira Fujiwara, Hirohito made major interventions in some military operations. For example, he pressed Sugiyama four times, on 13 and 21 January and 9 and 26 February, to increase troop strength and launch an attack on Bataan. On 9 February, 19 March, and 29 May, Hirohito ordered the Army Chief of staff to examine the possibilities for an attack on Chongqing in China, which led to Operation Gogo.

While some authors, like journalists Peter Jennings and Todd Brewster, say that throughout the war, Hirohito was "outraged" at Japanese war crimes and the political dysfunction of many societal institutions that proclaimed their loyalty to him, and sometimes spoke up against them, others, such as historians Herbert P. Bix and Mark Felton, as well as the expert on China's international relations Michael Tai, point out that Hirohito personally sanctioned the "Three Alls policy" (Sankō Sakusen), a scorched earth strategy implemented in China from 1942 to 1945 and which was both directly and indirectly responsible for the deaths of "more than 2.7 million" Chinese civilians.

As the tide of war began to turn against Japan (around late 1942 and early 1943), the flow of information to the palace gradually began to bear less and less relation to reality, while others suggest that Hirohito worked closely with Prime Minister Hideki Tojo, continued to be well and accurately briefed by the military, and knew Japan's military position precisely right up to the point of surrender. The chief of staff of the General Affairs section of the Prime Minister's office, Shuichi Inada, remarked to Tōjō's private secretary, Sadao Akamatsu:

There has never been a cabinet in which the prime minister, and all the ministers, reported so often to the throne. In order to effect the essence of genuine direct imperial rule and to relieve the concerns of the Emperor, the ministers reported to the throne matters within the scope of their responsibilities as per the prime minister's directives ... In times of intense activities, typed drafts were presented to the Emperor with corrections in red. First draft, second draft, final draft and so forth, came as deliberations progressed one after the other and were sanctioned accordingly by the Emperor.

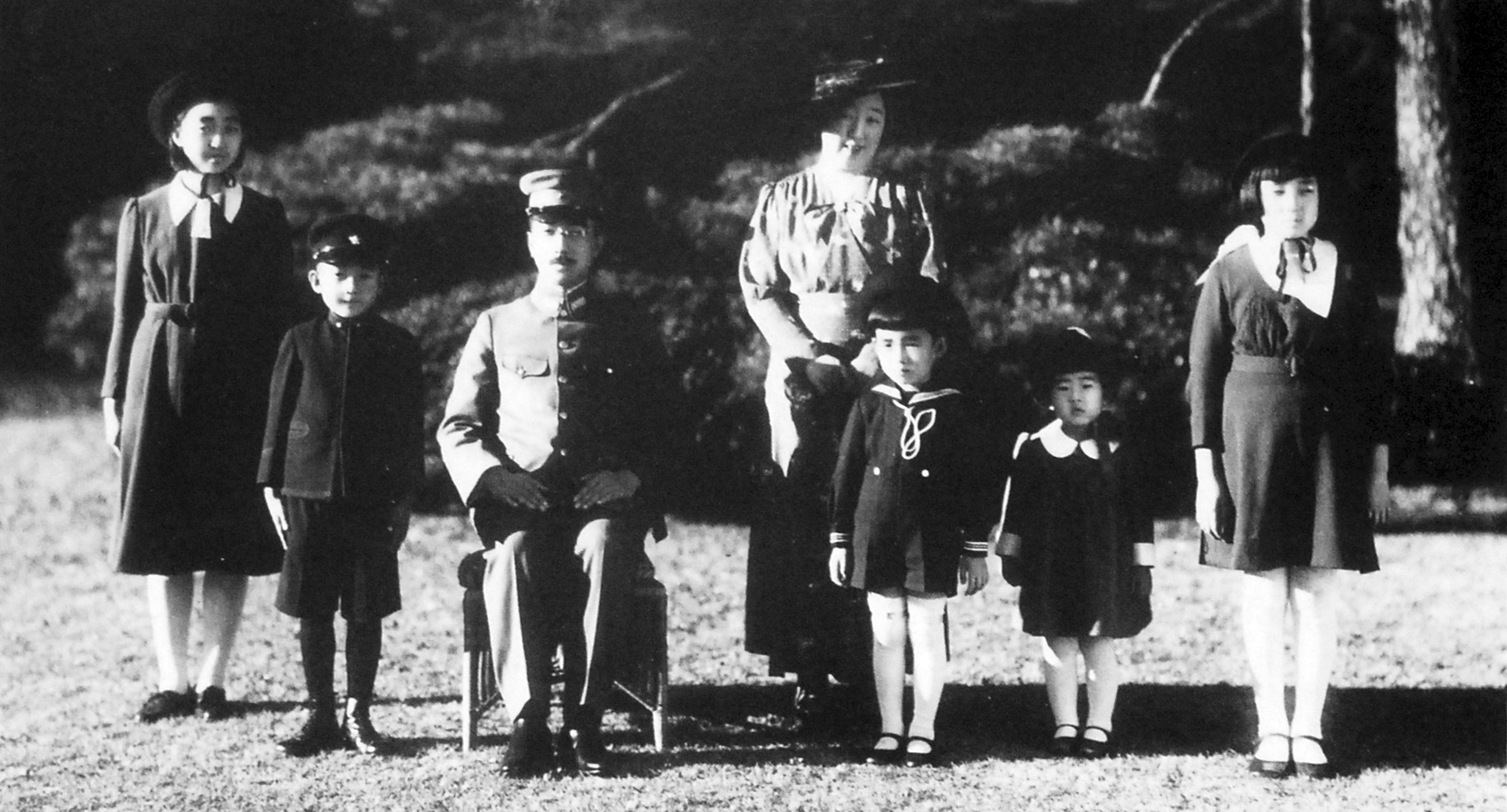
Emperor Hirohito with his wife Empress Kōjun and their children on 7 December 1941

In the first six months of war, all the major engagements had been victories. Japanese advances were stopped in the summer of 1942 with the Battle of Midway and the landing of the American forces on Guadalcanal and Tulagi in August. Hirohito played an increasingly influential role in the war; in eleven major episodes he was deeply involved in supervising the actual conduct of war operations. Hirohito pressured the High Command to order an early attack on the Philippines in 1941–42, including the fortified Bataan peninsula. He secured the deployment of army air power in the Guadalcanal campaign. Following Japan's withdrawal from Guadalcanal he demanded a new offensive in New Guinea, which was duly carried out but failed badly. Unhappy with the navy's conduct of the war, he criticized its withdrawal from the central Solomon Islands and demanded naval battles against the Americans for the losses they had inflicted in the Aleutians. The battles were disasters. Finally, it was at his insistence that plans were drafted for the recapture of Saipan and, later, for an offensive in the Battle of Okinawa. With the Army and Navy bitterly feuding, he settled disputes over the allocation of resources. He helped plan military offenses.

In September 1944, Hirohito declared that it must be his citizens' resolve to smash the evil purposes of the Westerners so that their imperial destiny might continue, but all along, it is just a mask for the urgent need of Japan to scratch a victory against the counter-offensive campaign of the Allied Forces.

On 18 October 1944, Imperial headquarters had resolved that the Japanese must make a stand in the vicinity of Leyte to prevent the Americans from landing in the Philippines. This view was widely frowned upon by the policymakers from both the army and navy sectors. Hirohito was quoted that he approved of such a stand, as if they won in this campaign, they might finally force the Americans to negotiate. Despite the hopeful outlook, a reality check for the Japanese was coming, as the forces that had been sent to attack Leyte, were also the ones designated to defend the island of Luzon, striking a huge blow to the Japanese military strategy.

The media, under tight government control, repeatedly portrayed him as lifting the popular morale even as the Japanese cities came under heavy air attack in 1944–45 and food and housing shortages mounted. Japanese retreats and defeats were celebrated by the media as successes that portended "Certain Victory." Only gradually did it become apparent to the Japanese people that the situation was very grim owing to growing shortages of food, medicine, and fuel as U.S. submarines began wiping out Japanese shipping. Starting in mid 1944, American raids on the major cities of Japan made a mockery of the unending tales of victory. Later that year, with the downfall of Tojo's government, two other prime ministers were appointed to continue the war effort, Kuniaki Koiso and Kantarō Suzuki—each with the formal approval of Hirohito. Both were unsuccessful and Japan was nearing disaster.

==== Surrender ====
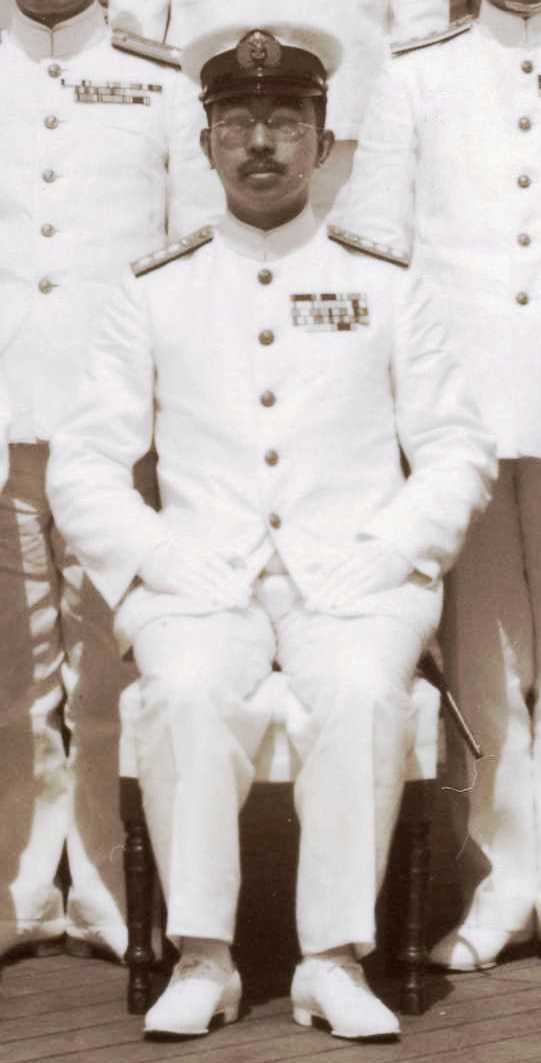
Emperor Hirohito on the battleship Musashi, 24 June 1943

In early 1945, in the wake of the losses in the Battle of Leyte, Emperor Hirohito began a series of individual meetings with senior government officials to consider the progress of the war. All but ex-Prime Minister Fumimaro Konoe advised continuing the war. Konoe feared a communist revolution even more than defeat in war and urged a negotiated surrender. In February 1945, during the first private audience with Hirohito he had been allowed in three years, Konoe advised Hirohito to begin negotiations to end the war. According to Grand Chamberlain Hisanori Fujita, Hirohito, still looking for a tennozan ('a great victory') in order to provide a stronger bargaining position, firmly rejected Konoe's recommendation.

With each passing week victory became less likely. In April, the Soviet Union issued notice that it would not renew its neutrality agreement. Japan's ally Germany surrendered in early May 1945. In June, the cabinet reassessed the war strategy, only to decide more firmly than ever on a fight to the last man. This strategy was officially affirmed at a brief Imperial Council meeting, at which, as was normal, Hirohito did not speak.

The following day, Lord Keeper of the Privy Seal Kōichi Kido prepared a draft document which summarized the hopeless military situation and proposed a negotiated settlement. Extremists in Japan were also calling for a death-before-dishonor mass suicide, modeled on the "47 Ronin" incident. By mid-June 1945, the cabinet had agreed to approach the Soviet Union to act as a mediator for a negotiated surrender but not before Japan's bargaining position had been improved by repulse of the anticipated Allied invasion of mainland Japan.

On 22 June, Hirohito met with his ministers saying, "I desire that concrete plans to end the war, unhampered by existing policy, be speedily studied and that efforts be made to implement them." The attempt to negotiate a peace via the Soviet Union came to nothing. There was always the threat that extremists would carry out a coup or foment other violence. On 26 July 1945, the Allies issued the Potsdam Declaration demanding unconditional surrender. The Japanese government council, the Big Six, considered that option and recommended to Hirohito that it be accepted only if one to four conditions were agreed upon, including a guarantee of Hirohito's continued position in Japanese society.

That changed after the atomic bombings of Hiroshima and Nagasaki and the Soviet declaration of war. On 9 August, Emperor Hirohito told Kōichi Kido: "The Soviet Union has declared war and today began hostilities against us." On 10 August, the cabinet drafted an "Imperial Rescript ending the War" following Hirohito's indications that the declaration did not comprise any demand which prejudiced his prerogatives as a sovereign ruler.

On 12 August 1945, Hirohito informed the imperial family of his decision to surrender. One of his uncles, Prince Yasuhiko Asaka, asked whether the war would be continued if the kokutai ('national polity') could not be preserved. Hirohito simply replied "Of course." On 14 August, Hirohito made the decision to surrender "unconditionally" and the Suzuki government notified the Allies that it had accepted the Potsdam Declaration.

A hardline faction of the army opposed to the surrender attempted a coup d'état on the evening of 14 August, prior to the broadcast. They seized the Imperial Palace (the Kyūjō incident) in an attempt to put Hirohito under house arrest, but the physical pre-taped recording of Hirohito's speech was hidden and preserved overnight while Hirohito himself was in an underground bomb shelter at the Imperial Palace where he remain throughout the night untouched. The coup failed, and the speech was broadcast the next morning.

On 15 August, a recording of Hirohito's surrender speech was broadcast over the radio (the first time Hirohito was heard on the radio by the Japanese people) announcing Japan's acceptance of the Potsdam Declaration. During the historic broadcast Hirohito stated: "Moreover, the enemy has begun to employ a new and most cruel bomb, the power of which to do damage is, indeed, incalculable, taking the toll of many innocent lives. Should we continue to fight, not only would it result in an ultimate collapse and obliteration of the Japanese nation, but also it would lead to the total extinction of human civilization." The speech also noted that "the war situation has developed not necessarily to Japan's advantage" and ordered the Japanese to "endure the unendurable." The speech, using formal, archaic Japanese, was not readily understood by many commoners. According to historian Richard Storry in A History of Modern Japan, Hirohito typically used "a form of language familiar only to the well-educated" and to the more traditional samurai families.

In his first ever press conference given in Tokyo in 1975, when he was asked what he thought of the bombing of Hiroshima, Hirohito answered: "It's very regrettable that nuclear bombs were dropped and I feel sorry for the citizens of Hiroshima but it couldn't be helped because that happened in wartime" (shikata ga nai, meaning 'it cannot be helped'). Hirohito himself visited Hiroshima on December 7, 1947, marking his first visit to the city since the atomic bombing. During this trip, part of his post-war tour, he toured the ruined city, met with residents and encouraged rebuilding efforts, with large crowds gathering to see him. He visited again in 1951 and 1971.

== Postwar reign ==
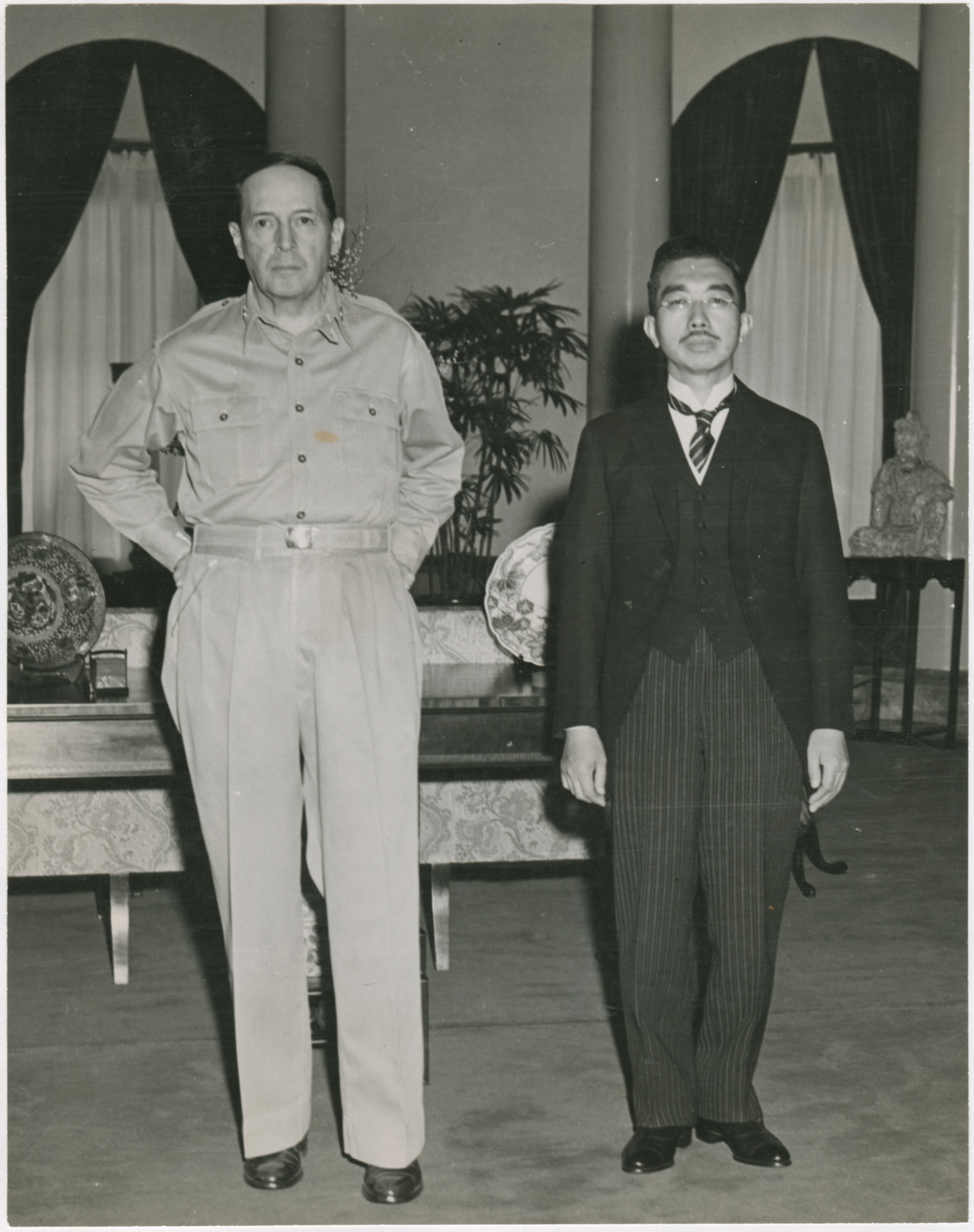
Gaetano Faillace's photograph of General MacArthur and Hirohito at Allied General Headquarters in Tokyo, 27 September 1945

After the Japanese surrender in August 1945, there was a large amount of pressure that came from both Allied countries and Japanese leftists that demanded Hirohito step down and be indicted as a war criminal. Australia, Britain and 70 percent of the American public wanted Hirohito tried as a Class-A war criminal. General Douglas MacArthur did not like the idea, as he thought that an ostensibly cooperating emperor would help establish a peaceful allied occupation regime in Japan. MacArthur saw Hirohito as a symbol of the continuity and cohesion of the Japanese people. To avoid the possibility of civil unrest in Japan, any possible evidence that would incriminate Hirohito and his family were excluded from the International Military Tribunal for the Far East. MacArthur created a plan that separated Hirohito from the militarists, retained Hirohito as a constitutional monarch but only as a figurehead, and used Hirohito to retain control over Japan to help achieve American postwar objectives in Japan.

As Hirohito appointed his uncle and daughter's father-in-law, Prince Naruhiko Higashikuni as the Prime Minister to replace Kantarō Suzuki, who resigned owing to responsibility for the surrender, to assist the American occupation, there were attempts by numerous leaders to have him put on trial for alleged war crimes. Many members of the imperial family, such as Princes Chichibu, Takamatsu, and Higashikuni, pressured Hirohito to abdicate so that one of the princes could serve as regent until his eldest son, Crown Prince Akihito came of age. On 27 February 1946, Hirohito's youngest brother, Prince Mikasa, even stood up in the privy council and indirectly urged Hirohito to step down and accept responsibility for Japan's defeat. According to Minister of Welfare Ashida's diary, "Everyone seemed to ponder Mikasa's words. Never have I seen His Majesty's face so pale."

Before the war crime trials actually convened, the Supreme Commander for the Allied Powers, its International Prosecution Section (IPS) and Japanese officials worked behind the scenes not only to prevent the Imperial family from being indicted, but also to influence the testimony of the defendants to ensure that no one implicated Hirohito. High officials in court circles and the Japanese government collaborated with Allied General Headquarters in compiling lists of prospective war criminals, while the individuals arrested as Class A suspects and incarcerated solemnly vowed to protect their sovereign against any possible taint of war responsibility. Thus, "months before the Tokyo tribunal commenced, MacArthur's highest subordinates were working to attribute ultimate responsibility for Pearl Harbor to Hideki Tōjō" by allowing "the major criminal suspects to coordinate their stories so that Hirohito would be spared from indictment." According to John W. Dower,

This successful campaign to absolve Hirohito of war responsibility knew no bounds. Hirohito was not merely presented as being innocent of any formal acts that might make him culpable to indictment as a war criminal, he was turned into an almost saintly figure who did not even bear moral responsibility for the war.

According to Bix, "MacArthur's truly extraordinary measures to save Hirohito from trial as a war criminal had a lasting and profoundly distorting impact on Japanese understanding of the lost war."

Historian Gary J. Bass presented evidence supporting Hirohito's responsibility in the war, noting that had he been prosecuted as some judges and others advocated, a compelling case could have been constructed against him. However, the Americans were apprehensive that removing the emperor from power and subjecting him to trial could trigger widespread chaos and collapse of Japan, given his revered status among the Japanese populace. Additionally, the advent of the Cold War brought about harsh political circumstances. Chiang Kai-shek's Chinese nationalists were losing the Chinese Civil War to Mao Zedong's Chinese Communist Party, prompting the Truman administration to consider the potential loss of China as an ally and strategic partner. As a result, ensuring Japan's strength and stability became imperative for securing a reliable postwar ally.

=== Imperial status ===
Hirohito was not put on trial, but he was forced to explicitly reject the quasi-official claim that the emperor was arahitogami, 'an incarnate divinity'. This was motivated by the fact that, according to the Japanese constitution of 1889, the emperor had a divine power over his country. In turn, this provision was derived from the Shinto belief that the Japanese Imperial Family were the descendants of the sun goddess Amaterasu. Hirohito was however persistent in the idea that the Emperor of Japan should be considered a descendant of the gods. In December 1945, he told his vice-grand-chamberlain Michio Kinoshita: "It is permissible to say that the idea that the Japanese are descendants of the gods is a false conception; but it is absolutely impermissible to call chimerical the idea that the Emperor is a descendant of the gods." In any case, the "renunciation of divinity" was noted more by foreigners than by Japanese, and seems to have been intended for the consumption of the former. (Note: Many foreigners, including those from the occupying power, were from Western countries steeped in monotheistic Abrahamic traditions.) The theory of a constitutional monarchy had already had some proponents in Japan. In 1935, when Tatsukichi Minobe advocated the theory that sovereignty resides in the state, of which the Emperor is just an organ (the tennō kikan setsu), it caused a furor. He was forced to resign from the House of Peers and his post at the Tokyo Imperial University, his books were banned, and an attempt was made on his life. Not until 1946 was the tremendous step made to alter the Emperor's title from "imperial sovereign" to "constitutional monarch."

Although the Emperor had supposedly repudiated claims to divinity, his public position was deliberately left vague, partly because General MacArthur thought him probable to be a useful partner to get the Japanese to accept the occupation and partly owing to behind-the-scenes maneuvering by Shigeru Yoshida to thwart attempts to cast him as a European-style monarch.

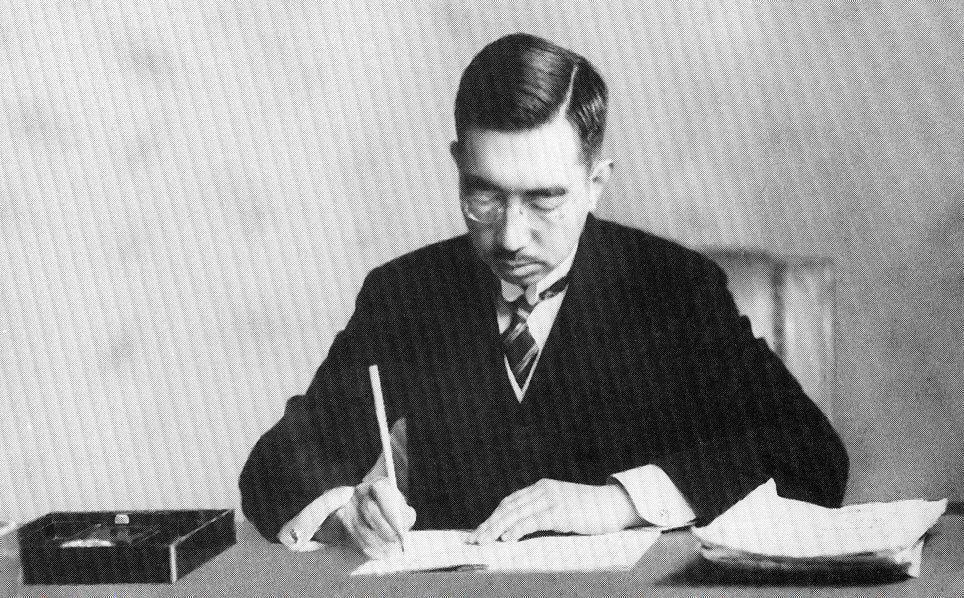
Hirohito signing Japan's 1947 constitution

Nevertheless, Hirohito's status as a limited constitutional monarch was formalized with the enactment of the 1947 constitution–officially, an amendment to the Meiji Constitution, but in truth an entirely new document written by the United States. It defined the Emperor as "the symbol of the state and the unity of the people." His role was redefined as entirely ceremonial and representative, without even nominal governmental powers. He was limited to performing matters of state as delineated in the Constitution, and in most cases his actions in that realm were carried out in accordance with the binding instructions of the Cabinet.

On 17 October 1960, following the assassination of Inejirō Asanuma—chairman of the Japan Socialist Party—by 17-year-old ultranationalist Otoya Yamaguchi, Hirohito sent an imperial envoy to Asanuma's home with sacrificial offerings (saishiryō). One day later, on 18 October, he addressed a special session of the National Diet, urging the Japanese people to "esteem the principle of obeying the laws" and to "shun violence." The remarks were widely understood as a response to the killing and fears of further political unrest. Contemporary observers described the speech as one of the emperor's most direct public interventions in a domestic political matter since the end of World War II.

Following the Iranian Revolution and the end of the short-lived Central African Empire, both in 1979, Hirohito found himself the last monarch in the world to bear any variation of the highest royal title "emperor."

=== Public figure ===
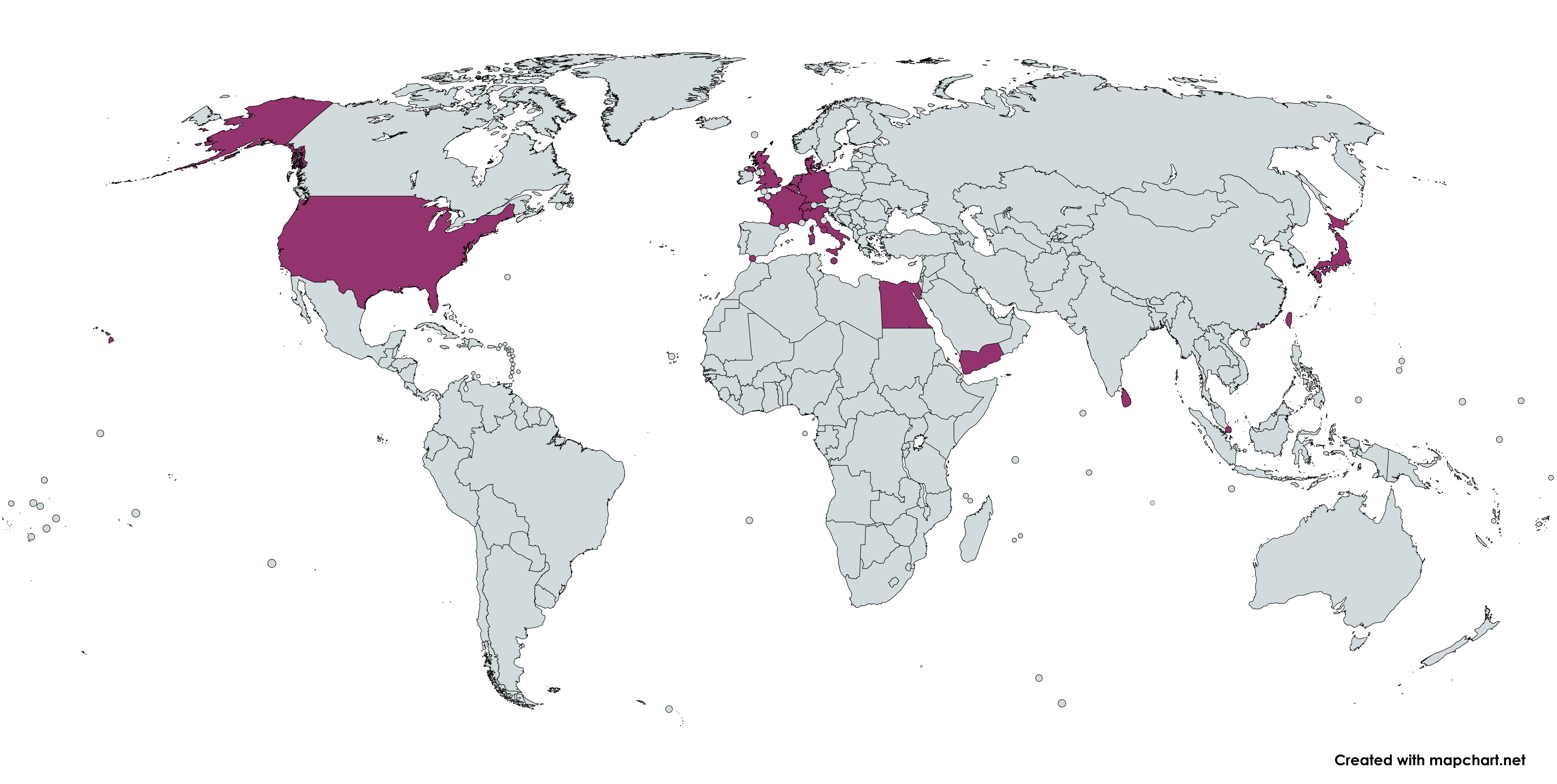
Map of Countries visited by Emperor Hirohito (Shōwa) on an official overseas visit (includes countries he stopped over during 1921 European tour and excludes Southern Sakhalin under Japanese rule, he visited in 1925.)

He was not only the first reigning Japanese emperor to visit foreign countries, (Note: In October 1907, His father, then-Crown Prince Yoshihito (later Emperor Taishō) visited the Korean Empire before it came under Japanese rule.) but also the first to meet an American president. His status and image became strongly positive in the United States.

==== Visit to Europe ====
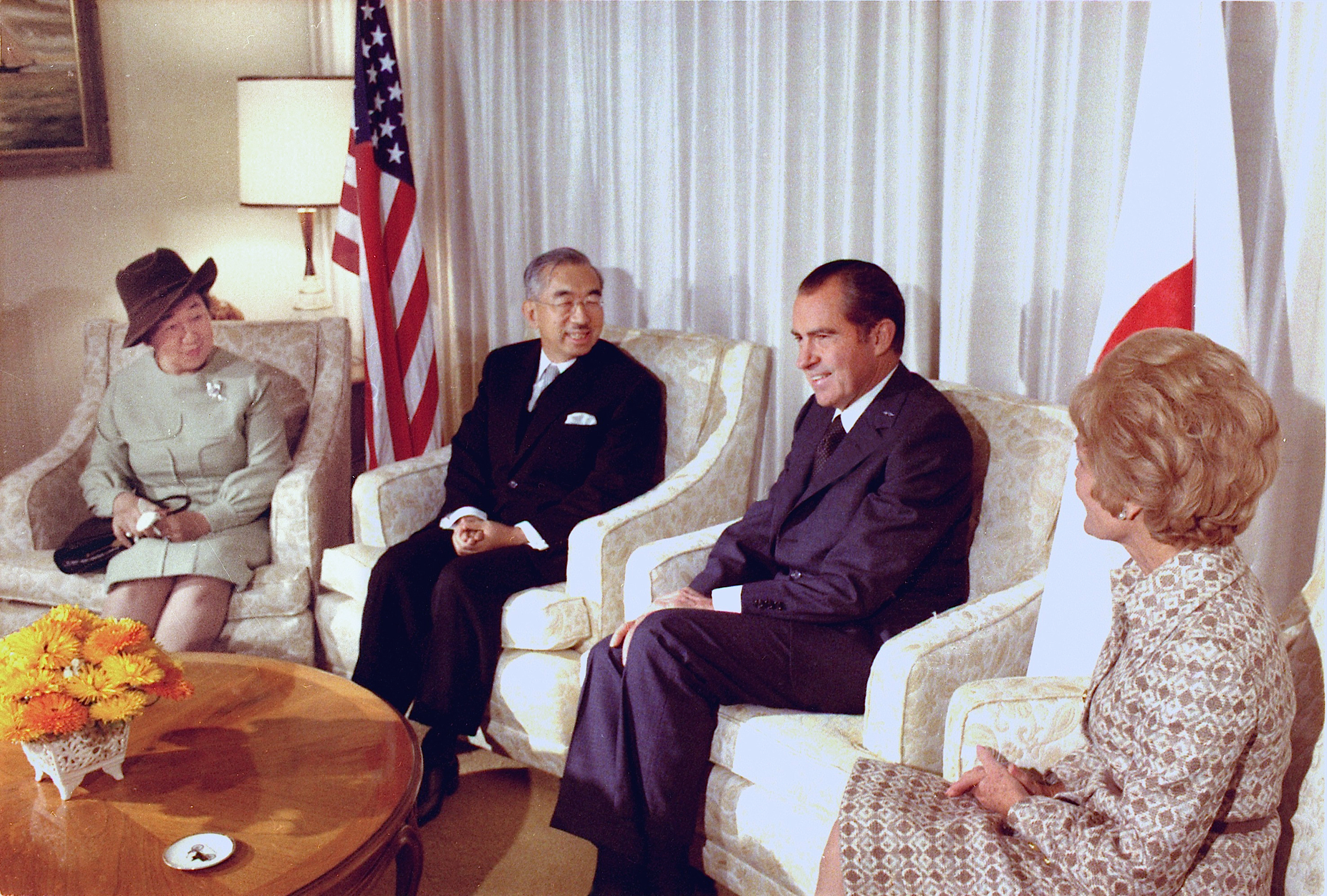
Emperor Hirohito and Empress Nagako with U.S. President Richard Nixon and First Lady Pat Nixon in Anchorage, 27 September 1971

The talks between Emperor Hirohito and President Nixon were not planned at the outset, because initially the stop in the United States was only for refueling to visit Europe. However, the meeting was decided in a hurry at the request of the United States. Although the Japanese side accepted the request, Minister for Foreign Affairs Takeo Fukuda made a public telephone call to the Japanese ambassador to the United States Nobuhiko Ushiba, who promoted talks, saying, "that will cause me a great deal of trouble. We want to correct the perceptions of the other party." At that time, Foreign Minister Fukuda was worried that President Nixon's talks with Hirohito would be used to repair the deteriorating Japan–U.S. relations, and he was concerned that the premise of the symbolic emperor system could fluctuate.

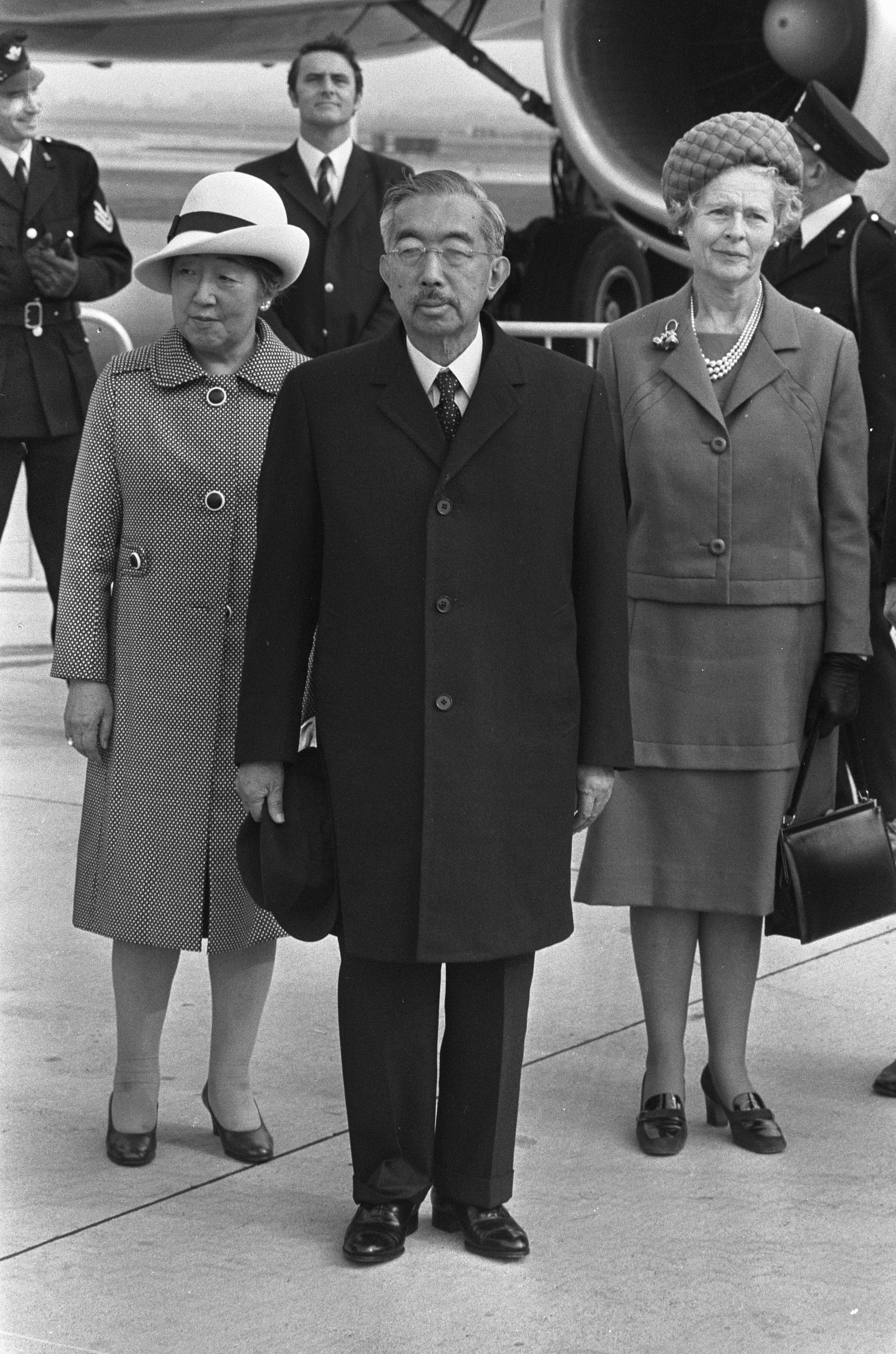
Emperor Hirohito and Empress Nagako arriving in the Netherlands, 8 October 1971

There was an early visit with deep royal exchanges in Denmark and Belgium. In France, Hirohito was warmly welcomed, and reunited with Edward VIII, who had abdicated in 1936 and was virtually in exile, and they chatted for a while. However, protests were held in Britain and the Netherlands by veterans who had served in the South-East Asian theatre of World War II and civilian victims of the brutal occupation there. In the Netherlands, raw eggs and vacuum flasks were thrown. The protest was so severe that Empress Nagako, who accompanied the Emperor, was exhausted. In the United Kingdom, protestors stood in silence and turned their backs when Hirohito's carriage passed them while others wore red gloves to symbolize the dead. The satirical magazine Private Eye used a racist double entendre to refer to Hirohito's visit ("nasty Nip in the air"). In West Germany, the Japanese monarch's visit was met with hostile far-left protests, participants of which viewed Hirohito as the East Asian equivalent of Adolf Hitler and referred to him as "Hirohitler", and prompted a wider comparative discussion of the memory and perception of Axis war crimes. The protests against Hirohito's visit also condemned and highlighted what they perceived as mutual Japanese and West German complicity in and enabling of the American war effort against communism in Vietnam.

Regarding these protests and opposition, Emperor Hirohito was not surprised to have received a report in advance at a press conference on 12 November after returning to Japan and said that "I do not think that welcome can be ignored" from each country. Also, at a press conference following their golden wedding anniversary three years later, along with the Empress, he mentioned this visit to Europe as his most enjoyable memory in 50 years.

==== Visit to the United States ====
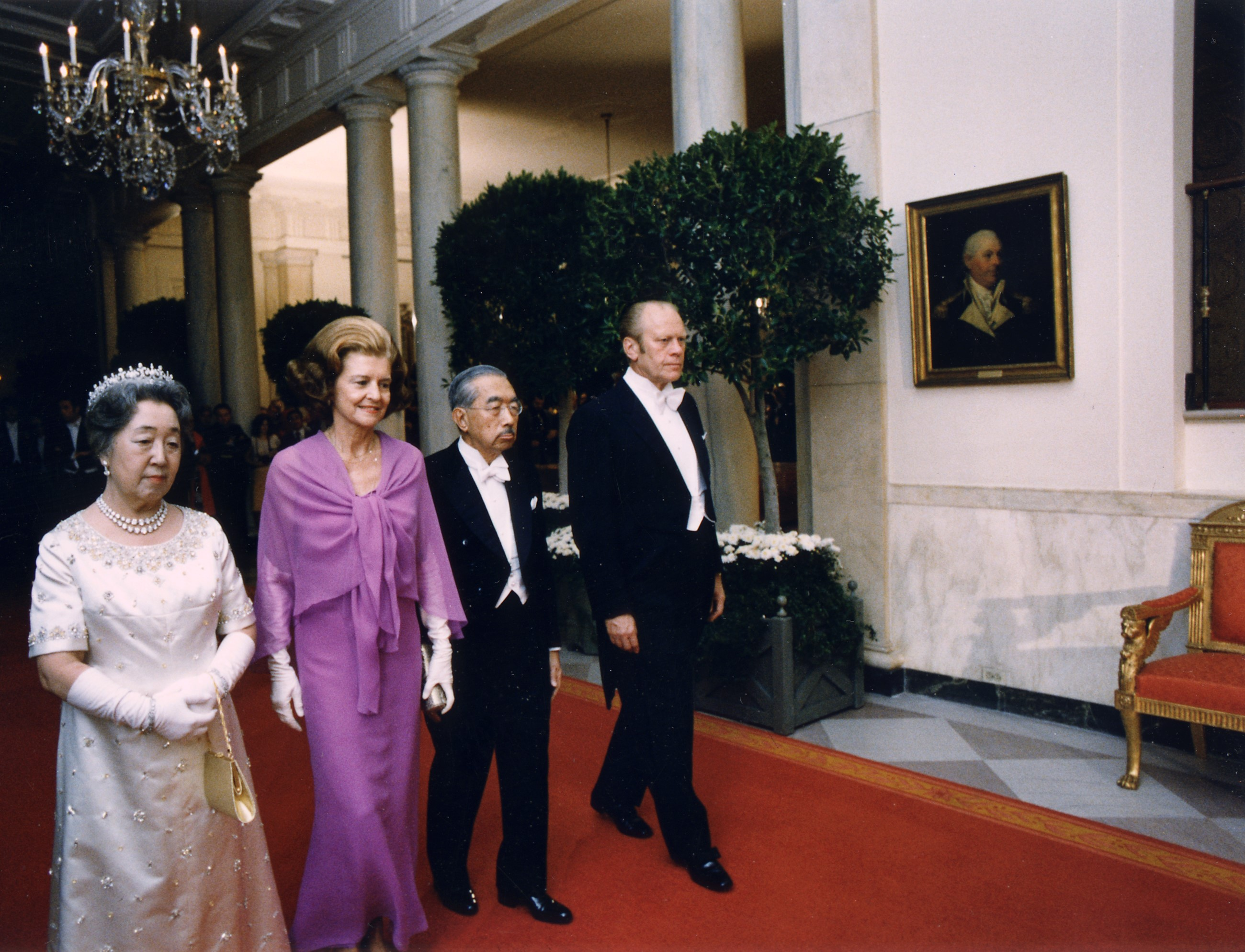
Empress Nagako, First Lady Betty Ford, Emperor Hirohito, and President Gerald Ford at the White House before a state dinner held in honor of the Japanese head of state for the first time, 2 October 1975

In 1975, Hirohito and Nagako visited the United States for 14 days from 30 September to 14 October, at the invitation of President Gerald Ford. The visit was the first such event in US–Japanese history. (Note: The reason a visit had not occurred prior to this was, in part, because the Act for Extraordinary Vicarious Execution of State Affairs had not yet been put into law. Despite this, visits to the United States had been planned in 1973 and 1974, but never occurred owing to lack of coordination.) The United States Army, Navy and Air Force, as well as the Marine Corps and the Coast Guard honored the state visit. Before and after the visit, a series of terrorist attacks in Japan were caused by anti-American left-wing organizations such as the East Asia Anti-Japan Armed Front.

After arriving in Williamsburg on 30 September 1975, Emperor Hirohito and Empress Nagako stayed in the United States for two weeks. The official meeting with President Ford occurred on 2 October. On 3 October, Hirohito visited Arlington National Cemetery. On 6 October, Emperor Hirohito and Empress Nagako visited Vice President and Mrs. Rockefeller at their home in Westchester County, New York.

In a speech at the White House state dinner, Hirohito read, "Thanks to the United States for helping to rebuild Japan after the war." During his stay in Los Angeles, he visited Disneyland, and a smiling photo next to Mickey Mouse adorned the newspapers, and there was talk about the purchase of a Mickey Mouse watch. Two types of commemorative stamps and stamp sheets were issued on the day of their return to Japan which demonstrated that the visit had been a significant undertaking.

==== Marine biology ====
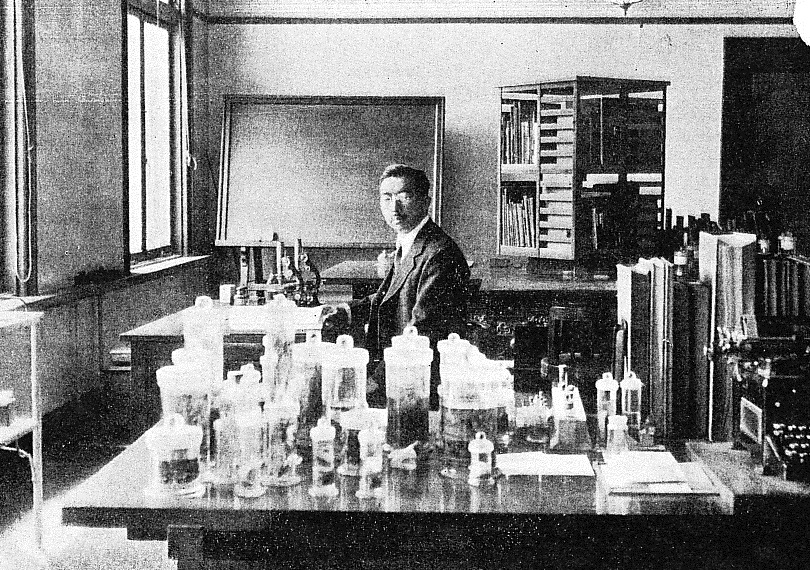
Emperor Hirohito in his laboratory, 1950

Hirohito was deeply interested in and well-informed about marine biology, and the Tokyo Imperial Palace contained a laboratory from which Hirohito published several papers in the field under his personal name "Hirohito". His contributions included the description of several dozen species of Hydrozoa new to science.

=== Yasukuni Shrine ===
Hirohito maintained an official boycott of the Yasukuni Shrine after it was revealed to him that Class-A war criminals had secretly been enshrined after its post-war rededication. This boycott lasted from 1978 until his death and has been continued by his successors, Akihito and Naruhito.

On 20 July 2006, Nihon Keizai Shimbun published a front-page article about the discovery of a memorandum detailing the reason that Hirohito stopped visiting Yasukuni. The memorandum, kept by former chief of Imperial Household Agency Tomohiko Tomita, confirms for the first time that the enshrinement of 14 Class-A war criminals in Yasukuni was the reason for the boycott. Tomita recorded in detail the contents of his conversations with Hirohito in his diaries and notebooks. According to the memorandum, in 1988, Hirohito expressed his strong displeasure at the decision made by Yasukuni Shrine to include Class-A war criminals in the list of war dead honored there by saying, "At some point, Class-A criminals became enshrined, including Matsuoka and Shiratori. I heard Tsukuba acted cautiously." Tsukuba is believed to refer to Fujimaro Tsukuba, the former chief Yasukuni priest at the time, who decided not to enshrine the war criminals despite having received in 1966 the list of war dead compiled by the government. "What's on the mind of Matsudaira's son, who is the current head priest?" "Matsudaira had a strong wish for peace, but the child didn't know the parent's heart. That's why I have not visited the shrine since. This is my heart." Matsudaira is believed to refer to Yoshitami Matsudaira, who was the grand steward of the Imperial Household immediately after the end of World War II. His son, Nagayoshi, succeeded Fujimaro Tsukuba as the chief priest of Yasukuni and decided to enshrine the war criminals in 1978.

== Death and state funeral ==
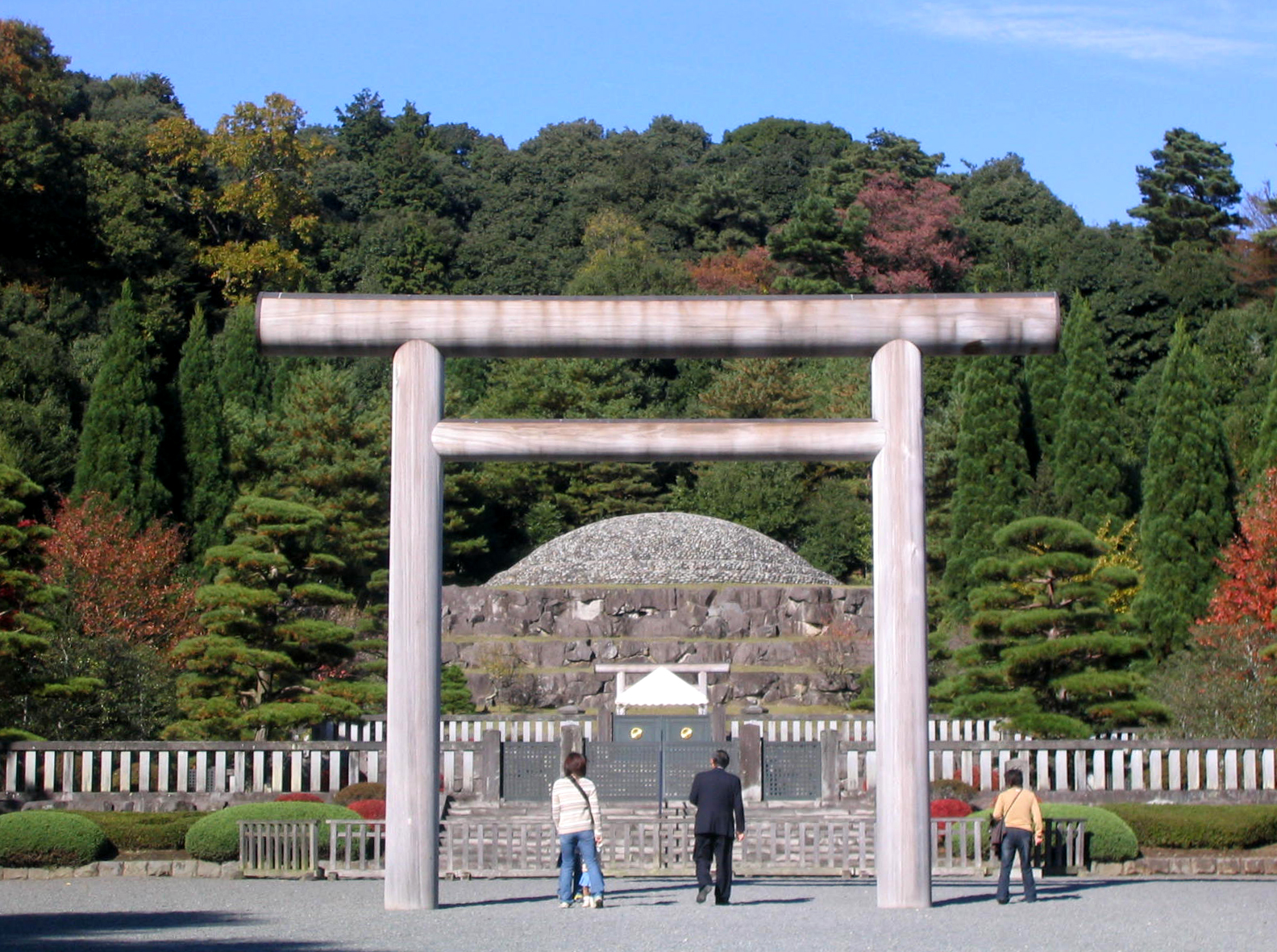
Emperor Shōwa's tomb in the Musashi Imperial Graveyard, Hachiōji, Tokyo

On 22 September 1987, Hirohito underwent surgery on his pancreas after having digestive problems for several months. The doctors discovered that he had duodenal cancer. Hirohito appeared to be making a full recovery for several months after the surgery. About a year later, however, on 19 September 1988, he collapsed in his palace, and his health worsened over the next several months as he suffered from continuous internal bleeding.

The Emperor died at 6:33 am on 7 January 1989 at the age of 87. The announcement from the grand steward of Japan's Imperial Household Agency, Shoichi Fujimori, revealed details about his cancer for the first time. Hirohito was survived by his wife, his five surviving children, ten grandchildren, and one great-grandchild.

At the time of his death, he was both the oldest and longest-reigning historical Japanese emperor, as well as the longest-reigning living monarch in the world at that time, a distinction which passed to the Prince of Liechtenstein, Franz Joseph II, until his own death in November of the same year.

The Emperor was succeeded by his eldest son, Akihito (r. 1989–2019), whose enthronement ceremony was held on 12 November 1990 at the Tokyo Imperial Palace.

On 24 February, Hirohito's state funeral was held at the Shinjuku Gyo-en, and unlike that of his predecessor, it was formal but not conducted in a strictly Shinto manner. A large number of world leaders attended the funeral. Hirohito was buried in the Musashi Imperial Graveyard in Hachiōji, Tokyo alongside his late parents. Following his wife's death in 2000, she was buried near him.

== Accountability for Japanese war crimes ==
The issue of Emperor Hirohito's war responsibility remains contested. During the war, the Allies frequently depicted Hirohito to equate with Adolf Hitler and Benito Mussolini as the three Axis dictators. According to Bix, U.S. authorities thought that the retention of the emperor would help establish a peaceful allied occupation regime in Japan and they therefore depicted Hirohito as a "powerless figurehead" without any implication in wartime policies. Starting with the publication of specific archival records in the 1960s and continuing after Hirohito's death in 1989, a growing body of evidence and historical studies started to dispute the theory that he was a powerless figurehead. In recent years, the debate over the Emperor's role in the war has focused on the exact extent of his involvement in political and military affairs (as it is now widely accepted that he had at least some degree of involvement).

Historian Peter Wetzler said that:

"The debate, however, about Hirohito's participation in political and military affairs during the Second World War -whether or not (at first) and to what extent (later)- still continues. It will animate authors for years to come. Now most historians acknowledge that the Emperor was deeply involved, like all nation-state leaders at that time."

Jennifer Lind, associate professor of government at Dartmouth College and a specialist in Japanese war memory, states that:

"Over the years, these different pieces of evidence have trickled out and historians have amassed this picture of culpability and how he was reflecting on that. This is another piece of the puzzle that very much confirms that the picture that was taking place before, which is that he was extremely culpable, and after the war he was devastated about this."

As new evidence surfaced over the years, historians concluded that he bore at least some amount of culpability for the war's outbreak and the crimes perpetrated by Japan's military during that period.

=== Evidence for wartime culpability ===
==== Historians' assessments ====
Historians who point to a higher degree of the Emperor's involvement in the war have stated that Hirohito was directly responsible for the atrocities committed by the imperial forces in the Second Sino-Japanese War and in World War II. They have said that he and some members of the imperial family, such as his brother Prince Chichibu, his cousins the princes Takeda and Fushimi, and his uncles the princes Kan'in, Asaka, and Higashikuni, should have been tried for war crimes. In a study published in 1996, historian Mitsuyoshi Himeta said that the Three Alls policy (Sankō Sakusen), a Japanese scorched earth policy adopted in China and sanctioned by Emperor Hirohito himself, was both directly and indirectly responsible for the deaths of "more than 2.7 million" Chinese civilians. In Hirohito and the Making of Modern Japan, Herbert P. Bix said the Sankō Sakusen far surpassed Nanking Massacre not only in terms of numbers, but in brutality. According to Bix, "[t]hese military operations caused death and suffering on a scale incomparably greater than the totally unplanned orgy of killing in Nanking, which later came to symbolize the war". While the Nanking Massacre was unplanned, Bix said "Hirohito knew of and approved annihilation campaigns in China that included burning villages thought to harbor guerrillas." Likewise, in August 2000, the Los Angeles Times reported that top U.S. government officials were fully aware of the emperor's intimate role during the war.

According to Yuki Tanaka, Emeritus Research Professor of History at Hiroshima City University, the war records at the Defense Agency National Institute provide evidence that Hirohito was heavily involved in creating war policies. He further stated that Japanese statesmen Kido Kōichi's wartime journal undeniably proves that Hirohito had a crucial role in the final decision to wage a war against the Allied nations in December 1941.

According to Francis Pike, Hirohito was deeply engaged in military operations and commissioned a war room beneath the Tokyo Imperial Palace to closely monitor Japan's military activities. Pike further noted that the extensive resources required for regular updates to the Emperor often drew complaints from military officials. To celebrate significant military victories, he rode his white horse in parades in front of the Imperial Palace.

According to Peter Wetzler, he was actively involved in the decision to launch the war as well as in other political and military decisions.

Poison gas weapons, such as phosgene, were produced by Unit 731 and authorized by specific orders given by Hirohito himself, transmitted by the chief of staff of the army. Hirohito authorized the use of chemical weapons 375 times during the Battle of Wuhan from August to October 1938. He rewarded Shirō Ishii, who was the head of the medical experimentation unit and Unit 731, with a special service medal.

Prince Mikasa, the younger brother of Hirohito, informed the Yomiuri Shimbun that during 1944, he compiled a thorough report detailing the wartime atrocities perpetrated by Japanese soldiers in China. He clarified that he didn't directly discuss the report with Hirohito; however, he added that "when I met with him, I did report on the China situation in bits and pieces." Additionally, he recalled showing Hirohito a Chinese-produced film depicting Japanese atrocities.

Officially, the imperial constitution, adopted under Emperor Meiji, gave full power to the Emperor. Article 4 prescribed that, "The Emperor is the head of the Empire, combining in Himself the rights of sovereignty, and exercises them, according to the provisions of the present Constitution." Likewise, according to article 6, "The Emperor gives sanction to laws and orders them to be promulgated and executed," and article 11, "The Emperor has the supreme command of the Army and the Navy." The Emperor was thus the leader of the Imperial General Headquarters.

According to Bob Tadashi Wakabayashi of York University, Hirohito's authority up to 1945 depended on three elements:

First, he was a constitutional monarch subject to legal restrictions and binding conventions, as he has so often stressed. Second, he was supreme commander of Japanese armed forces, though his orders were often ignored and sometimes defied. Third, he wielded absolute moral authority in Japan by granting imperial honors that conveyed incontestable prestige and by issuing imperial rescripts that had coercive power greater than law. [¶] In the postwar era, the Japanese Government, some Japanese historians, and Hirohito himself have downplayed or ignored these second and third elements, which were strongest up to 1945; and they have overemphasized the first, which was weakest. Hirohito was no despot. But he did retain 'absolute' power in the sense of ultimate and final authority to sanction a particular policy decision by agreeing with it, or to force its reformulation or abandonment by disagreeing with it. When he really wanted to put his foot down, he did –– even to the army."

Wakabayashi further adds:

...as a matter of course, [Hirohito] wanted to keep what his generals conquered -- though he was less greedy than some of them. None of this should surprise us. Hirohito would no more have granted Korea independence or returned Manchuria to China than Roosevelt would have granted Hawaii independence or returned Texas to Mexico.

Historians such as Herbert Bix, Akira Fujiwara, Peter Wetzler, and Akira Yamada assert that post-war arguments favoring the view that Hirohito was a mere figurehead overlook the importance of numerous "behind the chrysanthemum curtain" meetings where the real decisions were made between the Emperor, his chiefs of staff, and the cabinet. Using primary sources and the monumental work of Shirō Hara as a basis, (Note: Former member of section 20 of War operations of the Army high command, Hara has made a detailed study of the way military decisions were made, including the Emperor's involvement published in five volumes in 1973–74 under the title Daihon'ei senshi; Daitōa Sensō kaisen gaishi; Kaisen ni itaru seisentyaku shidō (Imperial Headquarters war history; General history of beginning hostilities in the Greater East Asia War; Leadership and political strategy with respect to the beginning of hostilities).) Fujiwara and Wetzler have produced evidence suggesting that the Emperor actively participated in making political and military decisions and was neither bellicose nor a pacifist but an opportunist who governed in a pluralistic decision-making process. Historian Peter Wetzler states that the emperor was thoroughly informed of military matters, and comensurate with his position and Japanese methods of forming policies, he participated in making political and military decisions as the constitutional emperor of Imperial Japan and head of the imperial house. For his part, American historian Herbert P. Bix maintains that Emperor Hirohito worked through intermediaries to exercise a great deal of control over the military and might have been the prime mover behind most of Japan's military aggression during the Shōwa era.

The view promoted by the Imperial Palace and American occupation forces immediately after World War II portrayed Emperor Hirohito as a purely ceremonial figure who behaved strictly according to protocol while remaining at a distance from the decision-making processes. This view was endorsed by Prime Minister Noboru Takeshita in a speech on the day of Hirohito's death in which Takeshita asserted that the war "had broken out against [Hirohito's] wishes." Takeshita's statement provoked outrage in nations in East Asia and Commonwealth nations such as the United Kingdom, Canada, Australia, and New Zealand. According to historian Fujiwara, "The thesis that the Emperor, as an organ of responsibility, could not reverse cabinet decision is a myth fabricated after the war."

According to Yinan He, associate professor of international relations at Lehigh University, allied countries and Japanese leftists demanded the emperor to abdicate and be tried as a war criminal. However, conservative Japanese elites concocted jingoistic myths that exonerated the nation's ruling class and downplayed Japan's wartime culpability. Such revisionist campaigns depicted the Emperor as a peace-seeking diplomat, while blaming the militarists for hijacking the government and leading the country into a disastrous war. This narrative sought to exonerate the Emperor by shifting responsibility onto a small group of military leaders. Furthermore, numerous Japanese conservative elites lobbied the United States to spare the emperor from war crimes investigations and advocated instead for the prosecution of General Hideki Tojo, who held office as prime minister for most of the Pacific War. This narrative also narrowly focuses on the U.S.–Japan conflict, completely ignores the wars Japan waged in Asia, and disregards the atrocities committed by Japanese troops during the war. Japanese elites created the narrative in an attempt to avoid tarnishing the national image and regain the international acceptance of the country.

Kentarō Awaya said that post-war Japanese public opinion supporting protection of the Emperor was influenced by United States propaganda promoting the view that the Emperor together with the Japanese people had been fooled by the military.

In the years immediately after Hirohito's death, scholars who spoke out against the emperor were threatened and attacked by right-wing extremists. Susan Chira reported, "Scholars who have spoken out against the late Emperor have received threatening phone calls from Japan's extremist right wing." One example of actual violence occurred in 1990 when the mayor of Nagasaki, Hitoshi Motoshima, was shot and critically wounded by a member of the ultranationalist group, Seikijuku. A year before, in 1989, Motoshima had broken what was characterized as "one of [Japan's] most sensitive taboos" by asserting that Emperor Hirohito bore responsibility for World War II.

Regarding Hirohito's exemption from trial before the International Military Tribunal of the Far East, opinions were not unanimous. Sir William Webb, the president of the tribunal, declared: "This immunity of the Emperor is contrasted with the part he played in launching the war in the Pacific, is, I think, a matter which the tribunal should take into consideration in imposing the sentences." Likewise, the French judge, Henri Bernard, wrote about Hirohito's accountability that the declaration of war by Japan "had a principal author who escaped all prosecution and of whom in any case the present defendants could only be considered accomplices."

An account from the Vice Interior Minister in 1941, Michio Yuzawa, asserts that Hirohito was "at ease" with the attack on Pearl Harbor "once he had made a decision."

Since his death in 1989, historians have discovered evidence that prove Hirohito's culpability for the war, and that he was not a passive figurehead manipulated by those around him.

==== Imperial Household sources ====
===== Hirohito's monologue =====
In December 1990, the Bungeishunjū published the Showa tenno dokuhaku roku (Dokuhaku roku), which recorded conversations Hirohito held with five Imperial Household Ministry officials between March and April 1946, containing twenty-four sections. The Dokuhaku roku recorded Hirohito speaking retroactively on topics arranged chronologically from 1919 to 1946, right before the Tokyo War Crimes Trials.

In Hirohito's monologue:

It doesn't matter much if an incident occurs in Manchuria, as it is rural; however, if something were to happen in the Tientsin-Peking area, Anglo-American intervention would likely worsen and could lead to a clash.

While he could justify the aggression of his military in China's northeastern provinces, he lacked confidence in Japan's capacity to win a war against the United States and Britain. He was also more aware than his military commanders of Japan's vulnerability to an economic blockade by Western powers.

Japan signed the Tripartite Pact in 1940 and another agreement in December 1941 that forbade Japan from signing a separate peace treaty with the United States. In the Dokuhaku roku, Hirohito said:

(In 1941,) we thought we could achieve a draw with the US, or at best win by a six to four margin; but total victory was nearly impossible ... When the war actually began, however, we gained a miraculous victory at Pearl Harbor and our invasions of Malaya and Burma succeeded far quicker than expected. So, if not for this (agreement), we might have achieved peace when we were in an advantageous position.

The passage in the Dokuhaku roku refutes the theory that Hirohito wanted an early conclusion to the war owing to his value for peace. Instead, it provides evidence that he desired its end because of Japan's early military victories in Pearl Harbor and Southeast Asia.

In September 1944, Prime Minister Kuniaki Koiso proposed that a settlement and concessions, such as the return of Hong Kong, should be given to Chiang Kai-shek, so that Japanese troops in China could be diverted to the Pacific War. Hirohito rejected the proposal and did not want to give concessions to China because he feared it would signal Japanese weakness, create defeatism at home, and trigger independence movements in occupied countries.

As the war shifted unfavorably for Japan, his sentiments were recorded in the Dokuhaku roku as follows:

I hoped to give the enemy one good bashing somewhere, and then seize a chance for peace. Yet I didn't want to ask for peace before Germany did because then we would lose trust in the international community for having violated that corollary agreement.

As the war front progressed northward, Hirohito persistently hoped for the Japanese military to deliver a "good bashing" at some point during the war, which meant securing a decisive victory and then leveraging that success to negotiate the most favorable terms possible for Japan. In the autumn of 1944, he hoped for a victory at Battle of Leyte Gulf, but Japan suffered defeat. On 14 February 1945, Fumimaro Konoe wrote a proposal to Hirohito, urging him to quell extremist elements within the military and end the war. Konoe argued that although surrendering to America might preserve imperial rule, it would not survive a communist revolution he believed was imminent. Hirohito was troubled by the ambiguity surrounding America's commitment to upholding imperial rule. He considered the advice of Army Chief of Staff Yoshijirō Umezu, who advocated for continuing the fight to the bitter end, believing that the Americans could be lured into a trap on Taiwan, where they could be defeated. However, the Americans avoided Taiwan. Despite the defeat at the Battle of Okinawa and acknowledging Japan's imminent unconditional surrender following this defeat, Hirohito persisted in seeking another battlefield where a "good bashing" could be achieved, considering locations such as Yunnan or Burma.

In August 1945, Hirohito agreed to the Potsdam Declaration because he thought that the American occupation of Japan would uphold imperial rule in Japan.

===== Shinobu Kobayashi's diary =====
Shinobu Kobayashi was the Emperor's chamberlain from April 1974 until June 2000. Kobayashi kept a diary with near-daily remarks of Hirohito for 26 years. It was made public on Wednesday 22 August 2018. According to Takahisa Furukawa, a professor of modern Japanese history at Nihon University, the diary reveals that the emperor "gravely took responsibility for the war for a long time, and as he got older, that feeling became stronger."

Jennifer Lind, associate professor of government at Dartmouth College and a specialist in Japanese war memory said:

"Over the years, these different pieces of evidence have trickled out and historians have amassed this picture of culpability and how he was reflecting on that. This is another piece of the puzzle that very much confirms that the picture that was taking place before, which is that he was extremely culpable, and after the war he was devastated about this."

An entry dated 27 May 1980 said the Emperor wanted to express his regret about the Sino-Japanese war to former Chinese Premier Hua Guofeng who visited at the time, but was stopped by senior members of the Imperial Household Agency owing to fear of backlash from far right groups.

An entry dated 7 April 1987 said the Emperor was haunted by discussions of his wartime responsibility and, as a result, was losing his will to live.

===== Michiji Tajima's notes =====
According to notebooks by Michiji Tajima, a top Imperial Household Agency official who took office after the war, Emperor Hirohito privately expressed regret about the atrocities that were committed by Japanese troops during the Nanjing Massacre. In addition to feeling remorseful about his own role in the war, he "fell short by allowing radical elements of the military to drive the conduct of the war."

===== Saburō Hyakutake's diary =====
In September 2021, 25 diaries, pocket notebooks and memos by Saburō Hyakutake (Emperor Hirohito's Grand Chamberlain from 1936 to 1944) deposited by his relatives to the library of the University of Tokyo's graduate schools for law and politics became available to the public.

Hyakutake's diary quotes some of Hirohito's ministers and advisers as being worried that the Emperor was getting ahead of them in terms of battle preparations.

Thus, Hyakutake quotes Tsuneo Matsudaira, the Imperial Household Minister, saying:

"The Emperor appears to have been prepared for war in the face of the tense times." (13 October 1941)

Likewise, Koichi Kido, Lord Keeper of the Privy Seal, is quoted as saying:

"I occasionally have to try to stop him from going too far." (13 October 1941)

"The Emperor's resolve appears to be going too far." (20 November 1941)

"I requested the Emperor to say things to give the impression that Japan will exhaust all measures to pursue peace when the Foreign Minister is present." (20 November 1941)

Seiichi Chadani, professor of modern Japanese history with Shigakukan University who has studied Hirohito's actions before and during the war said on the discovery of Hyakutake's diary:

"The archives available so far, including his biography compiled by the Imperial Household Agency, contained no detailed descriptions that his aides expressed concerns about Hirohito leaning toward Japan's entry into the war."

"(Hyakutake's diary) is a significant record penned by one of the close aides to the Emperor documenting the process of how Japan's leaders led to the war."

==== Vice Interior Minister Yuzawa's account on Hirohito's role in Pearl Harbor raid ====
In late July 2018, the bookseller Takeo Hatano, an acquaintance of the descendants of Michio Yuzawa (Japanese Vice Interior Minister in 1941), released to Japan's Yomiuri Shimbun newspaper a memo by Yuzawa that Hatano had kept for nine years since he received it from Yuzawa's family. Hatano said: "It took me nine years to come forward, as I was afraid of a backlash. But now I hope the memo would help us figure out what really happened during the war, in which 3.1 million people were killed."

Takahisa Furukawa, expert on wartime history from Nihon University, confirmed the authenticity of the memo, calling it "the first look at the thinking of Emperor Hirohito and Prime Minister Hideki Tojo on the eve of the Japanese attack on Pearl Harbor." Although not definitive, the five-page document supports the perspective that Hirohito holds at least some responsibility for initiating the war.

In this document, Yuzawa details a conversation he had with Tojo a few hours before the attack. The Vice Minister quotes Tojo saying:

"The Emperor seemed at ease and unshakable once he had made a decision."

"If His Majesty had any regret over negotiations with Britain and the U.S., he would have looked somewhat grim. There was no such indication, which must be a result of his determination. I'm completely relieved. Given the current conditions, I could say we have practically won already."

Historian Furukawa concluded from Yuzawa's memo:

"Tojo is a bureaucrat who was incapable of making own decisions, so he turned to the Emperor as his supervisor. That's why he had to report everything for the Emperor to decide. If the Emperor didn't say no, then he would proceed."

Furukawa further added that the memo supported the view that Hirohito was less opposed to war with the United States than earlier portrayals have indicated. The memo confirmed that during a meeting on December 1, Hirohito approved the government's decision to abandon diplomacy and maintained this position on the eve of the attack. Yuzawa's account depicts Tojo as calm and optimistic after completing all the necessary administrative preparations for war. Most importantly, Tojo drew confidence from Hirohito's final approval, given without any questions or objections.

==== Chief Military Aide-de-Camp Takeji Nara's diary ====
The diary of Japanese general Takeji Nara documented Nara's interactions with the emperor and described Hirohito's reactions to Japan's role in instigating the Mukden Incident. Nara's diary entries show that Hirohito was well aware of the Mukden Incident and acknowledged that Japanese General Kanji Ishiwara was its instigator. However, once the emperor justified that the army's actions in Manchuria as necessary, he gradually adapted to the new circumstances and showed little desire to punish those responsible.

=== Evidence against wartime culpability ===
==== British government assessment of Hirohito ====
The declassified January 1989 British government assessment of Hirohito describes him as "too weak to alter the course of events" and Hirohito was "powerless" and comparisons with Hitler are "ridiculously wide off the mark." Hirohito's power was limited by ministers and the military and if he asserted his views too much he would have been replaced by another member of the royal family.

The dispatch by John Whitehead, former ambassador of the United Kingdom to Japan, to Foreign Secretary Geoffrey Howe was declassified on Thursday 20 July 2017 at the National Archives in London. The letter was written shortly after Hirohito's death. Whitehead wrote that Hirohito was "uneasy with Japan's drift to war in the 1930s and 1940s but was too weak to alter the course of events." Whitehead also wrote:

"By personality and temperament, Hirohito was ill-suited to the role assigned to him by destiny. The successors of the men who had led the Meiji Restoration yearned for a charismatic warrior king. Instead, they were given an introspective prince who grew up to be more at home in the science laboratory than on the military parade ground. But in his early years, every effort was made to cast him in a different mould."

"A man of stronger personality than Hirohito might have tried more strenuously to check the growing influence of the military in Japanese politics and the drift of Japan toward war with the western powers." "The contemporary diary evidence suggests that Hirohito was uncomfortable with the direction of Japanese policy." "The consensus of those who have studied the documents of the period is that Hirohito was consistent in attempting to use his personal influence to induce caution and to moderate and even obstruct the growing impetus toward war."

Whitehead concludes that ultimately Hirohito was "powerless" and comparisons with Hitler are "ridiculously wide off the mark." If Hirohito acted too insistently with his views he could have been isolated or replaced with a more pliant member of the royal family. The pre-war Meiji Constitution defined Hirohito as "sacred" and all-powerful, but according to Whitehead, Hirohito's power was limited by ministers and the military. Whitehead explained after World War II that Hirohito's humility was fundamental for the Japanese people to accept the new 1947 constitution and allied occupation.

=== Hirohito's statements ===
8 September 1975 TV interview with NBC, USA
Reporter: "How far has your Majesty been involved in Japan's decision to end the war in 1945? What was the motivation for your launch?"
Emperor: "Originally, this should be done by the Cabinet. I heard the results, but at the last meeting I asked for a decision. I decided to end the war on my own. (...) I thought that the continuation of the war would only bring more misery to the people."
Interview with Newsweek, USA, 20 September 1975
Reporter: "(Abbreviation) How do you answer those who claim that your Majesty was also involved in the decision-making process that led Japan to start the war?"
Emperor: "(Omission) At the start of the war, a cabinet decision was made, and I could not reverse that decision. We believe this is consistent with the provisions of the Imperial Constitution."
22 September 1975 – Press conference with Foreign Correspondents
Reporter: "How long before the attack on Pearl Harbor did your Majesty know about the attack plan? And did you approve the plan?"
Emperor: "It is true that I had received information on military operations in advance. However, I only received those reports after the military commanders made detailed decisions. Regarding issues of political character and military command, I believe that I acted in accordance with the provisions of the Constitution."
On 31 October 1975, a press conference was held immediately after returning to Japan after visiting the United States.
Question: "Your majesty, at your White House banquet you said, 'I deeply deplore that unfortunate war.' (See also Emperor Shōwa's Theory of War Responsibility.) Does your majesty feel responsibility for the war itself, including the opening of hostilities? Also, what does your majesty think about so-called war responsibility?" (The Times reporter)
Emperor: "I can't answer that kind of question because I haven't thoroughly studied the literature in this field, and so don't really appreciate the nuances of your words."
Question: "How did you understand that the atomic bomb was dropped on Hiroshima at the end of the war?" (RCC Broadcasting Reporter)
Emperor: "I am sorry that the atomic bomb was dropped, but because of this war, I feel sorry for the citizens of Hiroshima, but I think it is unavoidable."
17 April 1981 Press conference with the presidents of the press
Reporter: "What was the most enjoyable of your memories of eighty years?"
Emperor: "Since I saw the constitutional politics of Britain as the Crown prince, I felt strongly that I must adhere to the constitutional politics. But I was too particular about it to prevent the war. I made my own decisions twice (February 26 Incident and the end of World War II)."

== Honors ==
=== National ===
- Founder of the Order of Culture, 11 February 1937

=== Foreign military appointments ===
- United Kingdom: Honorary General in the British Army, May 1921
- United Kingdom: Field Marshal of the Regular Army in the British Army, June 1930

=== Foreign orders ===
- Finland: Grand Cross of the Order of the White Rose of Finland with Collar (1942)
- Norway: Grand Cross of the Order of Saint Olav with Collar (26 September 1922)
- Sweden: Knight of the Royal Order of the Seraphim with Collar (8 May 1919)
- Denmark: Knight of the Order of the Elephant (24 January 1923)
- Poland: Knight of the Order of the White Eagle (1922)
- Thailand:
  - Knight of the Order of the Rajamitrabhorn (27 May 1963)
  - Knight of the Order of the Royal House of Chakri (30 January 1925)
- Nepal: Member of the Most Glorious Order of Ojaswi Rajanya (19 April 1960)
- Philippines: Grand Collar of the Order of Sikatuna (28 September 1966)
- Brazil: Grand Cross of the National Order of the Southern Cross (1955)
- Kingdom of Italy: Knight of the Supreme Order of the Most Holy Annunciation (31 October 1916)
- Italy: Grand Cross of the Order of Merit of the Italian Republic with Collar (9 March 1982)
- Malaysia: Honorary Recipient of the Order of the Crown of the Realm (1964)
- Tonga: Grand Cross of the Royal Order of Pouono with Collar
- United Kingdom:
  - Honorary Knight Grand Cross of the Order of the Bath (civil division) (May 1921)
  - Stranger Knight Companion of the Order of the Garter (3 May 1929; revoked in 1941; reinstated on 22 May 1971)
  - Fellow of the Royal Society (1971)
- Spain: Knight of the Order of the Golden Fleece (6 October 1928)
- Spain: Grand Cross of the Royal and Distinguished Order of Charles III with Collar (4 June 1923)
- Czechoslovakia: Collar of the Order of the White Lion (1928)
- Yugoslavia: Order of the Yugoslav Great Star (8 April 1968)
- Ethiopian Empire: Collar of the Order of Solomon
- Russian Empire: Knight of the Order of Saint Andrew the Apostle the First-called (September 1916)

== Issue ==
Emperor Shōwa and Empress Kōjun had seven children (two sons and five daughters).

Name	Birth	Death	Marriage		Children
Name	Birth	Death	Date	Spouse	Children
Shigeko Higashikuni (Shigeko, Princess Teru)	9 December 1925	23 July 1961	10 October 1943	Prince Morihiro Higashikuni	Prince Nobuhiko Higashikuni; Princess Fumiko Higashikuni; Naohiko Higashikuni; Hidehiko Higashikuni; Yūko Higashikuni
Sachiko, Princess Hisa	10 September 1927	8 March 1928	None		
Kazuko Takatsukasa (Kazuko, Princess Taka)	30 September 1929	26 May 1989	20 May 1950	Toshimichi Takatsukasa	Naotake Takatsukasa (adopted)
Atsuko Ikeda (Atsuko, Princess Yori)	7 March 1931 (age 95)		10 October 1952	Takamasa Ikeda	Motohiro Ikeda (adopted)
Akihito, Emperor Emeritus of Japan (Akihito, Prince Tsugu)	23 December 1933 (age 92)		10 April 1959	Michiko Shōda	Naruhito, Emperor of Japan; Fumihito, Crown Prince of Japan; Sayako Kuroda
Masahito, Prince Hitachi (Masahito, Prince Yoshi)	28 November 1935 (age 90)		30 September 1964	Hanako Tsugaru	None
Takako Shimazu (Takako, Princess Suga)	2 March 1939 (age 87)		10 March 1960	Hisanaga Shimazu	Yoshihisa Shimazu

== Scientific publications ==
- (1967) A review of the hydroids of the family Clathrozonidae with description of a new genus and species from Japan.
- (1969) Some hydroids from the Amakusa Islands.
- (1971) Additional notes on Clathrozoon wilsoni Spencer.
- (1974) Some hydrozoans of the Bonin Islands.
- (1977) Five hydroid species from the Gulf of Aqaba, Red Sea.
- (1983) Hydroids from Izu Oshima and Nijima.
- (1984) A new hydroid Hydractinia bayeri n. sp. (family Hydractiniidae) from the Bay of Panama.
- (1988) The hydroids of Sagami Bay collected by His Majesty the Emperor of Japan.
- (1995) The hydroids of Sagami Bay II. (posthumous)

== See also ==
- Controversies regarding the role of the Emperor of Japan
- Postwar Japan
- Japanese nationalism
- List of state visits received by Hirohito

== Notes ==
Hirohito Imperial House of Japan Born: 29 April 1901 Died: 7 January 1989
Regnal titles
Preceded by Taishō	Emperor of Japan; 25 December 1926 – 7 January 1989	Succeeded by Akihito
