= Brian S. Hartley =

British biochemist (1926–2021)

Brian Hartley FRS
- Born: Brian Selby Hartley; 16 April 1926; Rawtenstall, Lancashire, England
- Died: 3 May 2021 (aged 95)
- Education: University of Cambridge (BA, MA); University of Leeds (PhD)
- Known for: Studies of chymotrypsin
- Scientific career
- Thesis: The chemistry and biochemistry of certain organic phosphorus esters with special reference to the inhibition of chymotrypsin (1952)
- Doctoral advisor: Bernard A. Kilby; Malcolm Dixon
- Doctoral students: Michael Neuberger; Gregory Winter
- Website: royalsociety.org/people/brian-hartley-11577

Brian Selby Hartley (16 April 1926 – 3 May 2021) FRS was a British biochemist. He was Professor of Biochemistry at Imperial College London from 1974 to 1991.

== Education ==
Hartley was educated at Queens' College, Cambridge graduating with a Bachelor of Arts in 1947 followed by a Master of Arts degree in 1952. He moved to the University of Leeds where he was awarded a PhD in 1952 for research supervised by Malcolm Dixon and Bernard A. Kilby.

== Career and research ==
From 1952 to 1964, Hartley pioneered work on the sequence and mechanism of the enzyme chymotrypsin in Cambridge, and developed the use of paper chromatography to separate amino acids and peptides — an essential part of protein characterisation at that time. In 1965, he became a founding member of the Medical Research Council (MRC) Laboratory of Molecular Biology (LMB), and collaborated with David Mervyn Blow in determining the structure and mechanism of chymotrypsin, as part of extensive work on chymotrypsin and related enzymes. His group also showed that mammalian serine proteases, including the blood clotting cascade, had homologous structures and mechanisms, indicating a common evolutionary origin. Hartley also studied other enzymes, such as aminoacyl tRNA synthetases (with Alan Fersht), xylose isomerase and glucose isomerase.

In 1974, Hartley became Head of the Department of Biochemistry at Imperial College London, converting it into a centre for molecular biology. In 1982, he conceived the need for a discipline – biotechnology – to exploit molecular biology breakthroughs. He left the Department of Biochemistry to set up Imperial's Centre for Biotechnology, and became a founding board member of Biogen – the longest surviving genetic engineering company. Since then, Hartley has founded companies to make cheap bioethanol from waste hemicellulosic biomass, using genetically engineered compost heap microorganisms.

== Awards and honours ==
Hartley was elected a Fellow of the Royal Society (FRS) in 1971. His certificate of election reads:

Distinguished for his studies on the structure and mode of action of the proteolytic enzymes. In particular, he has determined the complete amino acid sequence of chymotrypsinogen, a protein of 253 residues, and has studied the relationship of this structure to enzymic activity. He has developed two important new techniques in protein chemistry: the "dansyl" methods for determining sequences in peptides on a very small scale, and the "diagonal" technique for studying the distribution of disulphide bridges in proteins. His comparative studies on other pancreatic proteolytic enzymes have revealed interesting homologies, which give information about the biological origin of the proteins and their mode of action. His earlier kinetic studies on chymotrypsin demonstrated the formation of an acyl enzyme as an intermediate in the hydrolysis reaction.
