= List of fellows of the Royal Society elected in 1971 =

Fellows of the Royal Society elected in 1971.

== Fellows ==
1. Norman Henry Ashton
2. John Herbert Beynon
3. Brian Blundell Boycott
4. Alan Carrington
5. Douglas Harold Copp
6. Geoffrey Sharman Dawes
7. Michael Ellis Fisher
8. David Victor Glass
9. Sir John Gurdon
10. Brian S. Hartley
11. Lionel Haworth
12. Raymond Hide
13. Sir John Kingman
14. Joel Mandelstam
15. Eric Harold Mansfield
16. Walter Marshall, Baron Marshall of Goring
17. John Lennox Monteith
18. Frank Reginald Nunes Nabarro
19. Arthur Charles Neish
20. Paul Robert Owen
21. John Charles Polanyi
22. Adrian Frank Posnette
23. Richard Edmund Reason
24. Florence Gwendolen Rees
25. John Donald Rose
26. George William Series
27. Robert Millner Shackleton
28. Trevor Ian Shaw
29. Basil Weedon
30. Alan Marmaduke Wetherell
31. Harry Blackmore Whittington
32. Douglas Robert Wilkie

== Foreign members ==
1. Henri Cartan
2. Stephen Kuffler
3. Kurt Mothes
4. Karl Ziegler

== Statute 12 ==
1. Hirohito, Emperor of Japan
