= Emperor Taishō =

Emperor of Japan from 1912 to 1926

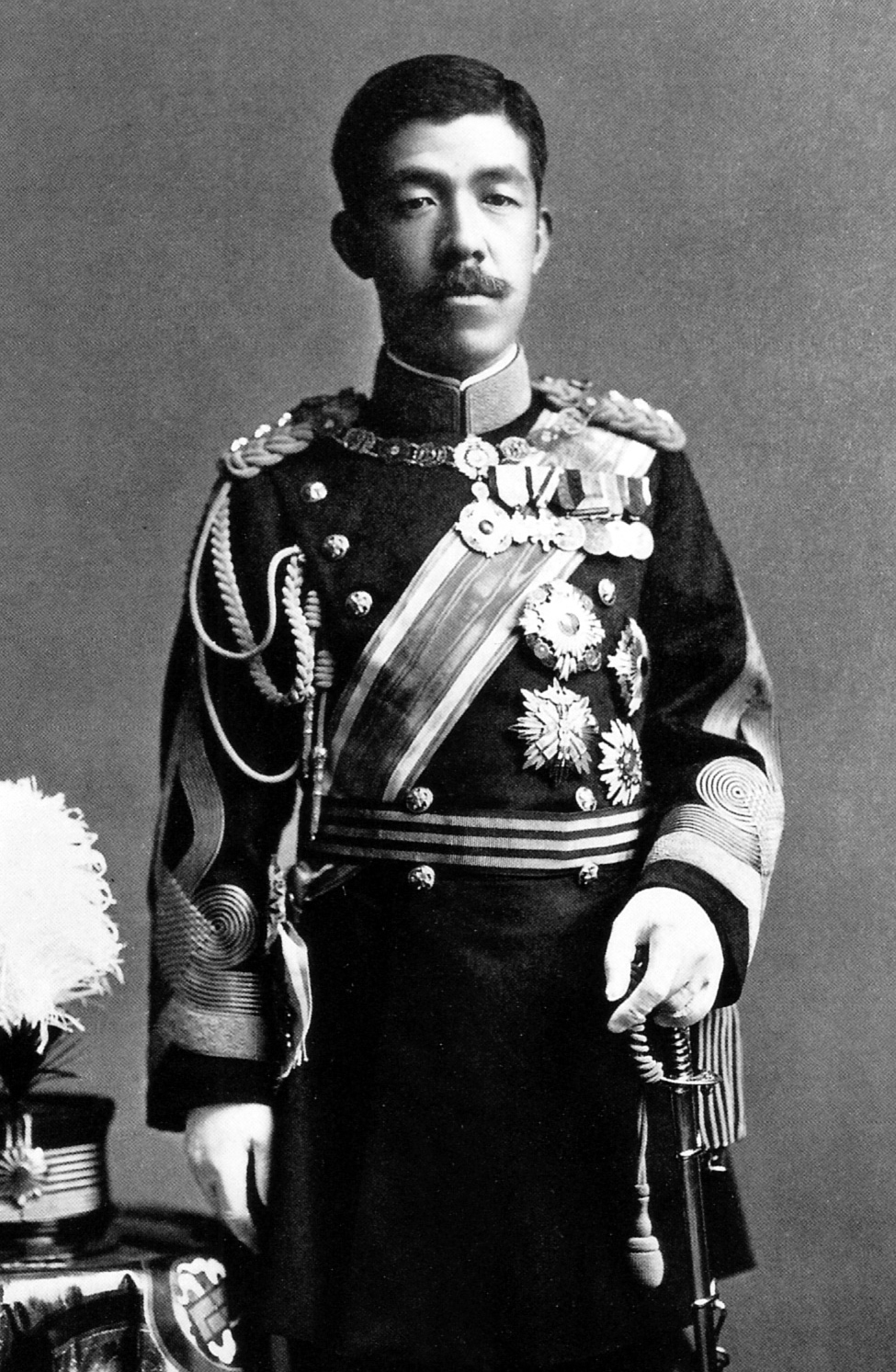
- Formal portrait, 1912

Emperor of Japan
- Reign: 29 July 1912 – 25 December 1926
- Enthronement: 10 November 1915
- Predecessor: Meiji
- Successor: Shōwa
- Regent: Crown Prince Hirohito (1921‍–‍1926)
- Born: Yoshihito, Prince Haru (明宮嘉仁親王); 31 August 1879; Tōgū Palace, Tokyo, Japan
- Died: 25 December 1926 (aged 47); Hayama Imperial Villa, Kanagawa, Japan
- Burial: 8 February 1927; Musashi Imperial Graveyard
- Spouse: Sadako Kujō (m. 1900)
- Issue: Hirohito, Emperor Shōwa; Yasuhito, Prince Chichibu; Nobuhito, Prince Takamatsu; Takahito, Prince Mikasa
Era name and dates
- Taishō: 30 July 1912 – 25 December 1926
Posthumous name
- Tsuigō: Emperor Taishō (大正天皇)
- House: Imperial House of Japan
- Father: Emperor Meiji
- Mother: Yanagiwara Naruko
- Religion: Shinto

Emperor Taishō (Note: Japanese: 大正, pronounced [tai.ɕoː]) (31 August 1879 – 25 December 1926), personal name (imina) Yoshihito, was Emperor of Japan from 29 July 1912 until his death in 1926. His reign was marked by a domestic political shift toward liberal democracy, called Taishō Democracy. He oversaw Japan's participation in World War I on the side of the Allies, the Spanish flu epidemic, and the Great Kantō Earthquake of 1923. His poor health limited his public duties and contributed to his death at age 47.

Born to Emperor Meiji and his concubine Yanagiwara Naruko, Yoshihito was proclaimed crown prince and heir apparent in 1888, his two older siblings having died in infancy. He suffered various health problems as a child, including meningitis soon after his birth. In 1900, he married Sadako Kujō, a member of the Kujō family of the Fujiwara clan; the couple had four sons. In 1912, Yoshihito became emperor upon the death of his father, but as he suffered from neurological issues for much of his life, he played only a limited role in politics and undertook no official duties from 1919. His declining health led to the appointment of his eldest son, Crown Prince Hirohito, as regent in 1921, and Hirohito succeeded him as emperor when he died aged 47 at Hayama Imperial Villa in Kanagawa Prefecture.

== Early life ==
Prince Yoshihito was born at the Tōgū Palace in Akasaka, Tokyo to Emperor Meiji and Yanagiwara Naruko, a concubine with the official title of gon-no-tenji (imperial concubine). As was common practice at the time, Emperor Meiji's consort, Empress Shōken, was officially regarded as his mother. He received the personal name of Yoshihito Shinnō and the title Haru-no-miya from the Emperor on 6 September 1879. His two older siblings had died in infancy, and he too, was born sickly.

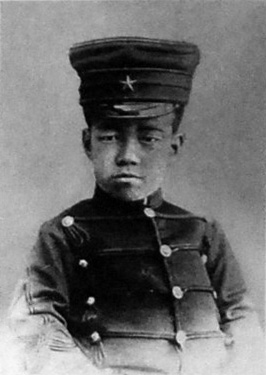
Yoshihito in 1892.

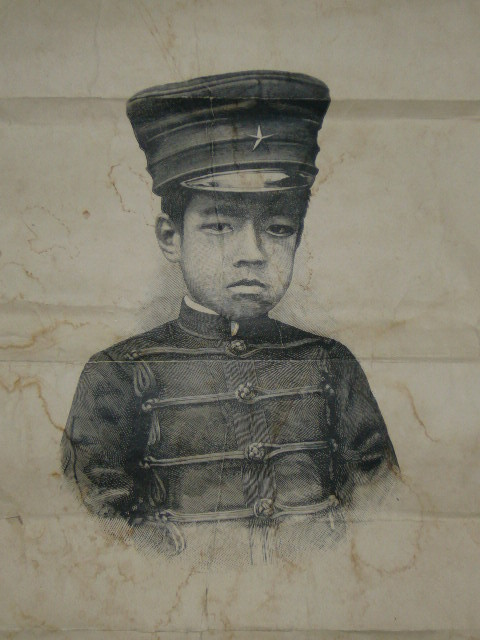
Yoshihito in 1900.

Prince Yoshihito contracted cerebral meningitis within three weeks of his birth.

As was the practice at the time, Prince Yoshihito was entrusted to the care of his great-grandfather, Marquess Nakayama Tadayasu, in whose house he lived from infancy until the age of seven. Prince Nakayama had also raised Taishō's father, the Emperor Meiji, as a child.

From March 1885, Prince Yoshihito moved to the Aoyama Detached Palace, where he was tutored in the mornings on reading, writing, arithmetic, and morals, and in the afternoons on sports, but progress was slow due to his poor health and frequent fevers. From 1886, he was taught together with 15–20 selected classmates from the ōke and higher ranking kazoku peerage at a special school, the Gogakumonsho, within the Aoyama Palace.

Yoshihito was officially declared heir on 31 August 1887, and had his formal investiture as crown prince on 3 November 1888. While crown prince, he was often referred to simply as Tōgu (東宮) ('Eastern Palace', a metonymy for heir to the throne, which originated from China's Han dynasty).

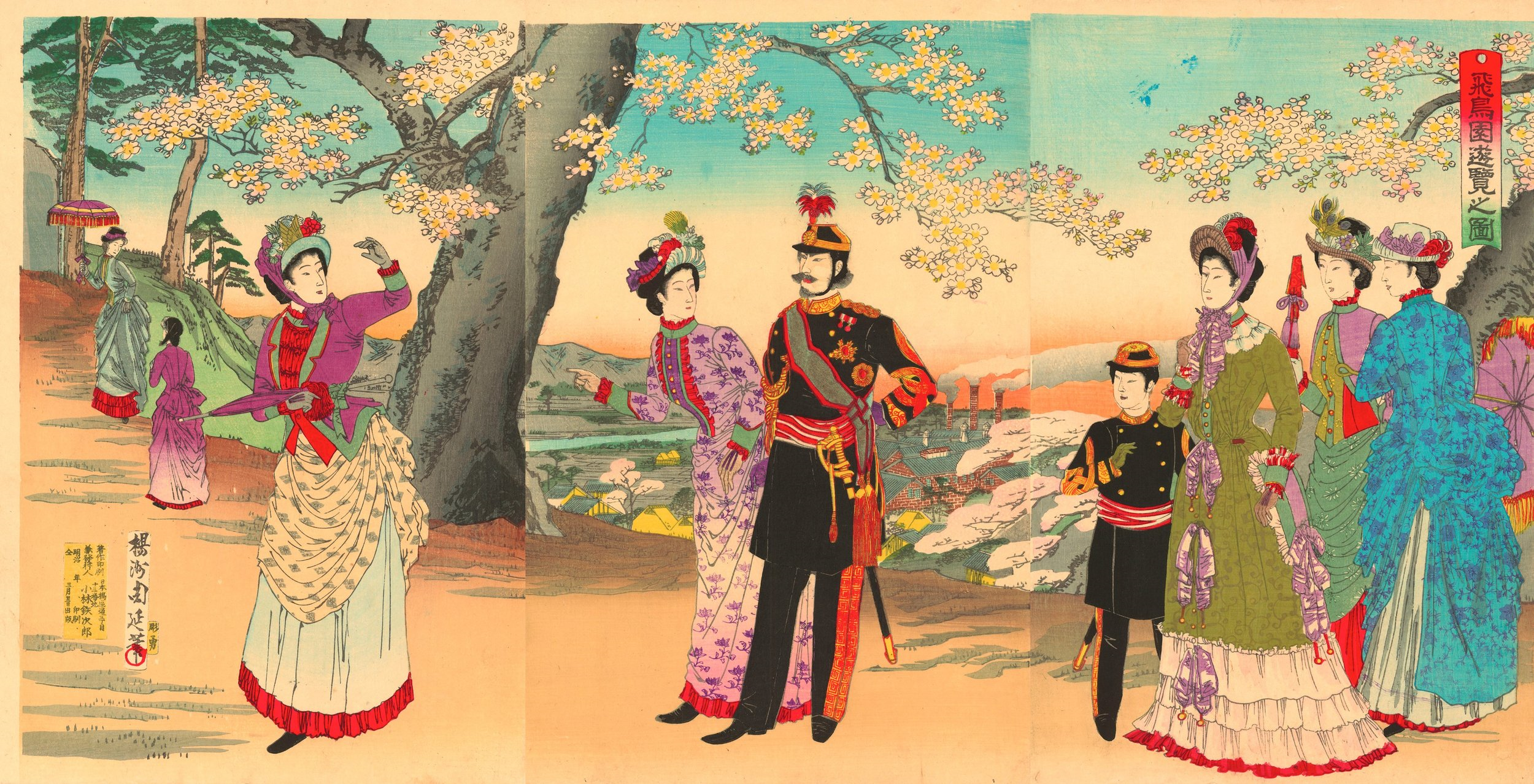
Crown Prince Tōgu with his father and stepmother strolling in Asukayama Park accompanied by ladies of the court. Colour woodblock print by Yōshū Chikanobu, 1890

=== Education and training ===
When Yoshihito became of the age to enter elementary school in 1886, due to his health problems, Takehiko Yumoto was appointed as the special education officer to educate him within the Tōgū Palace. For these health reasons, he spent much of his youth at the Imperial villas at Hayama and Numazu, both of which are located by the sea. Although the prince showed skill in some areas, such as horse riding, he proved to be poor in areas requiring higher-level thought. He was finally withdrawn from Gakushuin before finishing the middle school course in 1894. However, he did appear to have an aptitude for languages and continued to receive extensive tutoring in French, Chinese, and history from private tutors at the Akasaka Palace; Emperor Meiji gave Prince Takehito responsibility for taking care of Prince Yoshihito, and the two princes became friends.

From 1898, largely at the insistence of Itō Hirobumi, the Prince began to attend sessions of the House of Peers of the Diet of Japan as a way of learning about the political and military concerns of the country. In the same year, he gave his first official receptions to foreign diplomats, with whom he was able to shake hands and converse graciously. His infatuation with western culture and tendency to sprinkle French words into his conversations was a source of irritation for Emperor Meiji.

In October 1898, the Prince also traveled from the Numazu Imperial Villa to Kobe, Hiroshima, and Etajima, visiting sites connected with the Imperial Japanese Navy. He made another tour in 1899 to Kyūshū, visiting government offices, schools and factories (such as Yawata Iron and Steel in Fukuoka and the Mitsubishi shipyards in Nagasaki).

== Marriage ==
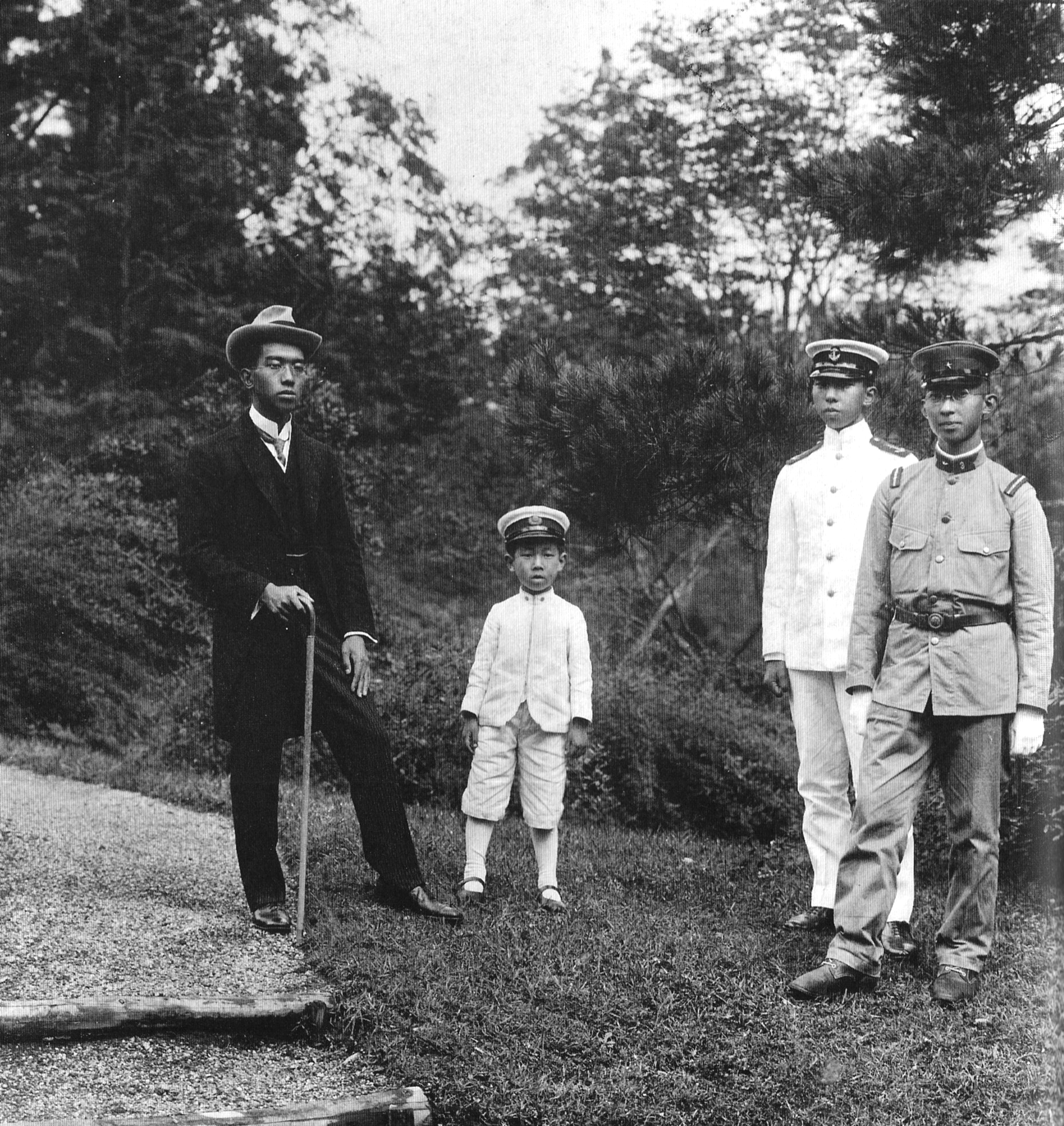
Emperor Taishō's four sons in 1921: Hirohito, Takahito, Nobuhito and Yasuhito

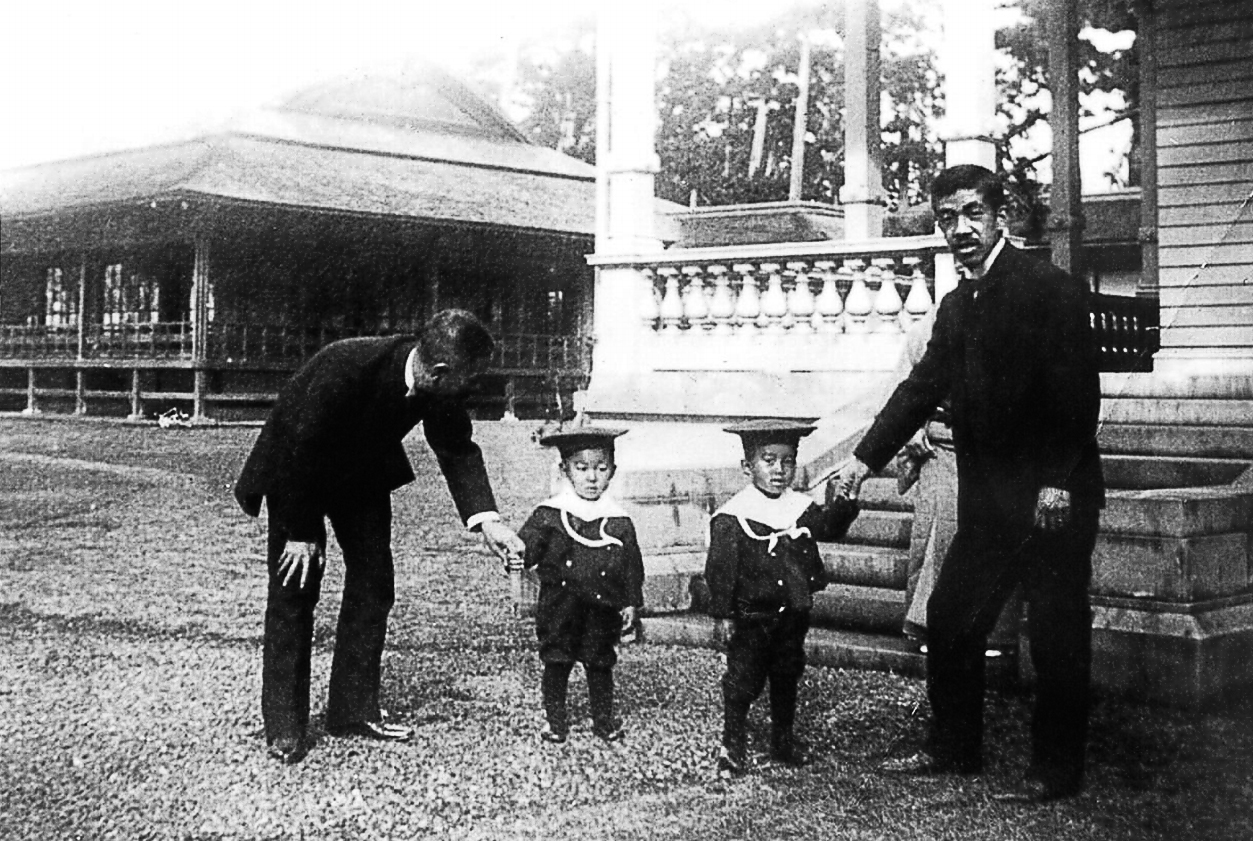
Crown prince (right) in 1904

On 10 May 1900, 20-year-old Crown Prince Yoshihito married the then 15-year-old Kujō Sadako, daughter of Prince Kujō Michitaka, the head of the five senior branches of the Fujiwara clan. She had been carefully selected by Emperor Meiji for her intelligence, articulation, and pleasant disposition and dignity, to complement Prince Yoshihito in the areas where he was lacking. The Akasaka Palace was constructed from 1899 to 1909 in a lavish European rococo style, to serve as the Crown Prince's official residence. The Prince and Princess had the following children: Hirohito, Yasuhito, Nobuhito, and Takahito.

In 1902, Yoshihito continued his tours to observe the customs and geography of Japan, this time in central Honshū, where he visited the Buddhist temple of Zenkō-ji in Nagano. With tensions rising between Japan and Russia, Yoshihito was promoted in 1903 to the rank of colonel in the Imperial Japanese Army and captain in the Imperial Japanese Navy. His military duties were only ceremonial, but he traveled to inspect military facilities in Wakayama, Ehime, Kagawa and Okayama that year.

In October 1907, the Crown Prince toured Korea, accompanied by Admiral Tōgō Heihachirō, General Katsura Tarō, and Prince Arisugawa Taruhito. It was the first time an heir apparent to the throne had ever left Japan. During this period, he began studying the Korean language, although he never became proficient at it.

=== Issue ===
Emperor Taishō and Empress Teimei had four sons and twelve grandchildren (five grandsons and seven granddaughters).

Name	Birth	Death	Marriage		Their children
Name	Birth	Death	Date	Spouse	Their children
Hirohito, Emperor Shōwa (Hirohito, Prince Michi)	29 April 1901	7 January 1989	26 January 1924	Princess Nagako of Kuni	Shigeko Higashikuni (Shigeko, Princess Teru); Sachiko, Princess Hisa; Kazuko Takatsukasa (Kazuko, Princess Taka); Atsuko Ikeda (Atsuko, Princess Yori); Emperor Emeritus Akihito (Akihito, Prince Tsugu); Masahito, Prince Hitachi (Masahito, Prince Yoshi); Takako Shimazu (Takako, Princess Suga)
Yasuhito, Prince Chichibu (Yasuhito, Prince Atsu)	25 June 1902	4 January 1953	28 September 1928	Setsuko Matsudaira	none
Nobuhito, Prince Takamatsu (Nobuhito, Prince Teru)	3 January 1905	3 February 1987	4 February 1930	Kikuko Tokugawa	none
Takahito, Prince Mikasa (Takahito, Prince Sumi)	2 December 1915	27 October 2016	22 October 1941	Yuriko Takagi	Yasuko Konoe (Princess Yasuko of Mikasa); Prince Tomohito of Mikasa; Yoshihito, Prince Katsura; Masako Sen (Princess Masako of Mikasa); Norihito, Prince Takamado

== Reign ==
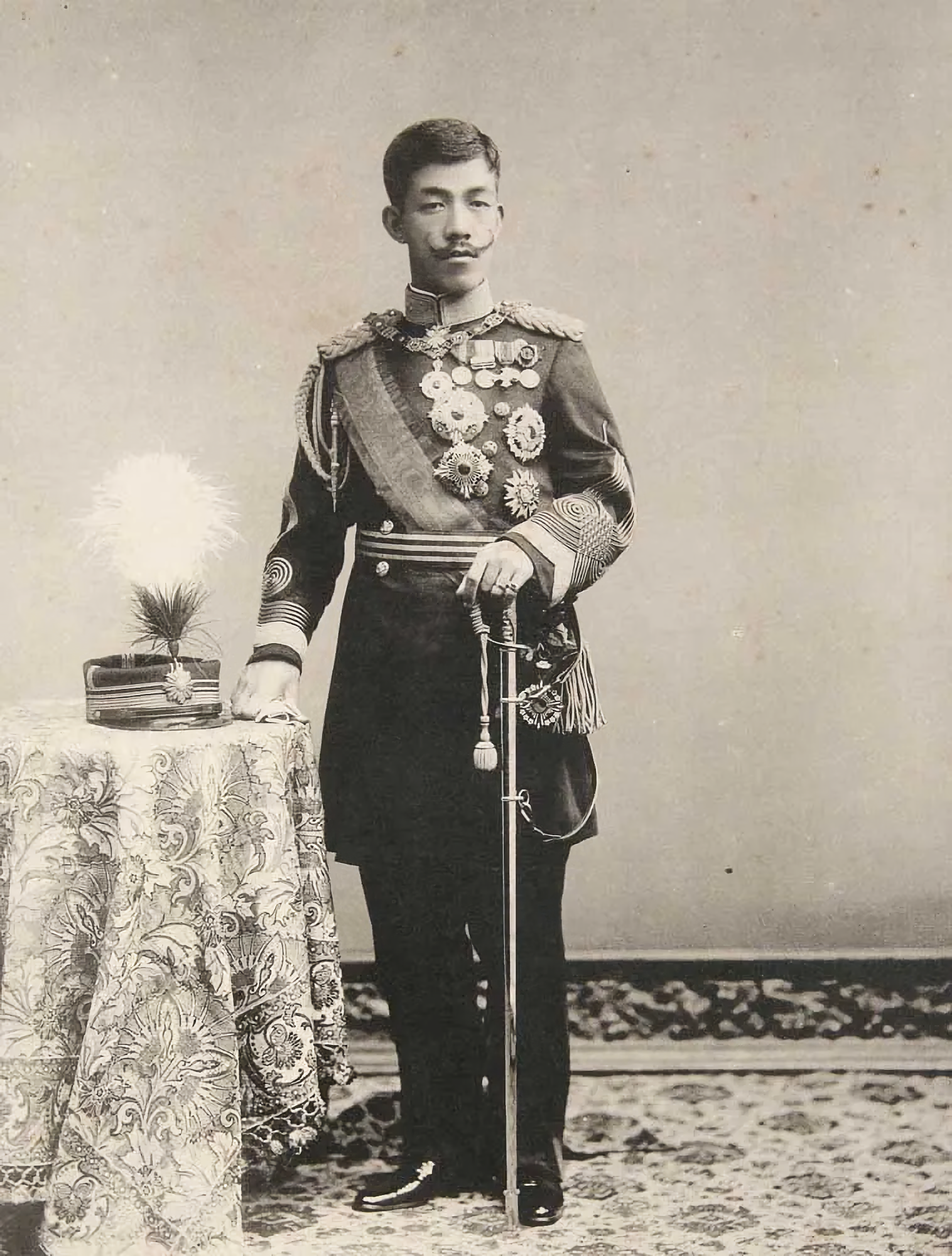
Emperor Taishō in 1912

Banquet in 1915, Nijo castle.

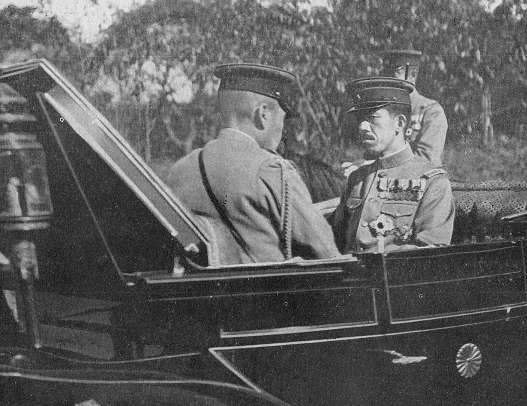
Emperor Taishō on his way to the opening ceremony of the Imperial Diet in 1917, during World War I

On 29 July 1912, upon the death of his father, Emperor Meiji, Prince Yoshihito ascended the throne. The new emperor was kept out of view of the public as much as possible, having suffered from various neurological problems. At the 1913 opening of the Imperial Diet of Japan, one of the rare occasions he was seen in public, he is famously reported to have rolled his prepared speech into a cylinder and stared at the assembly through it, as if through a spyglass. Although rumors attributed this to poor mental condition, others, including those who knew him well, believed that he may have been checking to make sure the speech was rolled up properly, as his manual dexterity was also handicapped.

His lack of articulation and charisma, his disabilities and his eccentricities, led to an increase in incidents of lèse majesté. As his condition deteriorated, he had less and less interest in daily political affairs, and the ability of the genrō, Keeper of the Privy Seal, and Imperial Household Minister to manipulate his decisions came to be a matter of common knowledge. The two-party political system that had been developing in Japan since the turn of the century came of age after World War I, giving rise to the nickname for the period, "Taishō Democracy", prompting a shift in political power to the Imperial Diet of Japan and the democratic parties.

After 1918, the emperor no longer was able to attend Army or Navy maneuvers, appear at the graduation ceremonies of the military academies, perform the annual Shinto ritual ceremonies, or even attend the official opening of sessions of the Diet of Japan.

After 1919, he undertook no official duties, and Crown Prince Hirohito was named prince regent (sesshō) on 25 November 1921.

The emperor's reclusive life was unaffected by the Spanish Flu Pandemic of 1918 and Great Kantō Earthquake of 1923. Fortuitously, he had moved by imperial train to Tamozawa Imperial Villa at Nikko the week before the devastating calamity; but his son, Crown Prince Hirohito, remained at the Imperial Palace where he was at the heart of the event. Carrier pigeons kept the Emperor informed as information about the extent of the devastation became known.

== Death ==
Funeral of Emperor Taishō

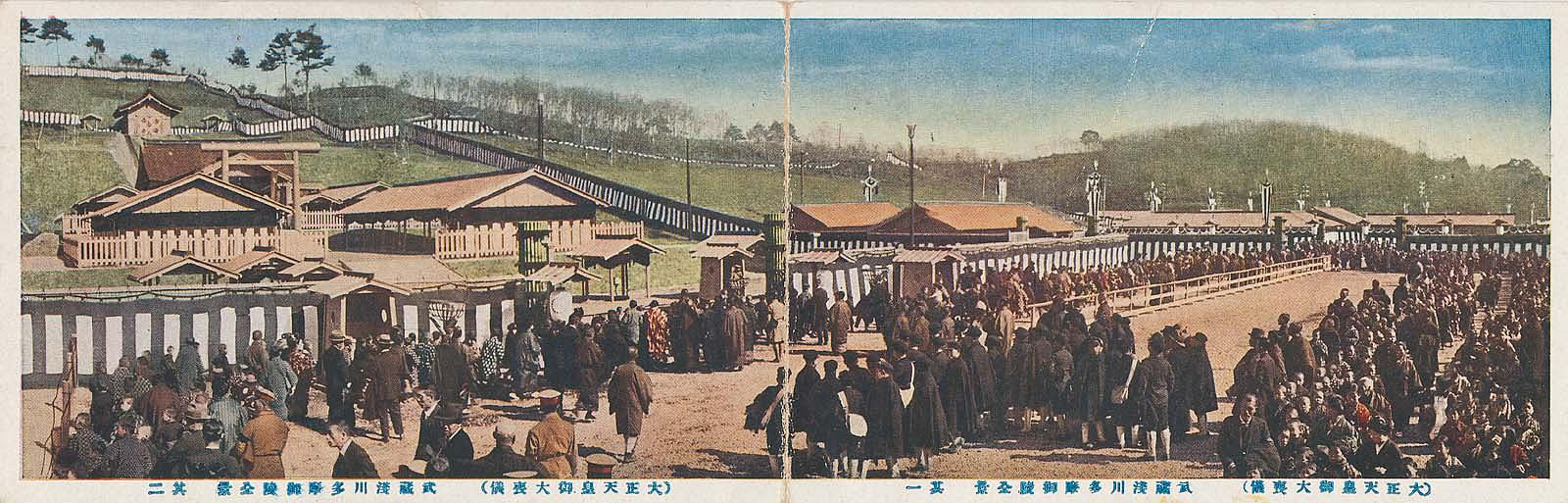
Funeral of Emperor Taishō in Tokyo

In early December 1926, it was announced that the emperor had pneumonia. He died of a heart attack at 1:25 a.m. on 25 December 1926, aged 47, at the Hayama Imperial Villa at Hayama, on Sagami Bay south of Tokyo (in Kanagawa Prefecture). He was succeeded by his eldest son, Hirohito, Emperor Shōwa.

Emperor Taishō's state funeral was held at night on 7 February 1927, extending into the next day, and consisted of a 4-mile-long procession in which 20,000 mourners followed a herd of sacred bulls and an ox-drawn cart containing the imperial coffin. The funeral route was lit with wood fires in iron lanterns. The emperor's coffin was then transported to his mausoleum in the western suburbs of Tokyo.

Emperor Taishō has been called the first Tokyo Emperor because he was the first to live his entire life in or near Tokyo. His father was born and reared in Kyoto; and although he later lived and died in Tokyo, Emperor Meiji's mausoleum is located on the outskirts of Kyoto, near the tombs of his imperial forebears; but Emperor Taishō's grave is in Tokyo, in the Musashi Imperial Graveyard in Hachiōji. His wife, Empress Teimei, his son, Emperor Shōwa and his daughter-in-law, Empress Nagako are buried near him.

== Honours ==
=== National honours ===
- Grand Cordon of the Supreme Order of the Chrysanthemum, 3 November 1889; Collar, 10 May 1900
- Order of the Golden Kite, 3rd class, 1 April 1906

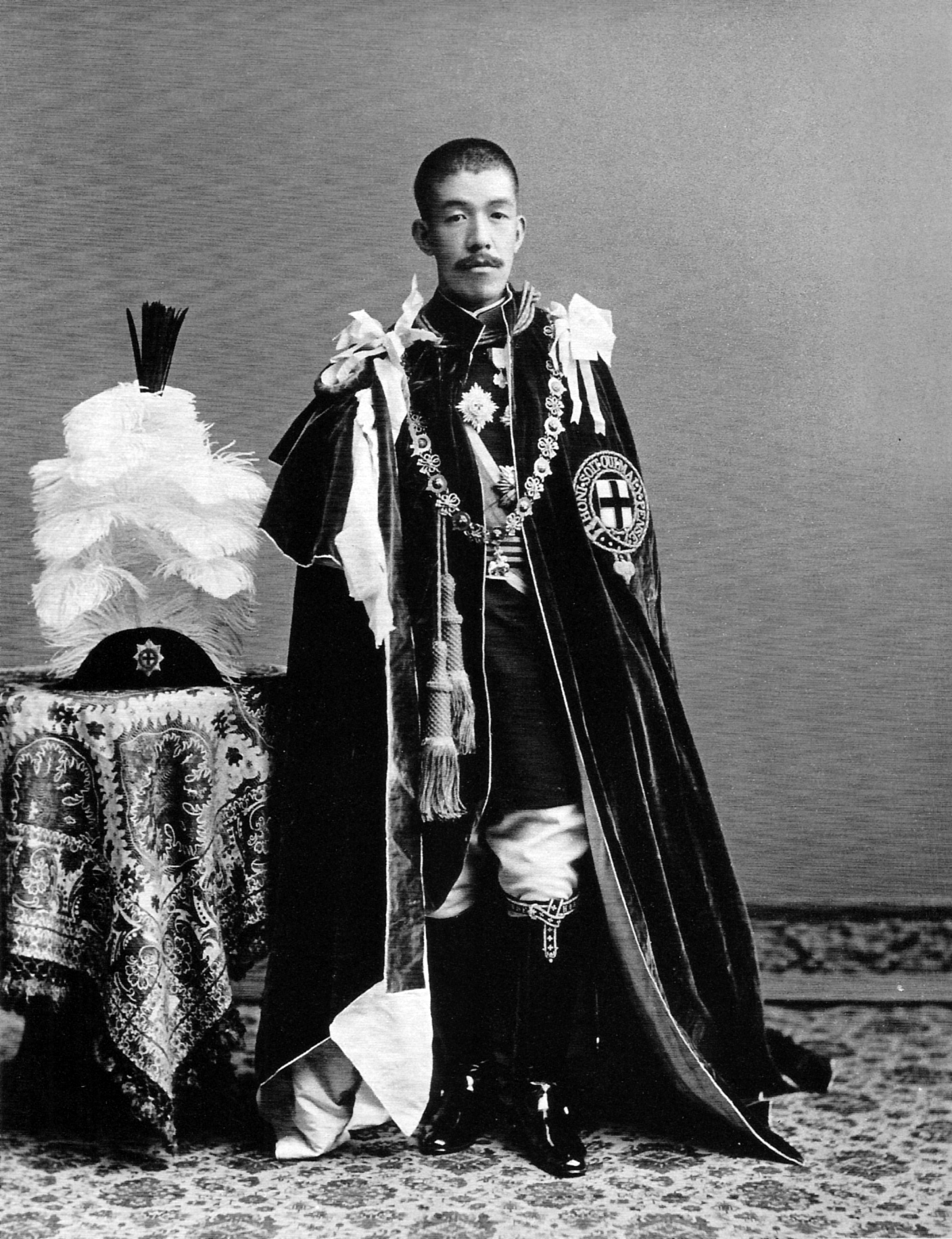
Emperor Taishō in the robes of the Order of the Garter

=== Foreign honours ===
- Austria-Hungary: Grand Cross of the Order of St. Stephen, 18 July 1900
- Belgium: Grand Cordon of the Order of Leopold (military), July 1898
- Denmark: Knight of the Order of the Elephant, 9 October 1899
- France: Grand Cross of the Legion of Honour, 3 May 1899
- German Empire: Knight of the Order of the Black Eagle, 21 December 1899
  - Kingdom of Bavaria: Knight of the Order of St. Hubert, 16 March 1904
- Kingdom of Greece:
  - Grand Cross of the Order of George I
  - Grand Cross of the Order of the Redeemer
- Kingdom of Italy:
  - Knight of the Supreme Order of the Most Holy Annunciation, 22 March 1900
  - Grand Cross of the Order of Saints Maurice and Lazarus, 22 March 1900
  - Grand Cross of the Order of the Crown of Italy, 22 March 1900
- Korean Empire: Grand Cordon of the Order of the Golden Ruler, 20 September 1900
- Netherlands: Grand Cross of the Order of the Netherlands Lion, 12 July 1900
- Norway: Grand Cross of the Order of St. Olav, with Collar, 26 September 1922
- Poland: Knight of the Order of the White Eagle
- Kingdom of Portugal: Grand Cross of the Sash of the Two Orders, April 1904
- Russian Empire: Knight of the Order of St. Andrew, 2 July 1900
- (Thailand) Siam: Knight of the Order of the Royal House of Chakri, 26 October 1899
- Spain: Knight of the Order of the Golden Fleece, 17 May 1896
- Sweden: Knight of the Order of the Seraphim, 20 September 1907
- United Kingdom: Stranger Knight Companion of the Order of the Garter, 18 September 1912

== See also ==
- Taishō era

Emperor Taishō Imperial House of Japan Born: 31 August 1879 Died: 25 December 1926
Regnal titles
Preceded by Emperor Meiji	Emperor of Japan; 30 July 1912 – 25 December 1926	Succeeded by Emperor Shōwa (Hirohito)
