= Atsuko Ikeda =

Former Japanese princess (born 1931)

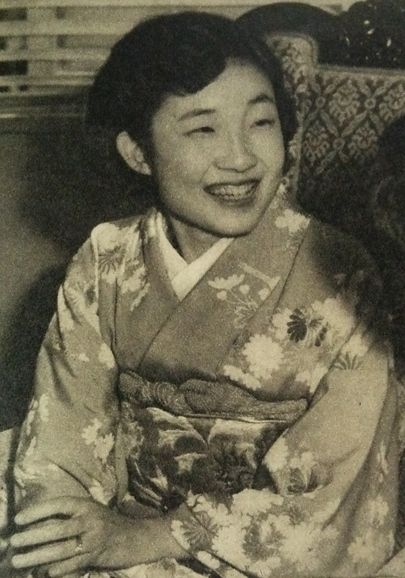
- Atsuko Ikeda, c. 1952
- Born: Atsuko, Princess Yori (順宮厚子内親王); 7 March 1931 (age 95); Tokyo Imperial Palace, Tokyo City, Empire of Japan
- Spouse: Takamasa Ikeda (m. 1952; died 2012)
- Children: Motohiro Ikeda (adopted)
- Parents: Emperor Shōwa (father); Princess Nagako Kuni (mother)
- Relatives: Imperial House of Japan; Ikeda clan

Atsuko Ikeda (池田 厚子, Ikeda Atsuko; born 7 March 1931), formerly Atsuko, Princess Yori (順宮厚子内親王, Yori-no-miya Atsuko Naishinnō), is the fourth daughter of Emperor Shōwa and Empress Kōjun. As such, she is the older sister of Emperor Emeritus Akihito and paternal aunt of Emperor Naruhito. She married Takamasa Ikeda, a man from outside the imperial dynasty, on 10 October 1952; as a result, she gave up her imperial title and left the Japanese imperial family, as required by law. Later, she served as the supreme priestess (saishu) of the Ise Grand Shrine between 1988 and 2017.

== Biography ==
Princess Atsuko was born at the Tokyo Imperial Palace on 7 March 1931; her father is the Emperor Showa (Hirohito), and her mother is the Empress Kōjun. Her childhood appellation was Yori-no-miya (順宮). She had three elder sisters, the Princess Shigeko Teru-no-miya, the Princess Sachiko Hisa-no-miya (died as a baby) and the Princess Kazuko Taka-no-miya. As with her elder two sisters, she was not raised by her biological parents, but by a succession of court ladies at a separate palace built for her and her elder sisters in the Marunouchi district of Tokyo. She graduated from the Gakushūin Peer's School, and was also tutored along with her siblings in English language by an American tutor, Elizabeth Gray Vining, during the Allied occupation of Japan following World War II. She graduated from Gakushuin University Women's College in March 1952.

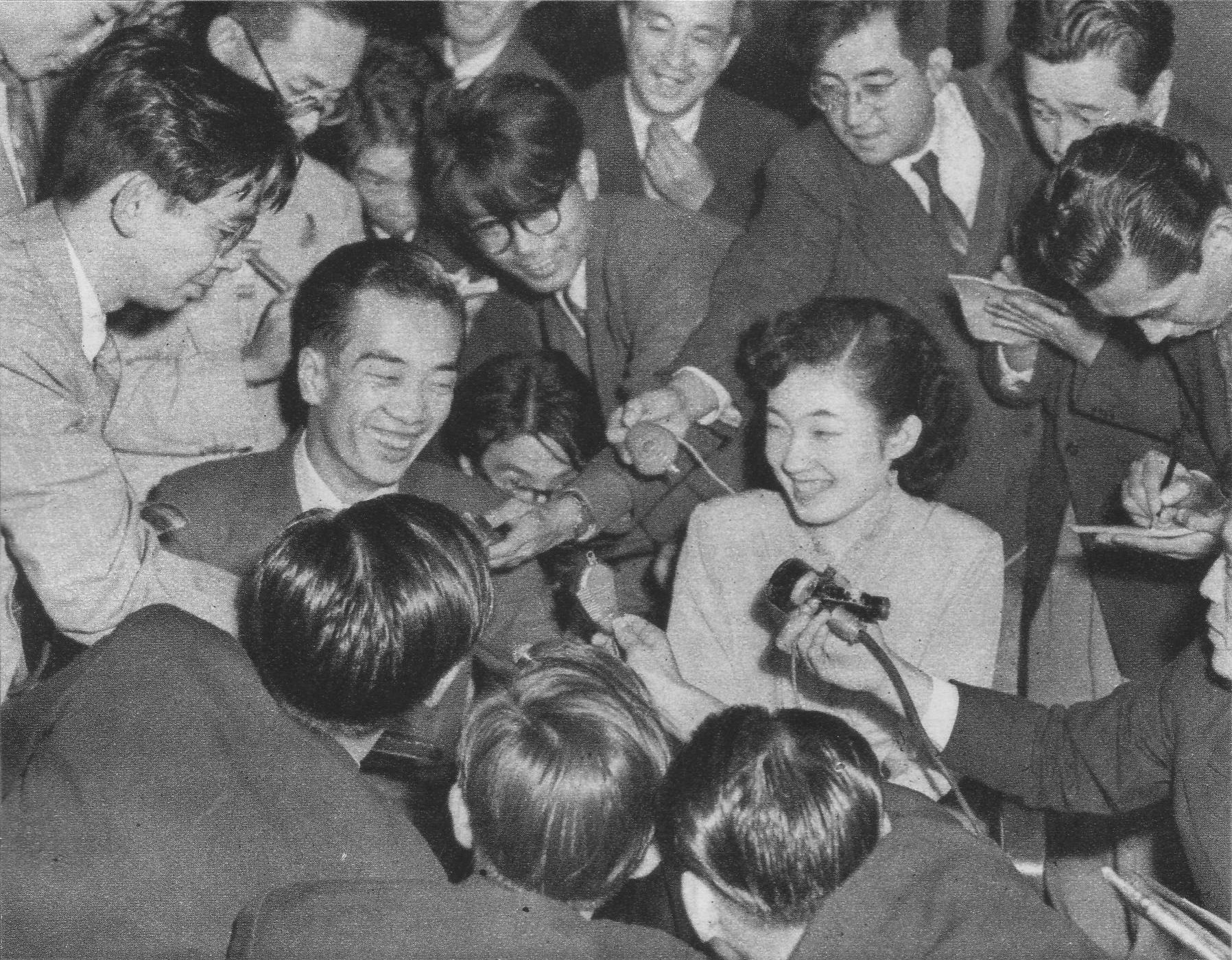
Atsuko and Takamasa Ikeda on 10 October 1952

On 10 October 1952, Princess Yori married Takamasa Ikeda (池田 隆政, Ikeda Takamasa; 21 October 1926 – 21 July 2012), the eldest son of former Marquis Nobumasa Ikeda and a direct descendant of the last daimyō of Okayama Domain, whom she had met at a Japanese tea ceremony at Kōraku-en gardens. The couple were engaged after only six months, but wedding plans had to be postponed due to the death of her grandmother Empress Teimei in 1951 and subsequent period of mourning. Upon her marriage, Princess Yori became the second daughter of an emperor to relinquish her status as a member of the Japanese imperial family and become a commoner upon marriage, in accordance with the 1947 Imperial Household Law. She also gave up an annual imperial allowance worth ¥650,000 ($1,800) at the time. The groom's father and the bride's mother, the Empress, were first cousins, making the couple second cousins.

In October 1988, Ikeda succeeded her ailing elder sister, Kazuko Takatsukasa, as the most sacred priestess (saishu) of the Ise Grand Shrine. She served in that capacity until 19 June 2017, whereupon she was succeeded by her niece, Sayako Kuroda. She serves as the honorary head (総裁, Sōsai) of the Association of Shinto Shrines. The former princess adopted Motohiro Nozu, who is CEO of Kabaya, in April 2024. About 10 years earlier she and her husband were already having talks about adopting someone to continue the Ikeda line. However, the adoption does not solve the Ikeda family's survival because Motohiro and his wife have no children. Motohiro and his wife also changed their last name to Ikeda.

== Honours ==
=== National honours ===
- Grand Cordon of the Order of the Precious Crown

== Ancestry ==
Ancestors of Atsuko Ikeda

16. Osahito, Emperor Kōmei
8. Mutsuhito, Emperor Meiji
17. Lady Yoshiko Nakayama
4. Yoshihito, Emperor Taishō
18. Count Takamitsu Yanagihara
9. Lady Naruko Yanagiwara
19. Lady Utano Hasegawa
2. Hirohito, Emperor Shōwa
20. Prince Kujō Hisatada, Regent of Japan
10. Prince Kujō Michitaka of the Fujiwara Clan
21. Lady Tsuneko Karahashi
5. Lady Sadako Kujō
22. Yorioki Noma
11. Lady Ikuko Noma
23. Lady Kairi Yamokushi
1. Atsuko, Princess Yori
24. Prince Fushimi Kuniie
12. Asahiko, 1st Imperial Prince Kuni
25. Lady Nobuko Toriikōji
6. Kuniyoshi, 2nd Imperial Prince Kuni
26. Sir Toshimasu Izumitei
13. Lady Makiko Izumi
27. Lady Mako Yatoshi
3. Princess Nagako of Kuni
28. Prince Shimazu Hisamitsu
14. Prince Shimazu Tadayoshi
29. Lady Chimoko Shimazu of Echizen-Shimazu
7. Princess Chikako Shimazu
15. Lady Sumako Yamazaki

== Gallery ==
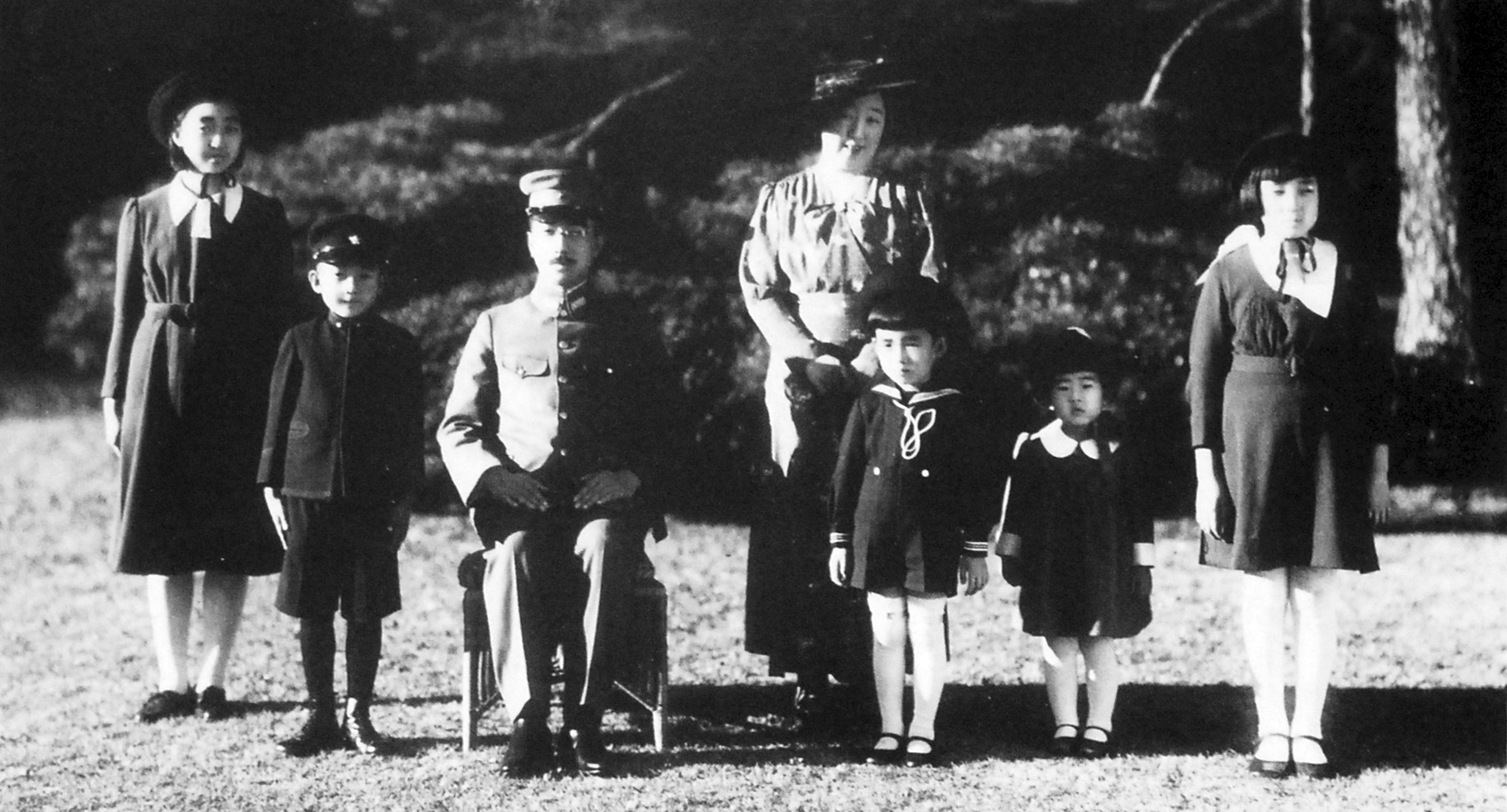
Emperor Showa's family in 1941

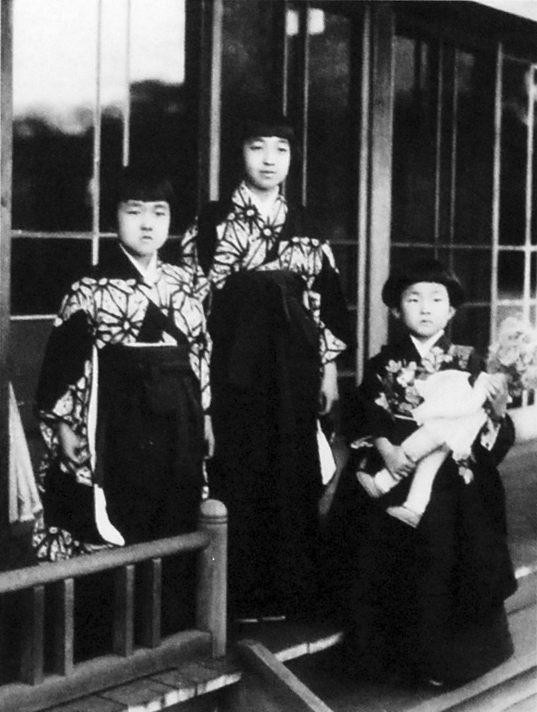
Emperor Shōwa's daughters

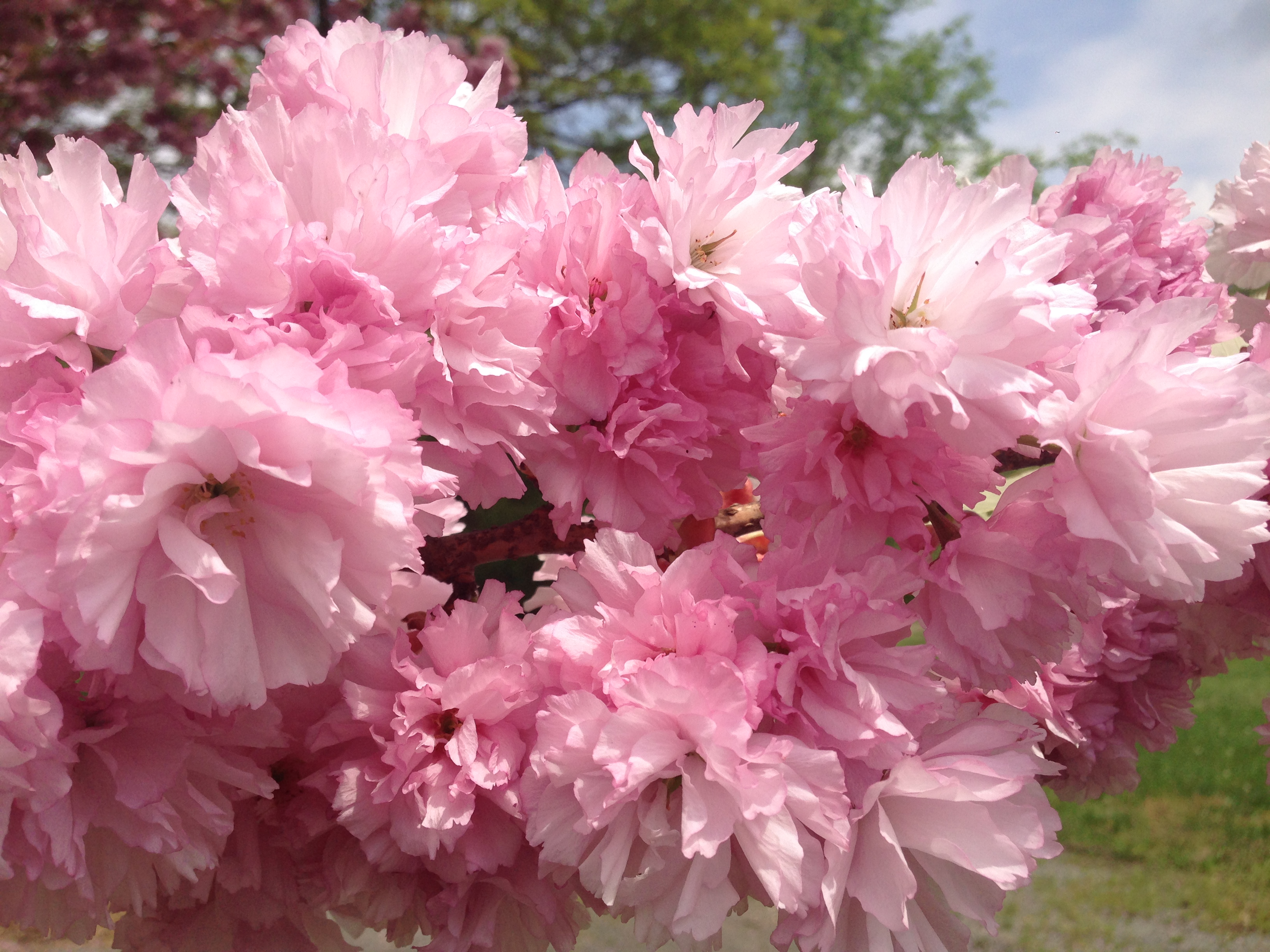
Japanese cherry blossoms, Prunus serrulata, designated imperial personal emblem of Atsuko

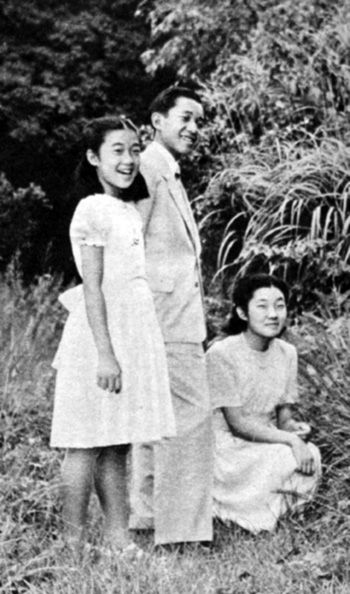
Princess Atsuko with her younger brother and sister, Prince Akihito and Princess Takako, in September 1950

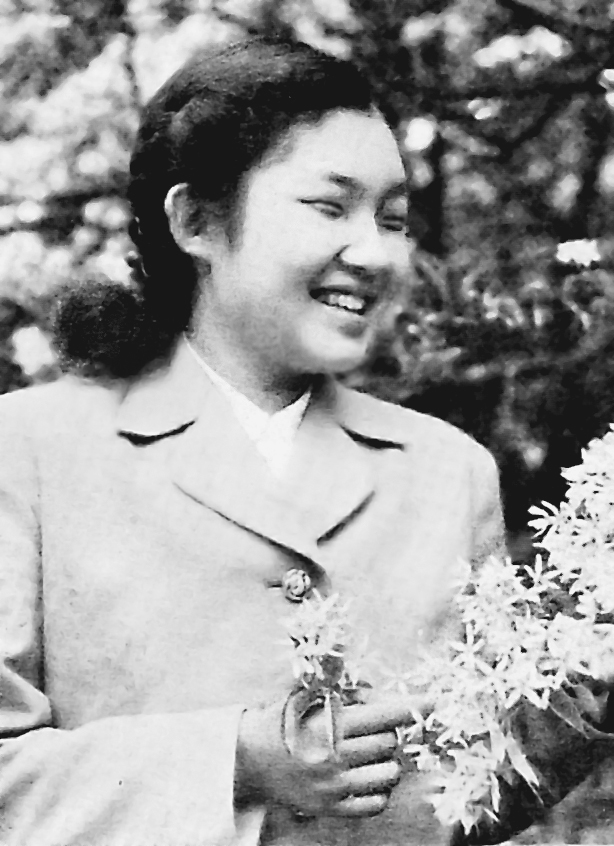
Princess Atsuko in 1951

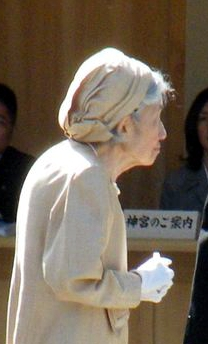
Atsuko Ikeda at the Ise Grand Shrine in Ise City, Mie Prefecture, in November 2009

== Sources ==
- Foreign Affairs Association of Japan, The Japan Year Book (Tokyo: Kenkyusha Press, 1939–40, 1941–42, 1944–45, 1945–46, 1947–48).
- Takie Sugiyama Lebra, Above the Clouds: Status Culture of the Modern Japanese Nobility (Berkeley: University of California Press, 1992).
- "Hirohito's Daughter Wed: Princess Yori Married to Tokyo Commoner by Shinto Rites," New York Times 10 October 1952.
- Bix, Herbert P. (2001). Hirohito and the Making of Modern Japan. Harper Perennial. ISBN 0-06-093130-2.
