= Musashi Imperial Graveyard =

Japanese Imperial graveyard in Tokyo

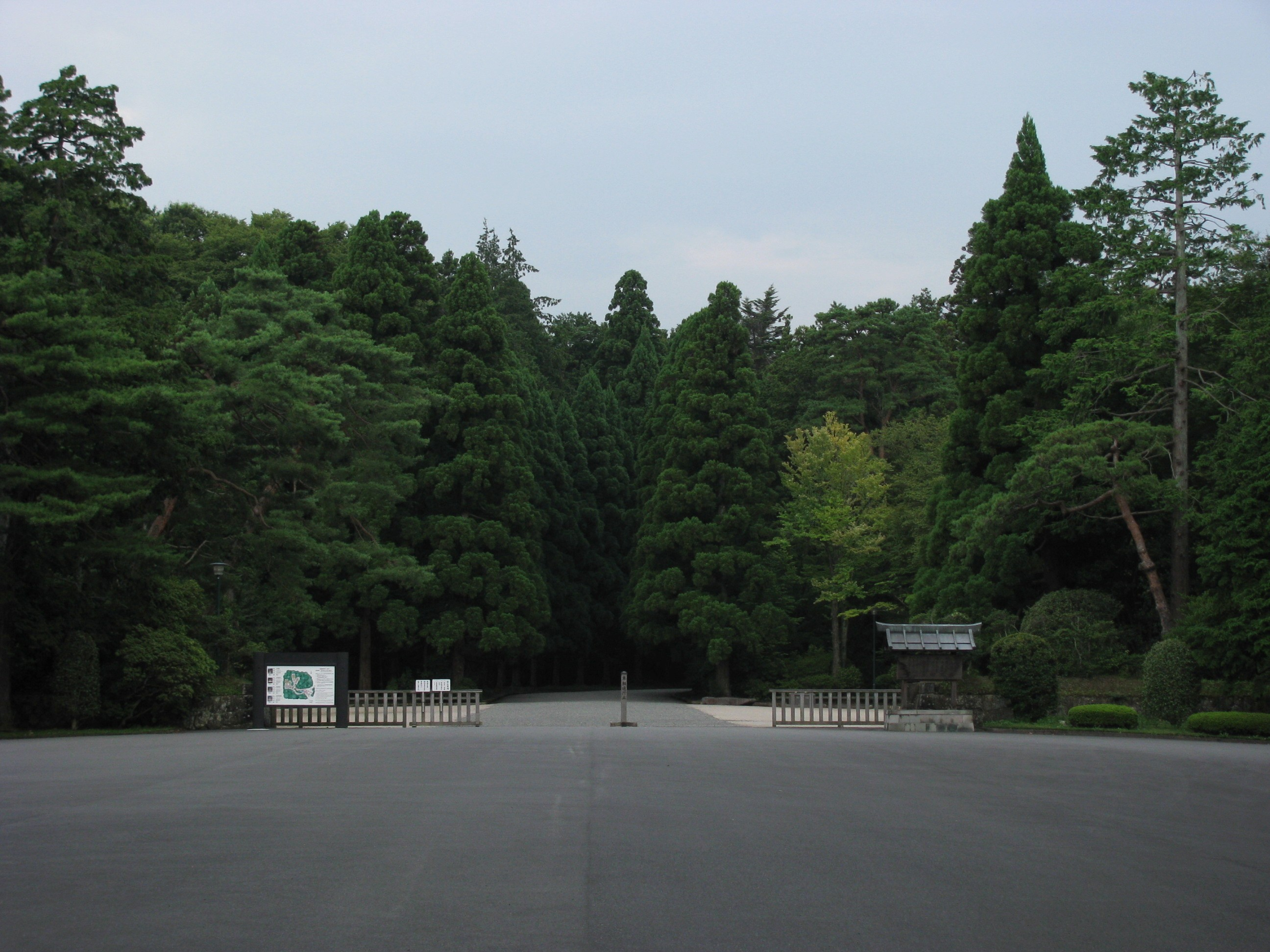
- Entrance of the Musashi Imperial Graveyard, Hachiōji, Tokyo
- Interactive map of Musashi Imperial Graveyard

Details
- Established: 1926
- Location: Hachiōji, Tokyo
- Country: Japan
- Coordinates: 35°39′0.85″N 139°16′48.16″E
- Owned by: Archives and Mausolea Department, Imperial Household Agency

Musashi Imperial Graveyard (武蔵陵墓地, Musashi ryōbochi) is a mausoleum complex of the Japanese Emperors in Nagabusa-machi, Hachiōji, Tokyo, Japan. Located within a forest in the western suburbs of Tokyo and named for the ancient Musashi Province, the site contains the mausolea of Emperor Taishō and Emperor Shōwa, as well as those of their wives, Empress Teimei and Empress Kōjun.

== History ==
Emperor Taishō was the first Emperor of Japan to be buried in Tokyo. He has been called the first "Tokyo Emperor" because he was the first to live his entire life in or near Tokyo. His father, Emperor Meiji, was born and reared in Kyoto; and although he later lived and died in Tokyo, his mausoleum is located on the outskirts of Kyoto, near the tombs of his Imperial forebears.

It is under the administration of the Archives and Mausolea Department.

== Design ==
The imperial graveyard in Hachiōji is designed as a semi-natural planted space which mainly consists of woodland, rocks and trees. In addition to the stone-topped Imperial mausolea, it also contains smaller monuments and religious structures, like Torii.

The approach to the Musashi Imperial Graveyard from the Kōshū Kaidō is lined with zelkova and the mausolea planted with cryptomeria.

== Tombs ==
Name	Year of death	Mausoleum name	Image	Coordinates
Emperor Taishō (Yoshihito)	1926	Tama no Misasagi (多摩陵)		35°39′1.5″N 139°16′48″E
Empress Teimei (Sadako)	1951	Tama no Higashi no Misasagi (多摩東陵)		35°39′00.5″N 139°16′50.82″E
Emperor Shōwa (Hirohito)	1989	Musashino no Misasagi (武藏野陵)		35°39′4.71″N 139°16′53.28″E
Empress Kōjun (Nagako)	2000	Musashino no Higashi no Misasagi (武藏野東陵)		35°39′2.93″N 139°16′57″E

== Future ==
In 2012 and 2013, the Imperial Household Agency confirmed press reports that Emperor Akihito and Empress Michiko do not plan to be buried like their immediate predecessors, but to be cremated, for which cremation facilities will be added to the Musashi Imperial Graveyard. Their ashes will then be interred in individual mausoleums, to be built side by side in an integrated fashion, on the west side of the tomb of Emperor Taishō. This adaptation of the imperial funeral rites will mark a historic change from some 350 years in which in-ground burials were the norm for monarchs and their spouses. The Imperial Household Agency plans that the two new mausoleums will have an area of some 3,500 square metres, about 80 percent of the 4,300 square metres of the tomb of the Emperor's parents, Emperor Shōwa and Empress Kōjun.

== See also ==
- Death and state funeral of Hirohito
- Musashi Province
- Meiji no Mori Takao Quasi-National Park
- Takao Station (Tokyo)
- Japanese Imperial Tombs
- Mausoleums of Emperors of Japan
  - Fushimi Momoyama no Misasagi in Kyoto, Kyoto Prefecture, Japan.
