= Takako Shimazu =

Former Japanese princess (born 1939)

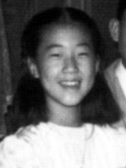
- Takako in 1950
- Born: Takako, Princess Suga (清宮貴子内親王); 2 March 1939 (age 87); Tokyo Imperial Palace, Tokyo City, Empire of Japan
- Spouse: Hisanaga Shimazu (m. 1960)
- Children: Yoshihisa Shimazu
- Parents: Emperor Shōwa (father); Princess Nagako Kuni (mother)
- Relatives: Imperial House of Japan

Takako Shimazu (島津 貴子, Shimazu Takako; born 2 March 1939), born Takako, Princess Suga (清宮貴子内親王, Suga-no-miya Takako Naishinnō), is a former member of the Imperial House of Japan. She is the fifth and youngest daughter of Emperor Shōwa and Empress Kōjun, the youngest sister of the Emperor Emeritus of Japan, Akihito, and the paternal aunt of the current Emperor of Japan, Naruhito. She married Hisanaga Shimazu on 3 March 1960. As a result, she gave up her imperial title and left the Japanese imperial family, as required by law.

== Biography ==
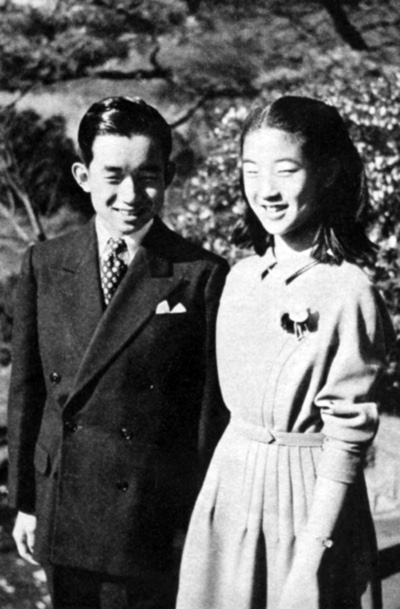
Prince Masahito and Princess Takako in 1952

Princess Takako was born at the Tokyo Imperial Palace. Her childhood appellation was Suga-no-miya (清宮).

As with her elder sisters, she was not raised by her biological parents, but by a succession of court ladies at a separate palace built for her and her sisters in the Marunouchi district of Tokyo. She found life within the palace extremely restrictive, but did not oppose the rules, stating "I used to think what's the use of making a fuss, since I can't change things any way". Among the crafts she learned were flower arranging and the tea ceremony. She graduated from the Gakushuin Peers School, and was also tutored along with her siblings in the English language by an American tutor, Elizabeth Gray Vining during the Allied occupation of Japan following World War II. Princess Takako graduated from Gakushuin University Women's College with a degree in English literature in March 1957.

On 10 March 1960, Princess Takako wed Hisanaga Shimazu (born 29 March 1934, Tokyo), the son of the late Count Hisanori Shimazu and (at the time) an analyst at the Japan Export-Import Bank (JEXIM). They married in a Tokyo restaurant in a ceremony attended by her parents and brother, Emperor Hirohito, Empress Nagako, and Akihito. The couple were introduced by common acquaintances at the Gakushuin where Hisanaga was a classmate of Crown Prince Akihito. The marriage was an arranged one, to which Takako agreed on the condition that if they decided they were incompatible during their courtship they would call off the wedding. As to why she put forward the condition she said, "In my case, a non-arranged marriage was practically impossible. But I didn't want to repeat the kind of marriage all my older sisters had had to go through—'how do you do' in the morning and everything decided by the afternoon".

Upon her marriage, the Princess relinquished her membership in the Imperial Family and adopted her husband's surname, in accordance with the 1947 Imperial Household Law, in a rule that has since been repealed as of 2026. Described by Western media sources at the time as a "commoner bank clerk," the groom was actually a grandson of the last daimyō of Satsuma Domain, Shimazu Tadayoshi, and thus a maternal first cousin to Empress Nagako, making the bride and groom first cousins once removed. Takako and her husband had one son, Yoshihisa Shimazu, who was born on 5 April 1962.

In 1963, three years after her marriage, she narrowly escaped from an attempted kidnapping. Due to extensive media coverage, the location of the couple's home was common knowledge, as was her $500,000 marriage dowry (in Japan, the bride is given a sum of money for her marriage). A member of the criminal group tipped off the police before the kidnapping could occur.

Hisanaga Shimazu pursued a thirty-year career with JEXIM, including postings to Washington, D.C. in the United States and Sydney, Australia accompanied by Takako who mostly functioned as a housewife during their stays abroad. He became a member of the board of directors of the Sony Corporation upon his retirement from the bank in 1987, served as executive director of the Sony Foundation for Science Education from 1994 to 2001, and is currently research director of the Yamashina Institute for Ornithology.

The former princess has made numerous appearances on Japanese television as a commentator on world events and as a guest on radio disk jockey programs. In 1970 she began working as a consultant in the Seibu Pisa store in the Prince Hotels and later served on the board of directors of the Prince Hotels chain. She is the first member of the Japanese imperial family to hold a commercial job.

== Honours ==
=== National honours ===
- Grand Cordon of the Order of the Precious Crown

== Ancestry ==
Ancestors of Takako Shimazu

8. Mutsuhito, Emperor Meiji
4. Yoshihito, Emperor Taishō
9. Lady Naruko Yanagiwara
2. Hirohito, Emperor Shōwa
10. Prince Kujō Michitaka of the Fujiwara Clan
5. Lady Sadako Kujō
11. Lady Ikuko Noma
1. Takako, Princess Suga
12. Asahiko, 1st Imperial Prince Kuni
6. Kuniyoshi, 2nd Imperial Prince Kuni
13. Lady Makiko Izumi
3. Princess Nagako of Kuni
14. Prince Shimazu Tadayoshi
7. Princess Chikako Shimazu
15. Lady Sumako Yamazaki

== Gallery ==
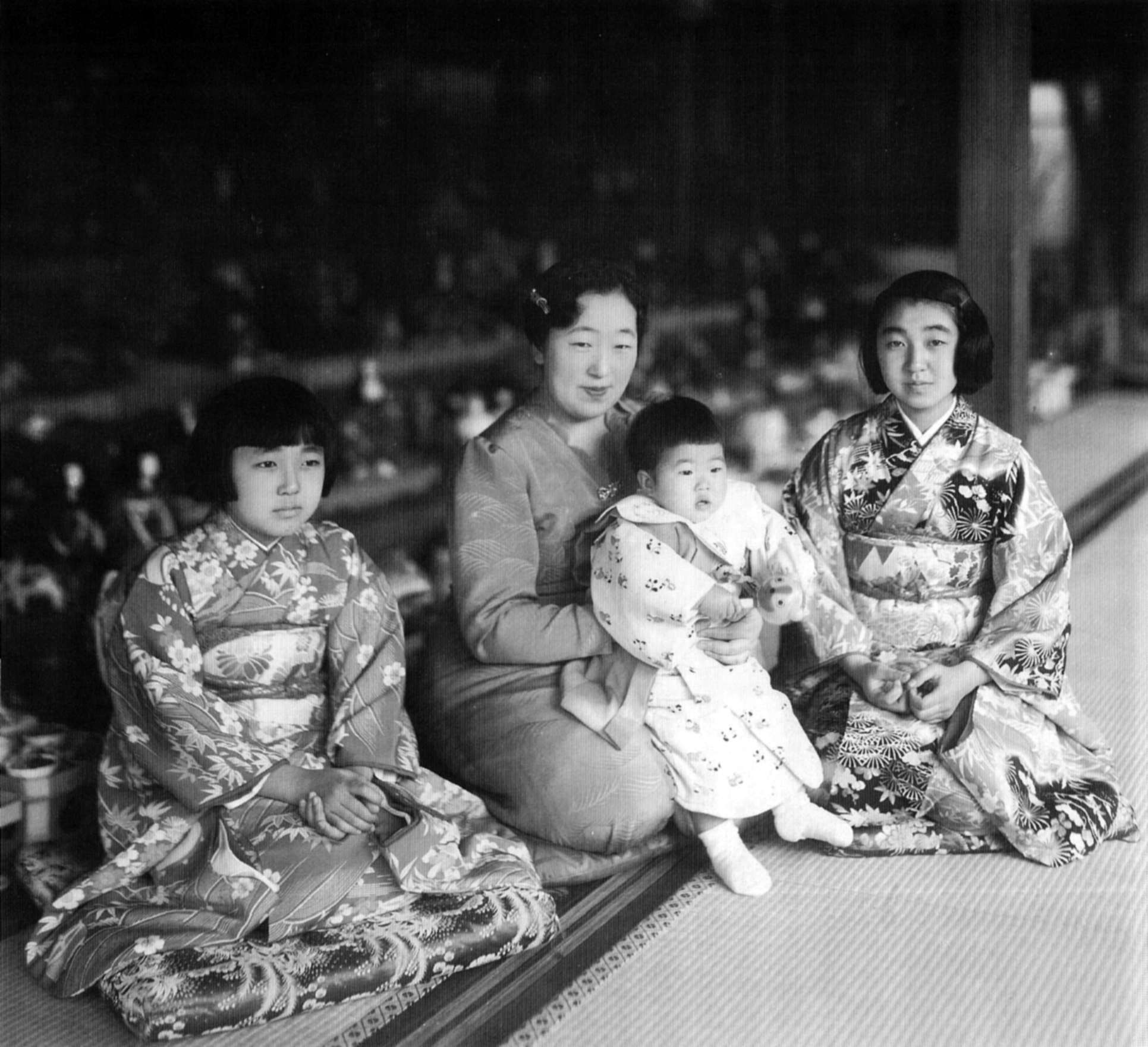
Princess Takako being held by her mother, Empress Nagako during the festivities for the Girls' Day, c. 1940

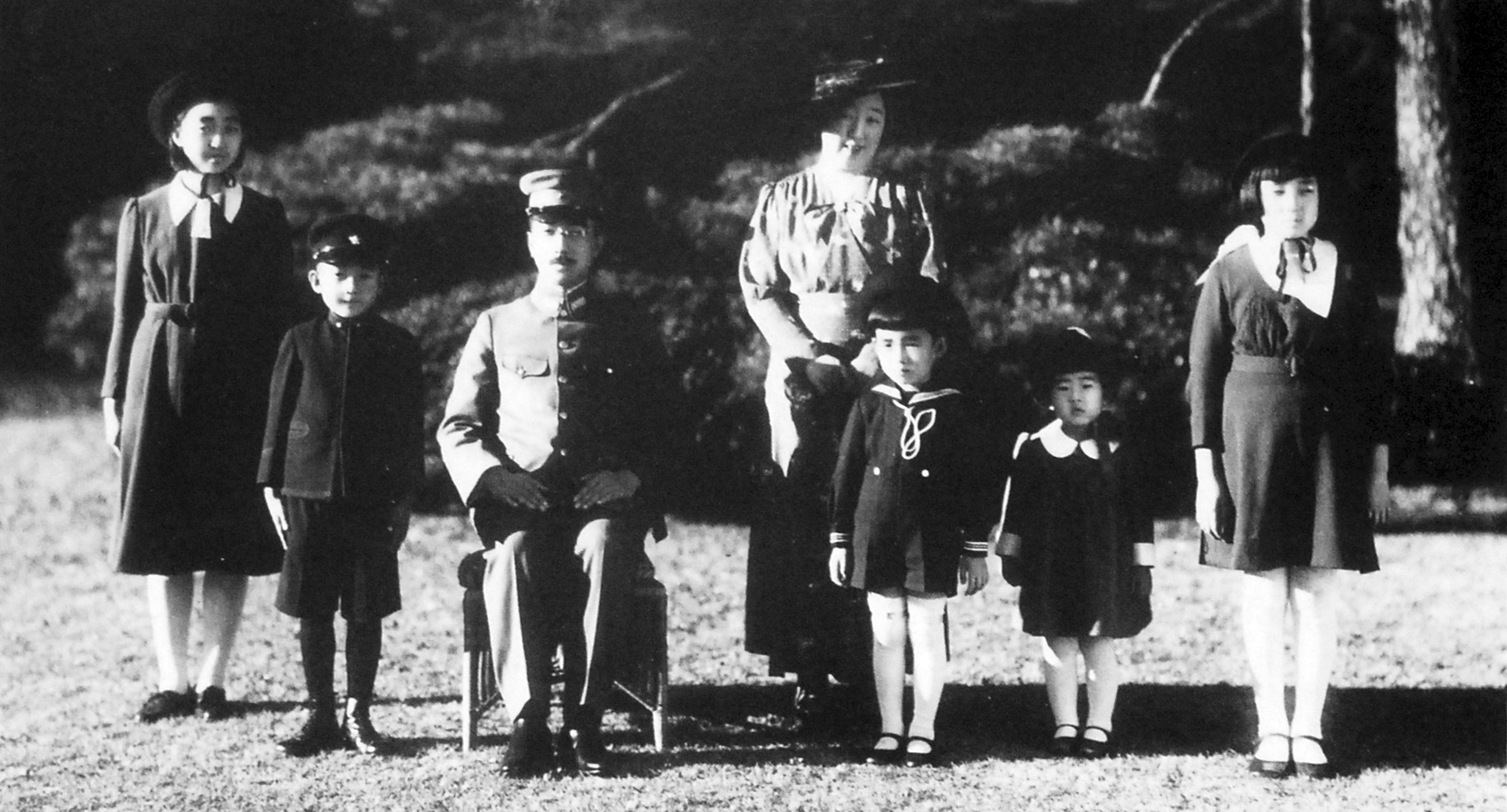
Princess Takako (second from the right) with her parents and siblings on 7 December 1941 (the day before the attack on Pearl Harbor)

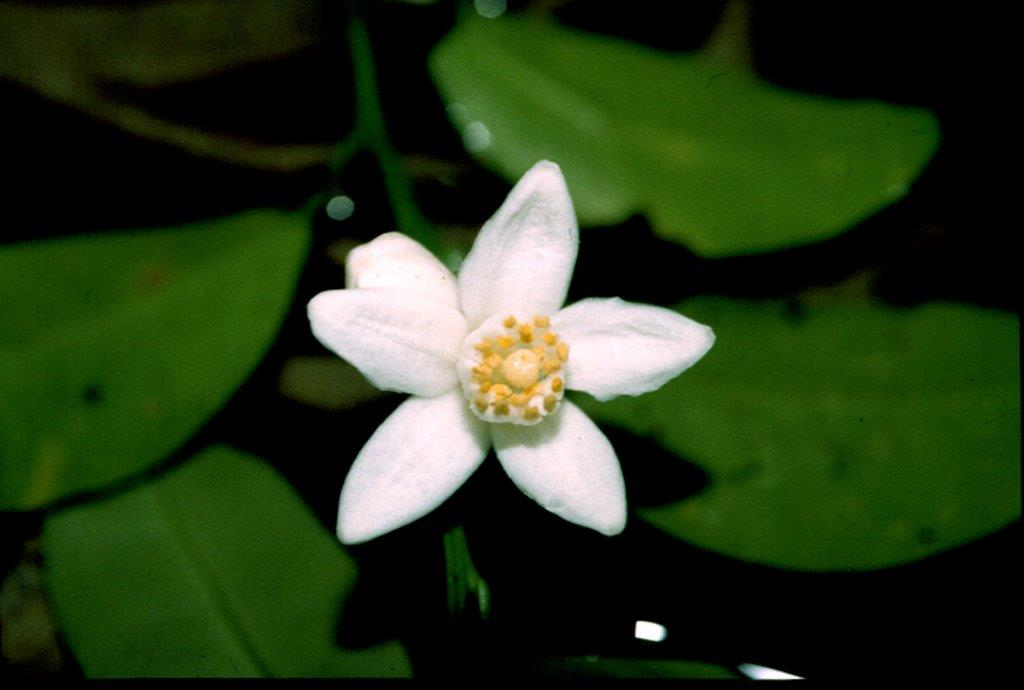
Tachibana orange flowers, Citrus tachibana, designated imperial personal emblem of Takako

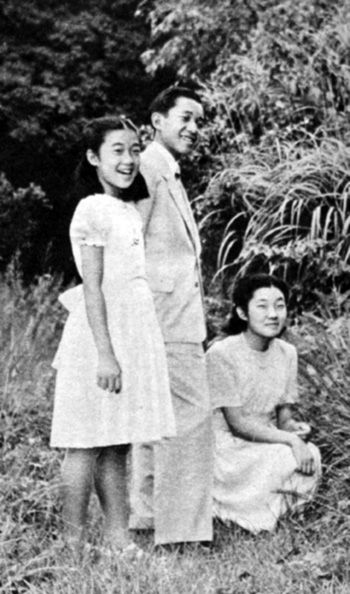
Princess Takako with her brother and sister, Prince Akihito and Princess Atsuko, in September 1950

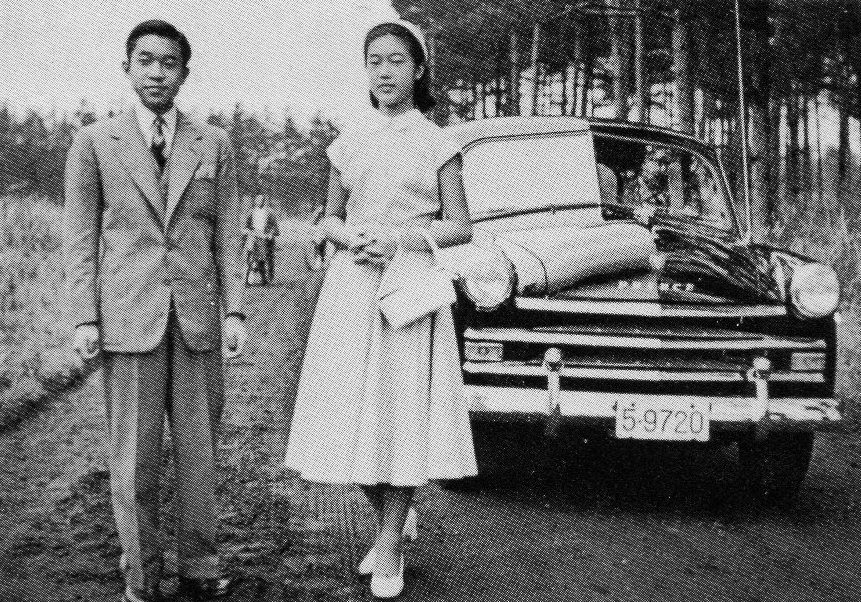
Princess Takako with her older brother Crown Prince Akihito in front of his Prince Sedan in 1954
