= Hayama Imperial Villa =

Residence of the Japanese Imperial Family

Coordinates: 35°15′40″N 139°34′41″E

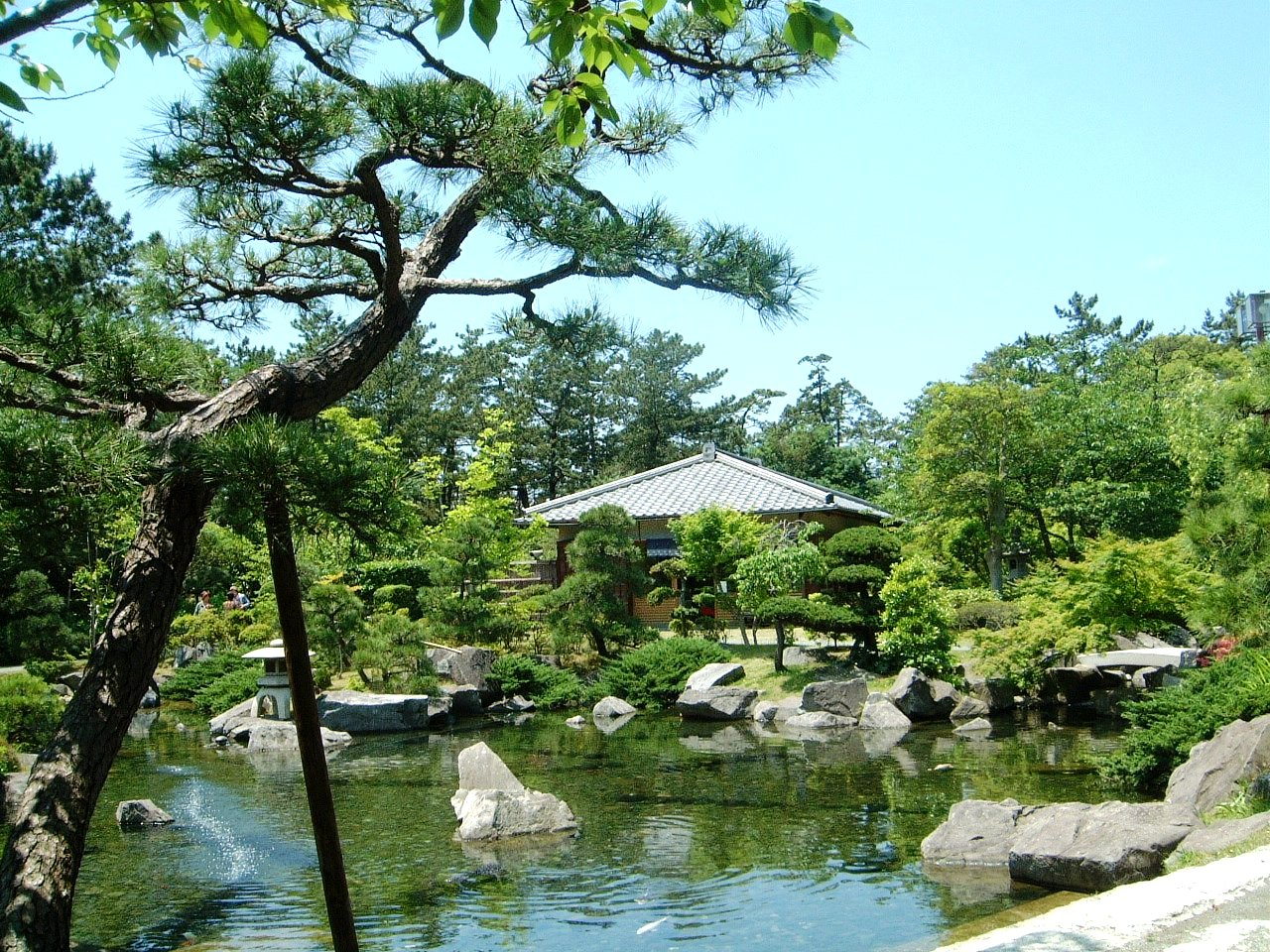
Hayama Shiosai Park, formerly part of the gardens of Hayama Imperial Villa

Hayama Imperial Villa (葉山御用邸, Hayama Goyōtei), located in the town of Hayama, Kanagawa Prefecture, Japan is a residence owned by the Japanese Imperial Family, and used on infrequent intervals as an informal winter retreat.

== History ==
The Imperial Family of Japan previously had residences in several locations within Kanagawa Prefecture:

- Odawara Imperial Villa (小田原御用邸, Odawara Goyōtei), located in the city of Odawara was built in 1901 by Emperor Meiji, on the site of Odawara Castle. It was abolished in 1930, and the site was given back to the city for the reconstruction of the castle.
- Kamakura Imperial Villa (鎌倉御用邸, Kamakura Goyōtei), located in Kamakura was built by Emperor Meiji in 1899 as a summer residence for his 8th daughter, Princess Fumi-no-miya Nobuko (later married to Prince Asaka Yasuhiko) and 9th daughter, Princess Yasunomiya Toshiko (later married to Prince Higashikuni Naruhiko). It was destroyed in the 1923 Great Kantō earthquake, and the site was turned over to the Kamakura city government in 1931, and is now the location of a school.
- Miyanoshita Imperial Villa (宮の下御用邸, Miyanoshita Goyōtei), located in Hakone was built by Emperor Meiji in 1895, and was a favorite residence of Prince Takamatsu Nobuhito, the younger brother of Emperor Hirohito. It is now an annex of the Hakone Fujiya Hotel.

The Hayama Imperial Villa was acquired by the Imperial Household Agency in 1894. It is located on the east bank of Sagami Bay in central Miura Peninsula, just south of Kamakura. The villa was a favorite of Emperor Taishō and he often visited to convalesce from his illnesses and to escape from the stresses of his official duties in Tokyo. Emperor Taishō died at the Hayama Imperial Villa in December 1926. The villa was subsequently used by Emperor Shōwa, who also built a marine biology laboratory on its grounds. Research from the laboratory has resulted in a number of technical monographs. The Imperial Family traditionally uses the Hayama residence in February–March, the season when few tourists visit the area.

The villa was burned down in 1971 in an act of arson and was rebuilt as a one-story building of western architectural design. A portion of the grounds was donated to the town of Hayama at that time, and is now the Hayama Shiosai Park, with a traditional Japanese garden and teahouse, and a small museum displaying part of Emperor Hirohito's collection of marine specimens from Sagami Bay.
