= Hayama =

Hayama 葉山町
- Town
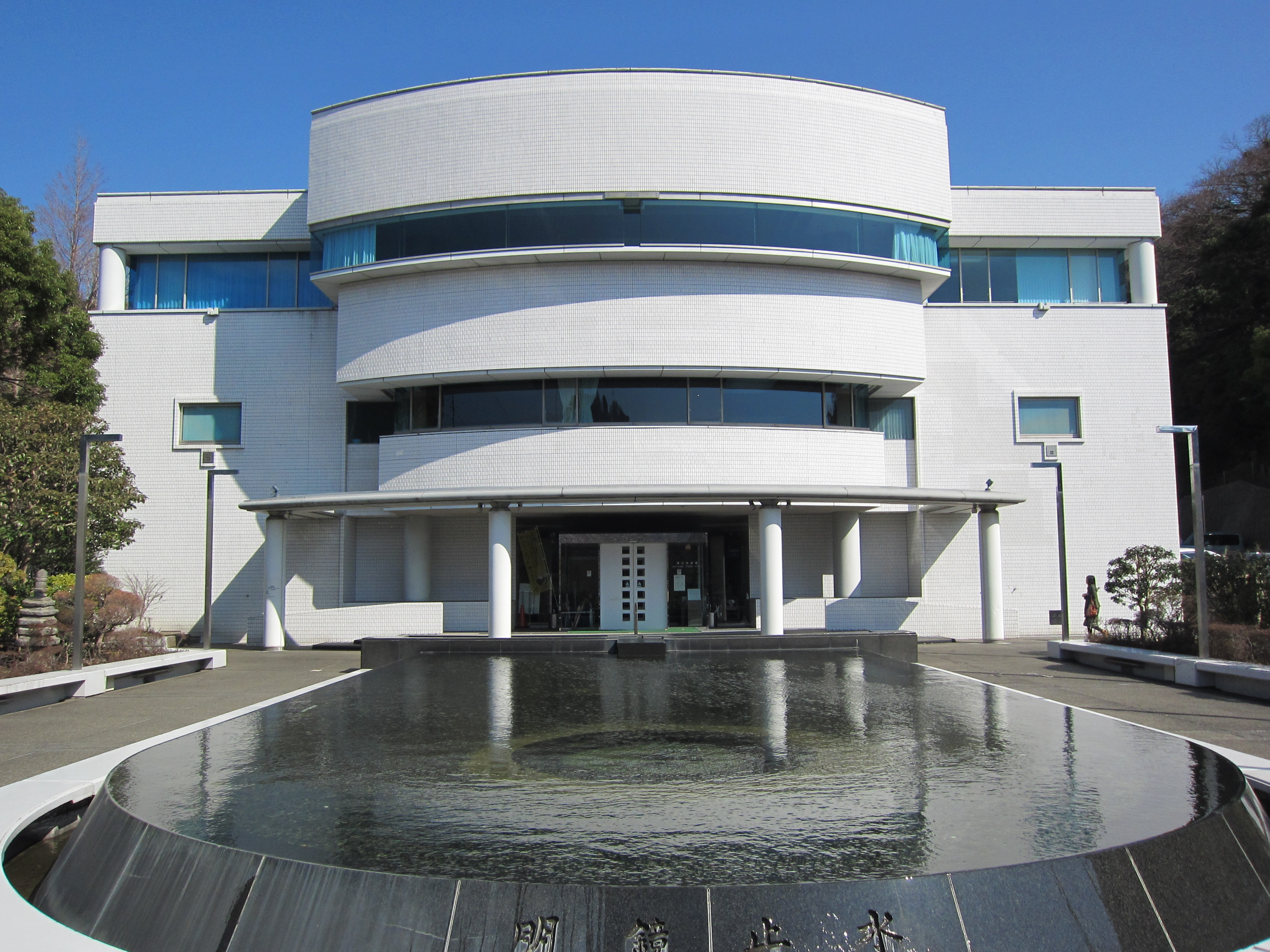
- Hayama Town Hall

- Flag Seal

- Location of Hayama in Kanagawa Prefecture

- Coordinates: 35°16′21″N 139°35′10″E
- Country: Japan
- Region: Kantō
- Prefecture: Kanagawa
- District: Miura

Area
  - Total: 17.06 km^{2} (6.59 sq mi)

Population (April 1, 2021)
  - Total: 32,961
  - Density: 1,932/km^{2} (5,004/sq mi)
- Time zone: UTC+9 (Japan Standard Time)
- Symbols
  - Tree: Japanese black pine
  - Flower: Rhododendron
  - Bird: Japanese bush-warbler
- Phone number: 046-876-1111
- Address: 2135 Horinouchi, Hayama-machi, Miura-gun, Kanagawa-ken; 240-0192
- Website: Official website

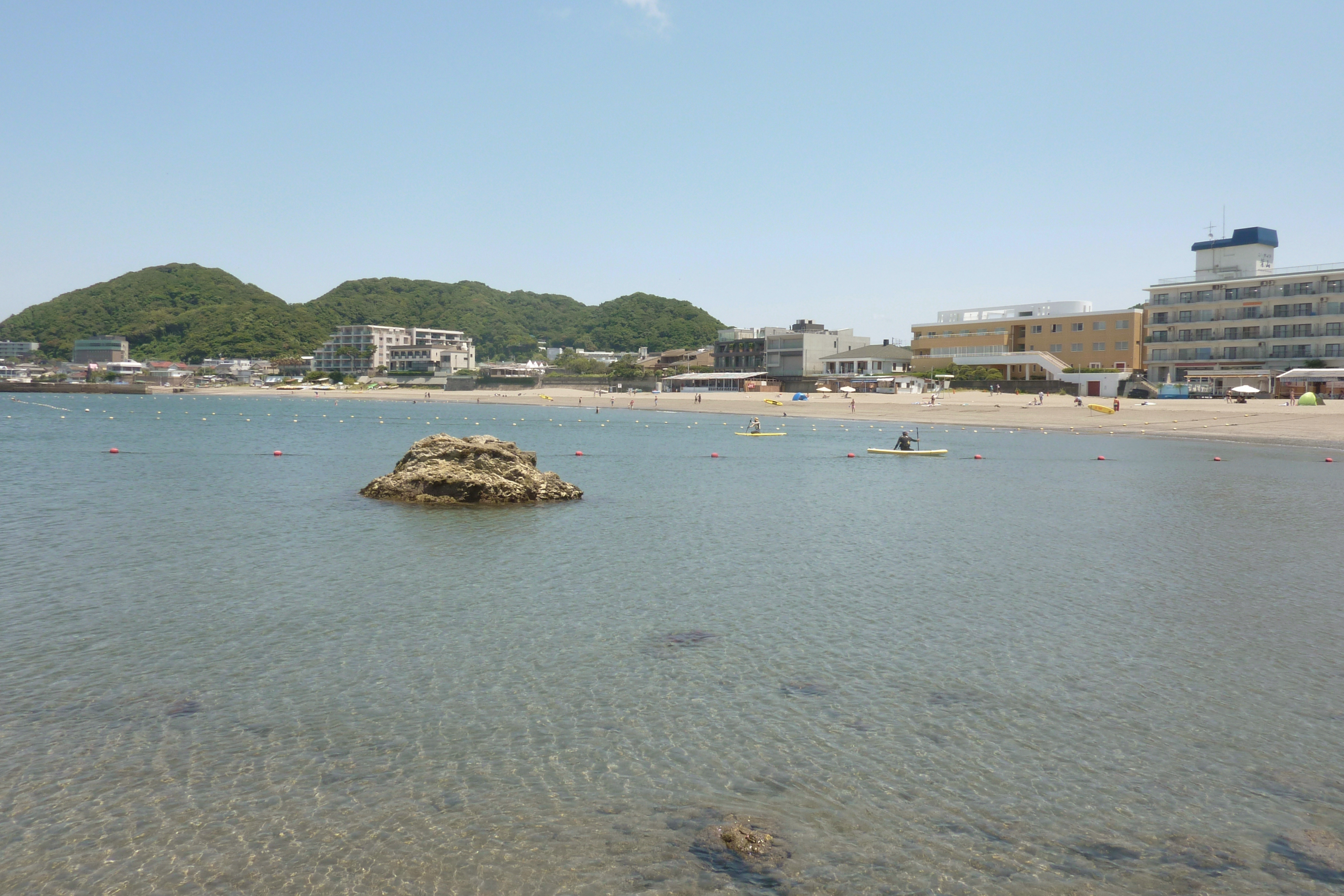
Morito Beach

Hayama (葉山町, Hayama-machi) is a town located in Kanagawa Prefecture, on central Honshū, Japan. As of 1 April 2021, the town had an estimated population of 32,961 and a population density of 1900 persons per km^{2}. The total area of the town is 17.06 square kilometres (6.59 sq mi). Since 1894, the Japanese Imperial Family has maintained a residence in Hayama, the seaside Hayama Imperial Villa.

== Geography ==
Hayama is located at the northern end of Miura Peninsula, facing Sagami Bay on the Pacific Ocean. Geographically, it is often cited as the easternmost point of the Shōnan region.

=== Surrounding municipalities ===
Kanagawa Prefecture

- Yokosuka
- Zushi

=== Climate ===
Hayama has a humid subtropical climate (Köppen Cfa) characterized by warm summers and cool winters with light to no snowfall. The average annual temperature in Hayama is 15.8 °C. The average annual rainfall is 1872 mm with September as the wettest month. The temperatures are highest on average in August, at around 24.6 °C, and lowest in January, at around 6.4 °C.

== Demographics ==
Per Japanese census data, the population of Hayama has recently plateaued after a long period of growth.

Historical population
Year	Pop.	±%
1920	7,558	—
1930	9,116	+20.6%
1940	9,986	+9.5%
1950	15,484	+55.1%
1960	15,762	+1.8%
1970	19,609	+24.4%
1980	28,359	+44.6%
1990	29,536	+4.2%
2000	30,413	+3.0%
2010	32,766	+7.7%
2020	31,665	−3.4%

== History ==
During the Edo period, all of eastern Sagami Province was tenryō territory under direct control of the Tokugawa shogunate, and administered by various hatamoto. With the establishment of the modern municipalities system the early Meiji period in April 1889, the area was reorganized into Hayama village through the merger of six hamlets. Hayama was elevated to town status in 1925.

== Government ==
Hayama has a mayor-council form of government with a directly elected mayor and a unicameral town council of 14 members. Hayama, together with neighboring Zushi, contributes one member to the Kanagawa Prefectural Assembly. In terms of national politics, the town is part of Kanagawa 4th district of the lower house of the Diet of Japan.

== Economy ==
Despite its lack of rail connections, Hayama is now primarily a commuter town for Tokyo and Yokohama and, due to its mild climate, a popular resort area with a marina. From the Meiji period it became a prestigious summer home location for the upper classes of Tokyo, partly due to the prestige of the Imperial villa. In the postwar period, its popularity continued with actors, artists and wealthy expatriates. Local agricultural produce includes shiitake mushrooms, and a brand of beef known as "Hayama-gyu".

== Education ==
Hayama has four public elementary schools and two public middle schools operated by the town government. In addition, the Graduate University for Advanced Studies's main administrative campus is hosted here.

== Transportation ==
=== Railway ===
Hayama has no passenger rail service. The nearest train station is the Yokosuka Line Zushi Station or Keikyū Zushi Line Zushi·Hayama Station in neighboring Zushi.

=== Bus ===
Hayama has a bus service from Zushi provided by Keikyu.

=== YCAT ===
Hayama is also served by highway buses via YCAT to Yokohama.

=== Local Taxi Service ===
Taxi service also available from Zushi station.

=== Highway ===
- National Route 134

== Sister cities ==
- (Japan) Kusatsu, Gunma, since March 1969
- City of Holdfast Bay, Australia, since 1997; November 18, 2009, Holdfast Bay wrote a letter signed by their Deputy Mayor admonishing Hayama for Japan's whaling in the Southern Ocean.

== Local attractions ==
- Museum of Modern Art, Kamakura & Hayama
- Hayama Marina
- Hayama Port - a small fishing and recreational harbor.
- Hayama Shiosai Park
- Hayama Park - (葉山公園) a seaside park in Hayama, Kanagawa Prefecture, formerly part of the grounds of the Hayama Imperial Villa. It offers scenic views of Sagami Bay and retains coastal pine forests and open lawns for recreation.
- Yamaguchi Hoshun Memorial Museum - Yamaguchi Hōshun (山口蓬春, 15 October 1893 – 31 May 1971) was a Japanese nihonga painter known for blending traditional Japanese techniques with Western styles.
- Fudodo and Fudo Falls
- Chōjagasaki - a scenic coastal cape on the west coast of the Miura Peninsula near Hayama in Kanagawa Prefecture, known for its views of Sagami Bay, Enoshima, the Izu Peninsula, and Mount Fuji.
- Najima
- Morito Shrine - (森戸大明神) a historic Shinto shrine in Hayama. According to tradition, it was founded in the 12th century when Minamoto no Yoritomo brought a spirit from Mishima Taisha to this location. It remains a popular place of worship and offers scenic views of Sagami Bay.
- Moriyama Shrine - (森山社) a historic Shinto shrine in Hayama, enshrining Kushinadahime no Mikoto, and traditionally founded in the Nara period. Several festivals and markets are held here during warmer months of the year.
- Shopping Plaza HAYAMA STATION - (ショッピングプラザ ハヤマ ステーション) is a shopping and specialty goods plaza in Hayama, Kanagawa Prefecture, featuring local produce, foods, souvenirs, and small retailers. Located close to the highway, this plaza serves both locals and visitors with a variety of shops and dining options.
- Hayama Sangaoka Green Space - (県立はやま三ヶ岡山緑地) a green, forested park on the Miura Peninsula in Hayama, with hiking trails connecting a series of peaks and scenic views over Sagami Bay and, in clear weather, Mount Fuji.
- Nagare Sakurayama Kofun Cluster - (長柄桜山古墳群 a group of two large keyhole-shaped burial mounds dating from the Kofun period (4th century AD), located on a hill on the border of Zushi and Hayama. The site was discovered in 1999 and has been protected as a designated National Historic Site of Japan since 2002.

== Notable people from Hayama, Kanagawa ==
- Yasuko Kosuge (born 1974), Japanese former windsurfer
- miwa (born 1990), Japanese singer-songwriter and actress
- Sekai (born 1991), singer, dancer and J-pop idol, leader and member of J-pop boygroup Fantastics from Exile Tribe (Real Name: Sekai Yamamoto, Nihongo: 山本 世界, Yamamoto Sekai)
- Prince Tomohito of Mikasa (1946–2012), member of the Imperial House of Japan and the eldest son of Takahito, Prince Mikasa and Yuriko, Princess Mikasa
