= Kabaya =

Japanese confectionery company

Kabaya Foods Corporation

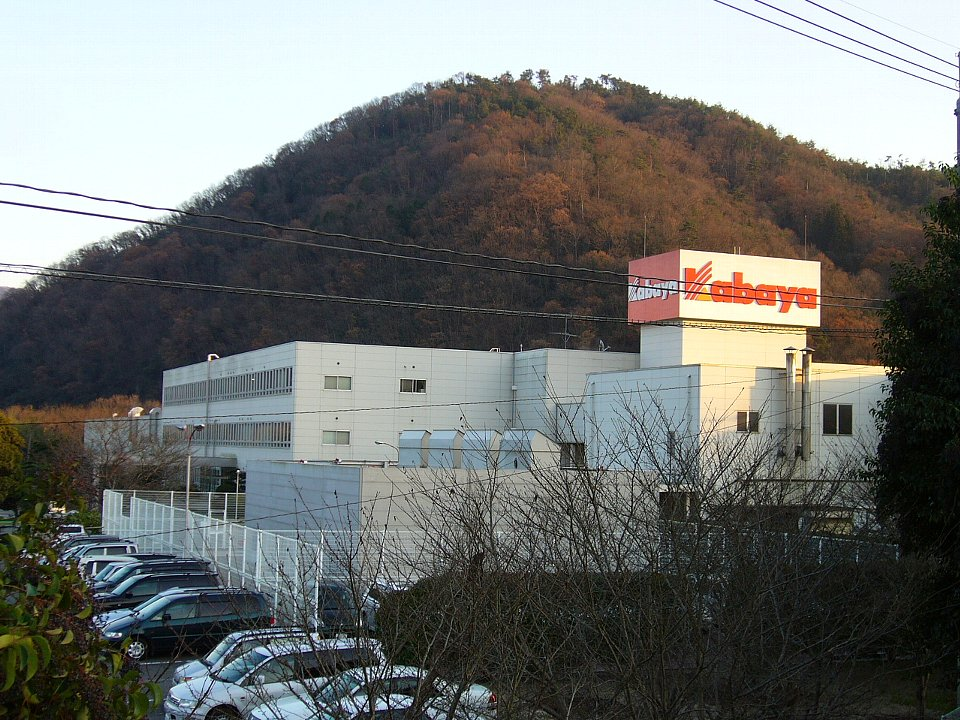
- Kabaya headquarters
- Native name: カバヤ食品株式会社
- Company type: Subsidiary
- Industry: Food
- Founded: December 24, 1946; 79 years ago
- Headquarters: Kita-ku, Okayama, Okayama Prefecture 107-8401, Japan
- Area served: Worldwide
- Key people: Motohiro Nozu (CEO)
- Products: Chocolates; Candies; Biscuits; Candy with toys; Gummies; Soda candies
- Owner: Nippon Kabaya Ohayo Holdings Inc.
- Number of employees: 856 (as of December 2016)
- Website: Official website

Kabaya Foods Corporation (カバヤ食品, Kabaya Shokuhin Kabushiki-gaisha) is a Japanese confectionery company founded in 1946.
