= Empress Nagako =

Empress of Japan from 1926 to 1989

Nagako
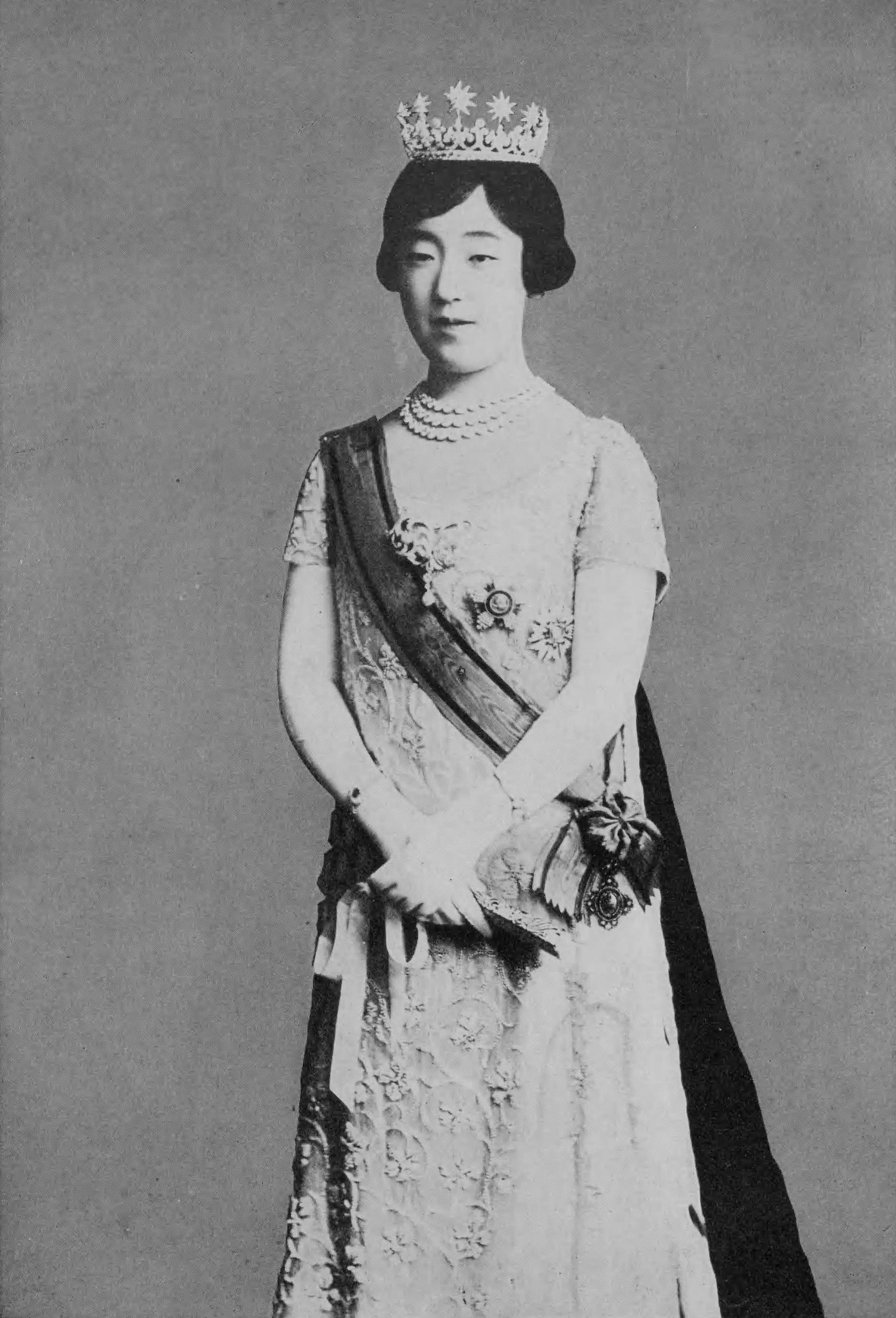
- Formal portrait, c. 1928

Empress consort of Japan
- Tenure: 25 December 1926 – 7 January 1989
- Enthronement: 10 November 1928

Empress dowager of Japan
- Tenure: 7 January 1989 – 16 June 2000
- Born: Princess Nagako (良子女王); 6 March 1903; Azabu, Tokyo, Empire of Japan
- Died: 16 June 2000 (aged 97); Fukiage Palace, Chiyoda, Tokyo, Japan
- Burial: 25 July 2000; Musashi Imperial Graveyard
- Spouse: Hirohito, Emperor Shōwa (m. 1924; died 1989)
- Issue: Shigeko Higashikuni; Sachiko, Princess Hisa; Kazuko Takatsukasa; Atsuko Ikeda; Akihito, Emperor of Japan; Masahito, Prince Hitachi; Takako Shimazu
Posthumous name
- Empress Kōjun (香淳皇后)
- House: Imperial House of Japan
- Father: Kuniyoshi, Prince Kuni
- Mother: Chikako Shimazu

Nagako (良子; 6 March 1903 – 16 June 2000), posthumously honoured as Empress Kōjun (香淳皇后, Kōjun Kōgō), was a member of the Imperial House of Japan, the wife of Emperor Hirohito and the mother of Emperor Emeritus Akihito. She served as Empress of Japan from 1926 until her husband's death in 1989, making her the longest-serving empress consort in Japanese history.

== Early life ==
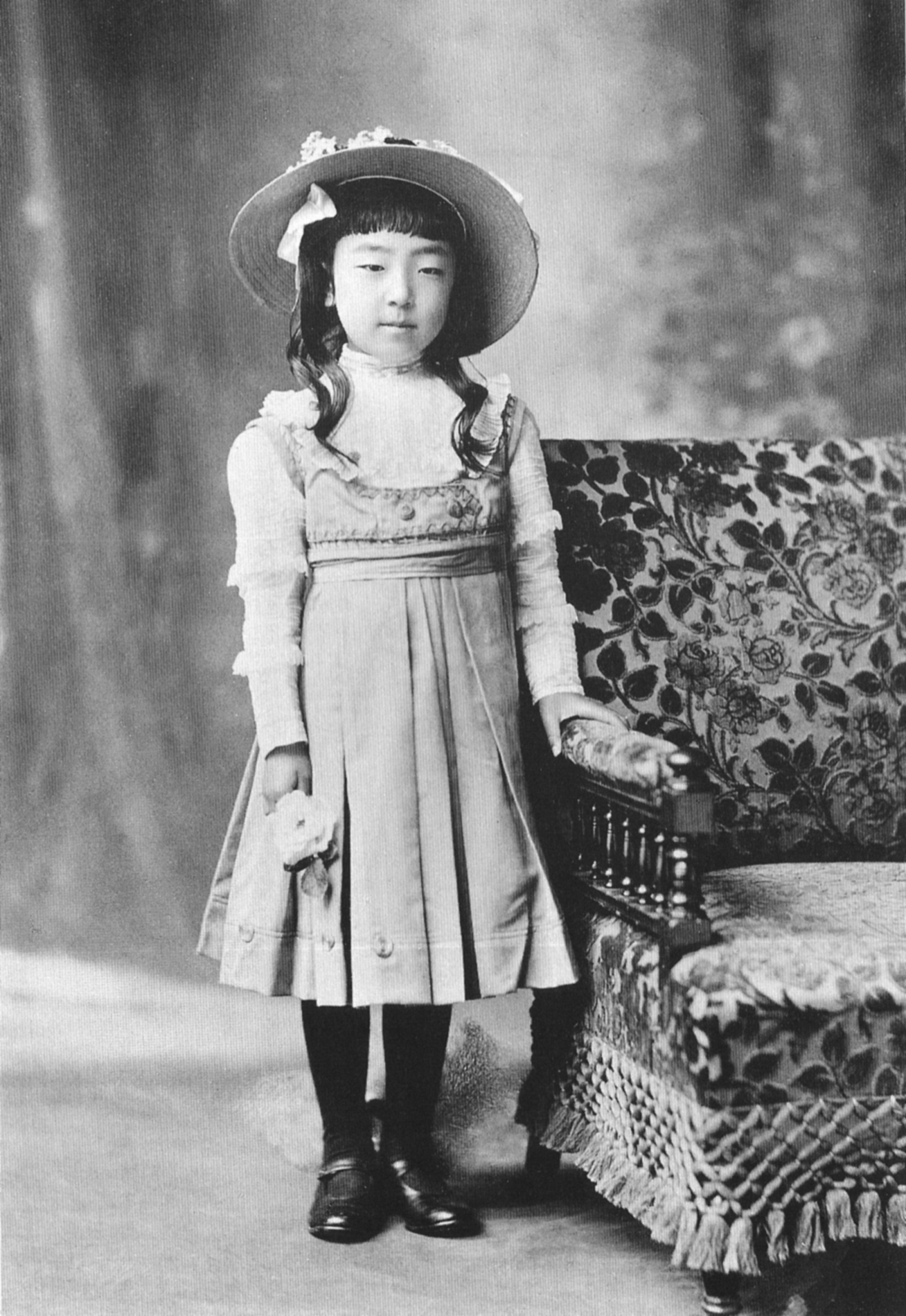
Princess Nagako in 1910 as a child

Princess Nagako (良子女王, Nagako Joō) was born on 6 March 1903 in the family residence of the Kuni-no-miya in the Toriizaka neighbourhood of the Azabu district of Tokyo, Japan. She belonged to one of the Ōke cadet branches of the Imperial House of Japan, which were eligible to provide an heir to the Japanese throne by adoption. By birth she held the title of princess, as the daughter of Kuniyoshi, Prince Kuni (1873–1929) and his consort, Chikako (1879–1956). While her father was a scion of the imperial family, her mother, a daughter of Shimazu Tadayoshi of Satsuma, was descended from daimyō, the feudal military aristocracy. Nagako would later be remembered as one of the last Japanese to have experienced life within the aristocracy prior to the Second World War.

As a child, Nagako attended the Girls' Department of the Peers' School in Tokyo (now Gakushūin), an institution established specifically for the daughters of the aristocracy and imperial family. Among her contemporaries was Yi Bangja, Crown Princess of Korea (then Princess Masako Nashimoto). At the age of fourteen, following her betrothal to the Crown Prince, Nagako was withdrawn from school and entered a six-year training program designed to cultivate the accomplishments considered essential for a future empress.

== Marriage and children ==
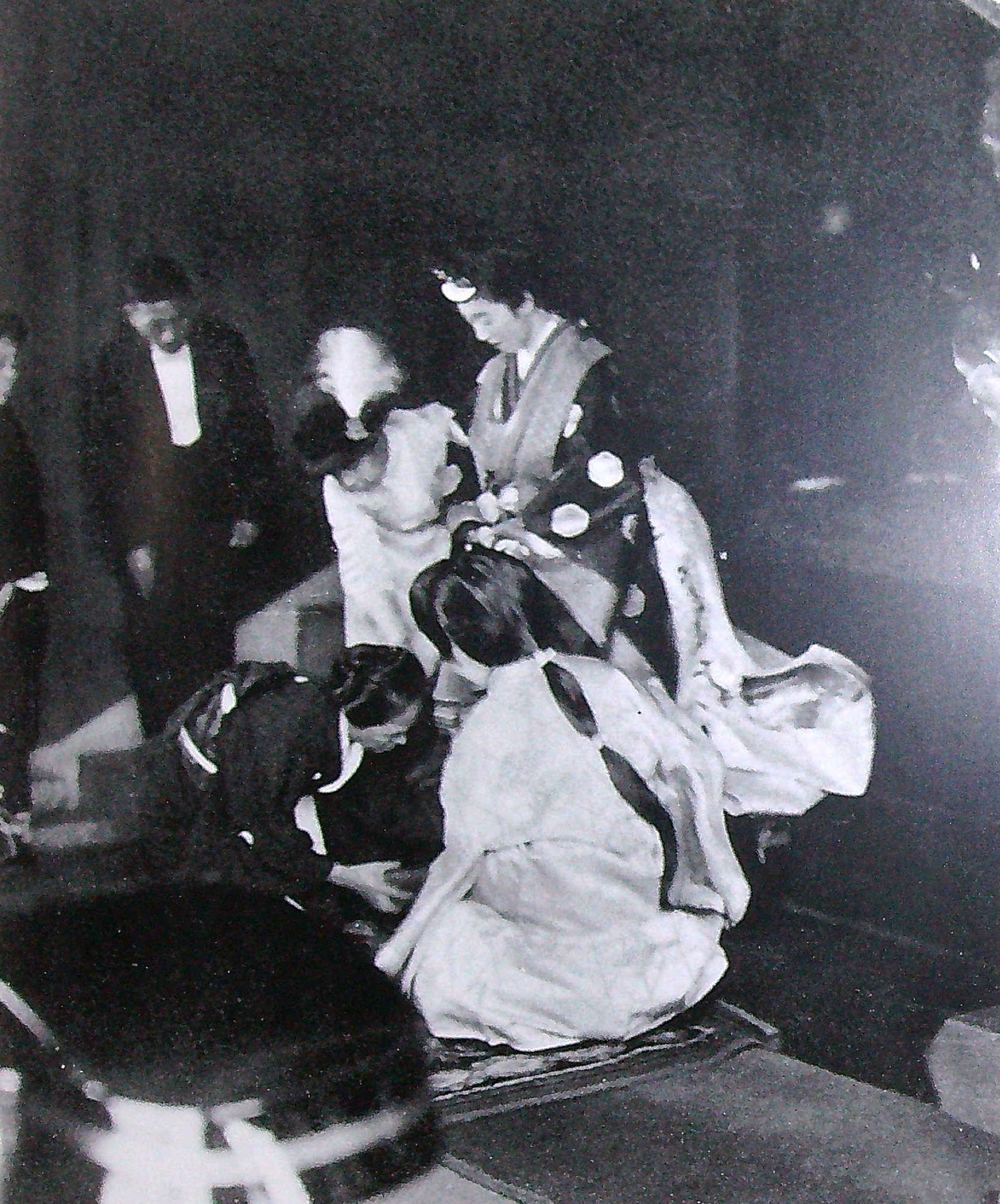
Nagako leaves her family home for wedding of her and Crown Prince Hirohito, 1924

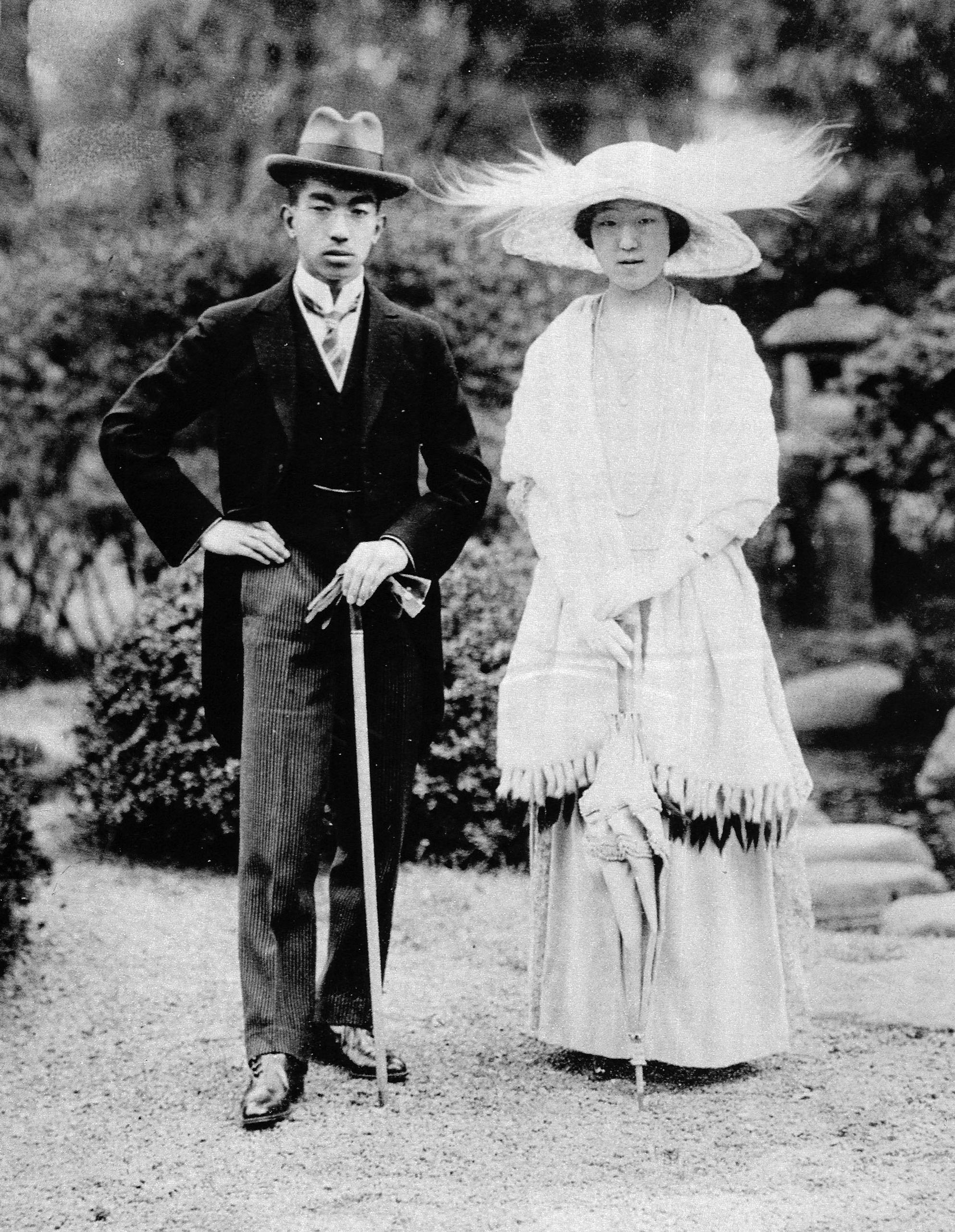
Crown Prince Hirohito and Crown Princess Nagako, 1924

Nagako was betrothed at a young age to her distant cousin, Crown Prince Hirohito, in a marriage arranged by their parents, which was common in Japanese society at the time. (Note: Nagako and Hirohito were distant cousins twice over: fourteenth cousins thrice removed through Prince Fushimi Sadafusa of the Fushimi-no-miya cadet branch of the imperial house, and tenth cousins once removed through Bōjirō Toshimasa (1582–1609), a courtier and noble (kuge).) Her lineage and her father's distinguished military career were the main factors considered. Breaking with tradition, Hirohito was allowed to choose his own bride, although Nagako herself had no say in the matter. In 1917, at the age of 14, she and several other candidates for betrothal took part in a tea ceremony at the Tokyo Imperial Palace, while the Crown Prince observed from behind a screen. He ultimately chose Nagako.

Prime Minister Yamagata Aritomo, a prince from a rival clan, was reportedly opposed to Hirohito's choice. He and other royal clans tried to dissuade him, claiming that Nagako's maternal relatives included individuals with colour-blindness. In January 1919, the engagement of Princess Nagako to Crown Prince Hirohito was officially announced. During their six-year engagement, they met only nine times, each under the supervision of a chaperone.

Princess Nagako married Crown Prince Hirohito on 26 January 1924, becoming Crown Princess of Japan. The wedding was delayed due to the aftermath of the 1923 Great Kantō earthquake and an assassination attempt on Hirohito's life. Their union marked the last occasion on which a future empress was chosen from the minor princely families traditionally providing brides for the main imperial line. She became Empress of Japan upon Hirohito's accession to the throne on 25 December 1926. Unlike his predecessors, Emperor Hirohito decided to abandon the long-standing practice of maintaining concubines, despite previously having 39 court concubines.

Over the first decade of their marriage, Empress Nagako gave birth to four daughters (see Issue). Since she had not produced a son, courtiers urged the Emperor to take concubines, but he remained monogamous. Critics derisively nicknamed her onna bara, meaning “girl womb” or “girl tummy.” Nearly ten years after their wedding, on 23 December 1933, the couple finally had a son, Akihito, providing Japan with an heir. The birth sparked nationwide celebrations, which Nagako later described as "the happiest moment in my life." Hirohito and Nagako had seven children—two sons and five daughters—three of whom predeceased Nagako (see Issue).

== Empress consort ==
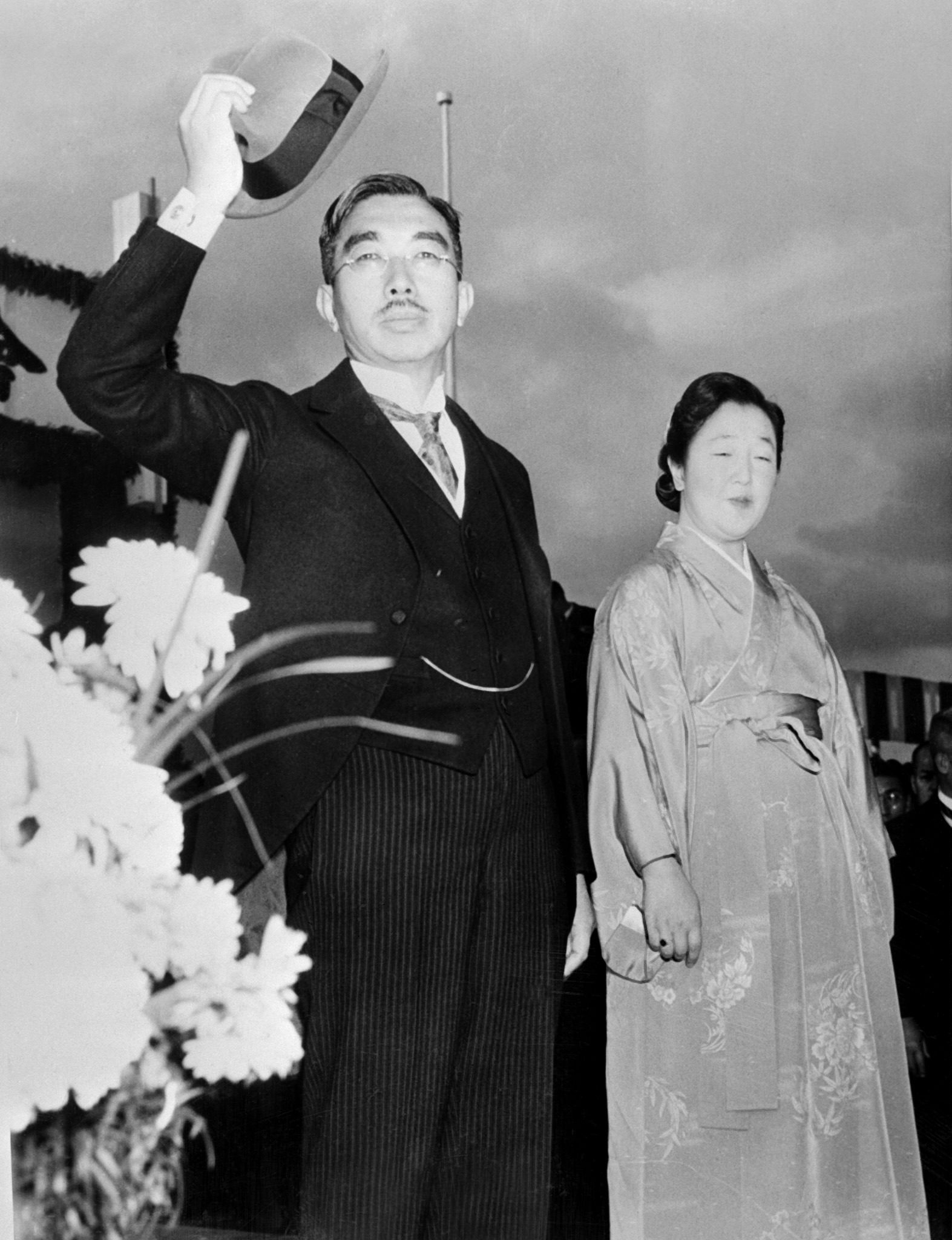
Emperor Hirohito and Empress Nagako in 1946

Empress Nagako performed her ceremonial duties in a traditional manner. She initially came to live in the palace during the time when people there spoke an archaic imperial form of Japanese that has largely disappeared. Her role required her to attend special ceremonies such as those for the 2600th anniversary of the legendary foundation of the Empire of Japan in 1940 or the conquest of Singapore in 1942.

During the Second World War, Nagako was largely confined to palace grounds and her duties involved tending to wounded generals and writing to families who had lost loved ones during the war. Their children were sent to the countryside, while she and Hirohito resided at the Obunko imperial air-raid shelter, which was built in the Fukiage Gardens on palace grounds. Nagako also assisted with growing vegetables and raising poultry.

Her personal views on the war are not well known, though she is reported to have described the war years as "the hardest time of my life". NHK reported that "her heart was in pain when she saw the emperor deeply agitated every day during and immediately after World War II." After the occupation of Japan, the court became more accepting of Western and foreign traditions and Nagako took English lessons from two American tutors. She also toured different parts of Japan to meet orphans and families who had suffered loss.

It is not clear whether Nagako openly disapproved of her son Akihito's choice of a wife when he decided to marry commoner Michiko Shōda, but it was widely reported in the press that she and her daughter-in-law had a strained relationship. Nagako, who was tradition-conscious, sided with those who criticized Michiko for breastfeeding her children, carrying them in public, and raising them herself. A senior chamberlain claimed in his memoir that Michiko once directly asked her mother-in-law why she disliked her. Michiko also held suspicions about her chief lady-in-waiting, whom she believed to be spying on her on the orders of Nagako. Her and Akihito's attempts at dismissing the servant were unsuccessful. The rift between the two women caused Michiko to suffer a nervous breakdown in 1963.

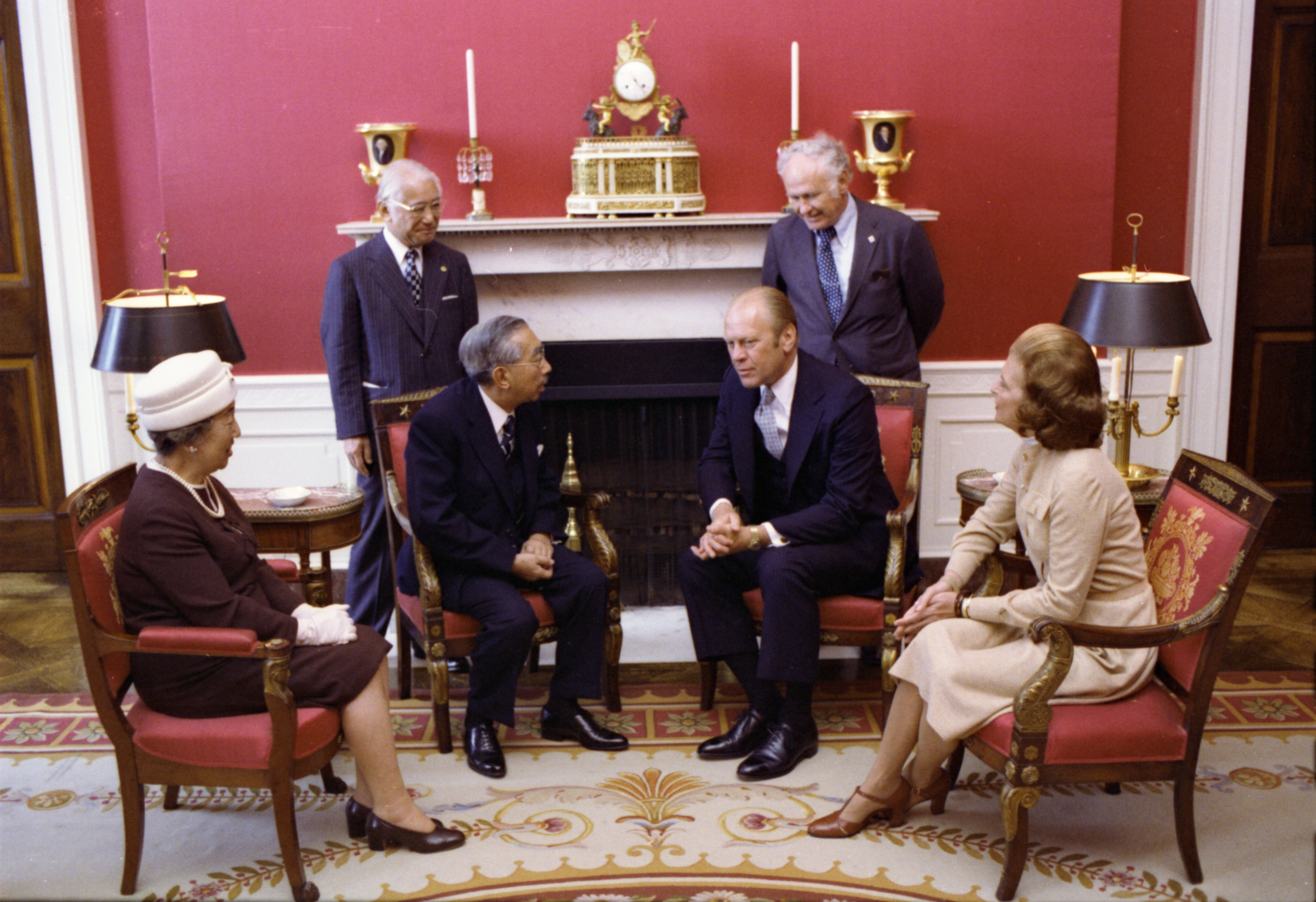
Empress Nagako, Emperor Hirohito, the US President Gerald Ford, and the US First Lady Betty Ford at the Red Room in 1975

Nagako was the first Japanese empress consort to travel overseas. She accompanied Hirohito on his European tour in 1971 and later on his state visit to the United States in 1975. She also took care of him in later years and chose his attire for him. Hirohito was said to have described their union as a source of solace and contentment and Nagako reportedly "showed a subject's deference" to him. Their marriage lasted nearly 65 years, the longest of any Japanese imperial couple.

A talented artist, two collections of Nagako's paintings, which she signed as Toen or Peach Garden, were published and she gifted the UK's Queen Elizabeth II with one of her pieces in 1971. She also wrote waka, a collection of which was published in 1974. She was reported to have enjoyed singing, and played the piano, violin and Japanese harp. Nagako suffered a fall in July 1977, injuring her spine. Following another serious fall, she began using a wheelchair in 1980, and used one for the remainder of her life. The last public ceremony she took part in was her husband's 86th birthday celebrations in April 1987.

== Empress dowager ==
After the Emperor's death on 7 January 1989, she became empress dowager. At that time, she was in failing health herself and could not attend her husband's funeral. She used a wheelchair and remained in seclusion for the rest of her life. A video of her sitting in a wheelchair beside a window was published in 1993. There were also persistent rumours that she was suffering from dementia or Alzheimer's disease. In 1995, she became the longest-living empress dowager of Japan, breaking the record of Empress Kanshi, who had died 868 years earlier.

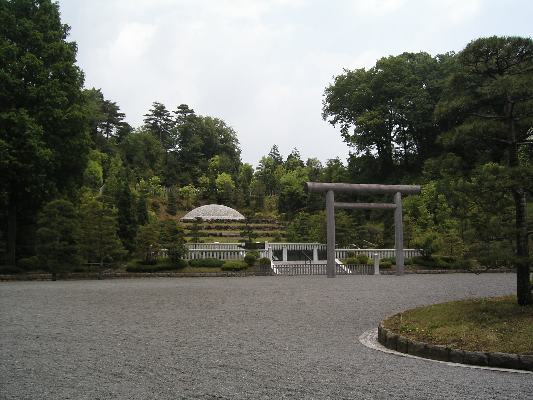
Empress Kōjun's mausoleum in the Musashi Imperial Graveyard

At the time of her death at the age of 97 in 2000, Nagako had been an empress for 74 years. In her final days, the Imperial Household Agency (IHA) announced that she was suffering from breathing problems but that the illness was not serious and she was on a respirator. On 15 June, the IHA director-general told certain segments of the press that her condition had taken a turn and it was reported that she had slipped into a coma on the next day after her blood pressure dropped.

Nagako died at 4:46 pm on 16 June 2000, with her family at her side. Her son Akihito, who had been carrying out public engagements earlier in the day, immediately went to Fukiage Palace and reportedly held his mother's hand as she died. At his request, no injections or intravenous fluids were administered to prevent any suffering. The IHA announced her death at 6:30 pm and gave "old age" as the cause of death.

Following the announcement, neon signs in Ginza and the lights in Tokyo Tower were turned off. The flags flew at half-mast on government buildings, and music and dance were excluded from public events for a day. People also gathered outside palace gates to pay their respects.

A mourning period of 150 days was declared by the imperial court. A team was set up by the IHA to organize her funeral, which largely followed the customs implemented at her mother-in-law Empress Teimei's funeral in 1951. Her funeral was held at the Toshimagaoka Imperial Cemetery on 25 July 2000 and was attended by one thousand mourners, including members of the imperial family, government leaders and foreign diplomats. Her son Akihito was the chief mourner during the service, which featured elements of the Shinto religion. Hundreds of mourners also gathered outside cemetery gates.

Emperor Akihito granted his mother the posthumous title of Empress Kōjun, which means "fragrant purity", drawing inspiration from the Kaifūsō. Her final resting place is in a mausoleum named Musashino no Higashi no Misasagi, near that of her husband within the Musashi Imperial Graveyard.

== Honours ==
=== National ===
- Knight Grand Cordon of the Order of Meiji
- Grand Mistress Paulownia Dame Grand Cordon of the Order of the Precious Crown

=== Foreign ===
- Dame Grand Cross of the Order of Leopold I (Belgium)
- Knight of the Order of the Elephant (Denmark)
- Grand Cross of the Order of Merit of the Federal Republic of Germany, Special Class (Germany)
- Grand Cross of the Order of the Redeemer (Greece)
- Member of the Order of the Benevolent Ruler (Kingdom of Nepal)
- Grand Cross of the Order of the Sun of Peru (Peru) (1961)
- Dame Grand Cross of the Order of Isabella the Catholic (Spain)
- Member Grand Cross of the Royal Order of the Seraphim (Sweden)
- Dame of the Order of the Royal House of Chakri (Thailand)
- Dame Grand Cross with Collar of the Order of the Crown of Tonga (Tonga)

== Issue ==
Empress Kōjun and Emperor Shōwa had seven children (two sons and five daughters).

Name	Birth	Death	Marriage		Children
Name	Birth	Death	Date	Spouse	Children
Shigeko Higashikuni (Shigeko, Princess Teru)	9 December 1925	23 July 1961	10 October 1943	Prince Morihiro Higashikuni	Prince Nobuhiko Higashikuni; Princess Fumiko Higashikuni; Naohiko Higashikuni; Hidehiko Higashikuni; Yūko Higashikuni
Sachiko, Princess Hisa	10 September 1927	8 March 1928	None		
Kazuko Takatsukasa (Kazuko, Princess Taka)	30 September 1929	26 May 1989	20 May 1950	Toshimichi Takatsukasa	Naotake Takatsukasa (adopted)
Atsuko Ikeda (Atsuko, Princess Yori)	7 March 1931 (age 95)		10 October 1952	Takamasa Ikeda	Motohiro Ikeda (adopted)
Akihito, Emperor Emeritus of Japan (Akihito, Prince Tsugu)	23 December 1933 (age 92)		10 April 1959	Michiko Shōda	Naruhito, Emperor of Japan; Fumihito, Crown Prince of Japan; Sayako Kuroda
Masahito, Prince Hitachi (Masahito, Prince Yoshi)	28 November 1935 (age 90)		30 September 1964	Hanako Tsugaru	None
Takako Shimazu (Takako, Princess Suga)	2 March 1939 (age 87)		10 March 1960	Hisanaga Shimazu	Yoshihisa Shimazu

== See also ==
- Empress of Japan
- Ōmiya Palace

== Citations ==
Empress Nagako Imperial House of Japan Born: 6 March 1903 Died: 16 June 2000
Japanese royalty
Preceded by Kujō Sadako	Empress consort of Japan; 1926–1989	Succeeded by Shōda Michiko
Preceded by Kujō Sadako	Empress dowager of Japan; 1989–2000	Succeeded by Vacant
