= Sachiko, Princess Hisa =

Japanese princess (1927–1928)

Sachiko
- Princess Hisa
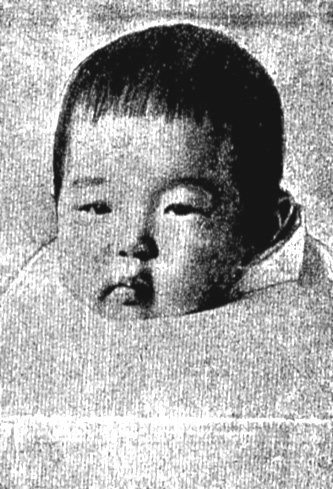
- Princess Sachiko in January 1928
- Born: 10 September 1927; Tokyo Imperial Palace, Tokyo, Japan
- Died: 8 March 1928 (aged 5 months 27 days); Tokyo Imperial Palace, Tokyo, Japan
- Burial: 13 March 1928; Toshimagaoka Imperial Cemetery, Bunkyo, Tokyo
- House: Imperial House of Japan
- Father: Emperor Shōwa
- Mother: Princess Nagako Kuni

Sachiko, Princess Hisa (久宮祐子内親王, Hisa-no-miya Sachiko Naishinnō; 10 September 1927 – 8 March 1928) was the second daughter and child of Emperor Shōwa and his wife, Empress Kōjun. Her personal name was Sachiko, and her title was Hisa-no-miya. Princess Shigeko was her older sister; her younger siblings were born after her death.

Sachiko died in 1928 of pneumonia, aged 5 months and 27 days.

== Birth ==
Princess Sachiko Hisanomiya was born on September 10, 1927, at 4:42 a.m., at Akasaka Palace, as the second child and second princess of Emperor Shōwa and Empress Kōjun. She was 50.8 cm tall and weighed 3300 grams.

On September 16, after the bathing ceremony at 9 am, she was named "Hisa-no-miya" and "Sachiko" at the naming ceremony at 11 am. This title and her name were chosen by her father from three candidates. The origin is the I Ching, known as "ekikyō" (易経) in Japanese. She used the same character as Emperor Gosuzaku's third princess, the first princess's name was Ryōko (sharing the second character) and she also used the same character as her mother, Empress Kōjun. Her protective sword was made by Teiichi Tsukiyama. On December 17 of that same year, she had her first outing when Empress Kōjun visited the Imperial Palace of Emperor Taishō with her older sister, then Imperial Princess Teru-no-miya Shigeko, on the occasion of paying respects.

== Illness and death ==
She was breast-fed by her mother and was growing well, and on March 3, 1928, and it was planned for her to attend her first festival on a grand scale. Her parents prepared 30 kinds of hina sweets, and gifts were prepared from the Kuninomiya family, the family house of Empress Kōjun, and from the princesses of Emperor Meiji who became consorts of the Imperial Palace. The princesses were Princess Masako Takeda, Fusako Kitashirakawa, Princess Nobuko Asaka, and Toshiko Higashikuni, who would be considered "great aunts" of Sachiko.

On the morning of February 27, she suddenly developed a high fever. The symptoms of eczema that had been present in the past worsened, swelling of the right submandibular lymph gland was also observed, and a diagnosis of pharyngeal catarrh was made. The New Year's holiday celebration was postponed, and the Empress and court physicians took care of her. On March 1, when the onset of the illness was announced, doctors said that "it was not enough to worry about".

However, at 9 pm on March 4, her temperature rose again to around 39 °C, she was in critical condition, and sepsis was suspected. The empress and her ladies-in-waiting stayed up all night to nurse her. At the same time, her father had a fever, but this was due to a cold. By the afternoon of the 5th, her physical condition seemed to have recovered, but after the morning of the 6th, the high fever continued again. The events planned for the Empress's birthday on that day were cancelled, and her maternal grandparents, who were staying at Atami, were requested to return to Tokyo by midnight.

At 4 pm on the 7th, she was diagnosed with a complication of sepsis. At 3:30 am on the following day, she became critically ill, and at 3:38 am she died in Akasaka Palace. She was 5 months and 27 days old.

Later, entertainment broadcasts and Army Memorial Day events were voluntarily suspended. Article 17 of the Imperial Funeral Ordinance did not apply to Sachiko who was under the age of seven, so a simple funeral was held on March 13, and she was buried in Toshimagaoka Cemetery. The chief mourner was Yahachi Kawai, the Empress's domestic administration. On March 19, the Emperor and Empress, accompanied by Sachiko's older sister, Shigeko, visited the Toshimagaoka Cemetery and paid their respects at Sachiko's grave.

Empress Kōjun said that, out of grief, she held a doll of the same weight for a while afterwards. The empress also gave a grant to Keifukukai (now the Social Welfare Corporation Imperial Gift Foundation, Keifuku Childcare Association) and the organization established the "Late Princess Sachiko Hisa-no-miya Commemorative Child Protection Fund" which created facilities throughout the country and also overseas for the protection of infants.
