= Hirohito and the Making of Modern Japan =

2000 biographical book by Herbert P. Bix

- Front cover of the hardback first edition
- Author: Herbert P. Bix
- Language: English
- Genre: Biography
- Publisher: HarperCollins Publishers
- Publication date: September 2000
- Publication place: United States
- Pages: 814
- ISBN: 0-06-019314-X
- Dewey Decimal: 940.5352
- LC Class: D767.2 .T58

Hirohito and the Making of Modern Japan is a 2000 biographical book by American historian Herbert P. Bix covering the reign of Emperor Hirohito from 1926 until his death in 1989. It won the 2001 Pulitzer Prize for General Nonfiction.

Much of the information in the book was uncovered by Japanese people who worked with Bix, but publishing companies and press in Japan at the time chose not to reveal the information. Bix stated that he did not want the book to be used as a weapon against the Japanese people.

== Background ==
According to Herbert P. Bix, the book came about because of his long-standing personal interest in the Japanese “emperor system” and the availability of new sources after Emperor Hirohito’s death. In 1990, the literary magazine Bungei Shunjū printed an abridged version of the emperor's 1946 dictation of key events during the first twenty years of his rule to his aides, dubbed the “Monologue” (独白録, dokuhakuroku). After reading this text, Bix realised that it was “possible to focus a study on Hirohito, the Imperial House, and the ideology of emperorism”. To facilitate research for the book, he waited for other important historical material and primary sources, such as the seven-volume diary of Nobuhito, Prince Takamatsu, the Emperor's younger brother, to be published.

A second motivation for writing the book was the contextual similarities between prewar Japan and then-contemporary Japan. As the author explains in an interview:

Although Japan’s international situation and strategic position in East Asia was quite unlike what it had been before World War II, the parties and the bureaucracy seemed to me to be acting as they had in the Empire of Japan. They were putting their organizational concerns ahead of the general public concern, acting in their own rather than the national interest. The longer I worked on Hirohito, the more I saw opportunities to bring out implicit parallelisms in political behavior between inter-war and wartime imperial Japan and the Japan in which I was living at the end of the twentieth century. I thought that would furnish the historical background for understanding Japanese styles of leadership, especially the distinctive Japanese system of irresponsibility in decision making.

== Content ==
Bix contends that Emperor Shōwa was not a politically passive constitutional monarch and exercised formal authority independent of the establishment. According to him, imperial Japan never adopted Western-style constitutional monarchy and the emperor possessed formidable moral, legal, and political power as the head of a theocratic state. He writes that

the emperor, as the source of law, transcended the constitution, whose purpose was not to place limits on his powers but the very opposite—to protect him and provide a mechanism enabling him to exercise authority unimpeded by limits. This system of government can be called a kind of constitutionally guided but by no means constitutional monarchy.

Based on this interpretation, Hirohito actively took part in national policy formulation, issued military orders, and influenced Japanese war strategy and operations. Bix's second thesis is that the emperor's primary motivation behind all these actions was the safeguarding of the throne with him as its occupant.

The book is divided into four parts, covering Hirohito's childhood and school years, his regency and early reign, his position as commander-in-chief during the war, and his life in the aftermath of Japan's defeat.

=== Part I: The Prince's Education, 1901-1921 ===
This section focuses on Hirohito's early upbringing and tutelage under military officers and royalist academics. He was “brought up to believe that the entire history of modern Japan centred on his grandfather and the small group of talented officials who had assisted him”. Consequently, he strove to emulate his grandfather as a model of the perfect monarch. His other childhood hero, Bix claims, was General Nogi, who instilled in him the virtues of frugality, diligence, and endurance, as well as the belief that “strong resolve could compensate to some extent for physical deficiencies”. While in school, his teachers Shigetake Sugiura, Kura Shiratori, and Tōru Shimizu lectured on the moral and spiritual superiority of the Japanese imperial house, rooted in its divine origins and history of benevolence, and emphasised the centrality of the emperor in fostering progress, national power, and empire-building as a transcendent sovereign who always acts in the state's best interests. The education in his formative years shaped Hirohito's outlook and future approach to emperorship, where convictions of his own sacred authority and political inviolability encouraged him to act unilaterally when circumstances demanded it. Instruction in Shinto rituals from a young age cultivated his religious identity and conditioned Hirohito to dedicate his life to the preservation of the throne out of a deep sense of moral obligation to his ancestors “who were the source of his being, his authority, his household fortune, and indeed whatever sustained both him and the nation”.

=== Part II: The Politics of Good Intentions, 1922-1930 ===
In the next section, Bix chronicles Hirohito's path to political ascendancy, beginning with his inauguration as regent for his ailing father in November 1921. He presided over a time when the prestige of the imperial institution had waned considerably due to his father's indisposition, triggering intense public debate about the legitimacy of monarchical rule. To reaffirm the importance of the monarchy as the source of the nation's morality and establish a closer relationship between the emperor and his subjects, Hirohito’s court conducted a series of domestic tours and an overseas excursion to colonial Taiwan. This presaged the start of ideological indoctrination into a cult of emperor worship based on “his double image as living deity...and supreme commander of the armed forces”. After his enthronement in 1926, Hirohito and his court followed an active policy of imperial supervision and intervention in political matters whereby his wishes were executed through frequent informal consultations, briefings, and feedback from the emperor. While Hirohito initially supported a policy of international diplomacy because of the perceived economic gains, Bix indicates that an unquestioning acceptance of “the coalition nature of government, in which the military was privileged over other organs of state” led him and his advisers to ultimately align themselves with the military against a backdrop of rising nationalism. As a result, the imperial court failed to address the breakdown in military discipline and condoned the Mukden incident, leading directly to the Japanese invasion of Manchuria and outbreak of the Second Sino-Japanese War.

=== Part III: His Majesty's Wars, 1931-1945 ===
The third section, the longest at 295 pages, details Hirohito's role in the wars with China and the Allied Powers. His disregard of China as a modern state prompted him to sanction imperial aggression and expansionism in mainland China, including the Nanjing Massacre, use of poison gas, and “burn all, kill all, steal all” annihilation campaigns, provided they did not bring Japan into direct conflict with the West. To coordinate the war effort, Hirohito established the Imperial Headquarters, from which he actively “exercised final command over both armed services” through questions, admonitions, and instructions to his ministers and chiefs of staff. However, beset by interservice rivalry between the army and navy and his rigid insistence on “unity” which hampered the resolution of strategic differences, Bix holds that the emperor was never able to achieve singularity of purpose. This allowed the country to be dragged into a protracted struggle with China on one hand and war in the Pacific on the other, despite Hirohito's reluctance to oppose the Allies and Japan's inferior military capabilities. Hirohito's optimism that success could be obtained through hard work no matter the challenges compounded operational problems, as he ordered attacks even in situations where the chances of success were extremely low, refusing to concede defeat. When it was finally clear that Japan could not win, he delayed surrender, first by futilely attempting to enlist Soviet mediation to end the war and then by rejecting the Potsdam Declaration unless the existence of the monarchy was guaranteed. This resulted in the atomic bombings of Hiroshima and Nagasaki, which Bix asserts provided a convenient excuse for Hirohito to frame his decision to surrender as a benevolent act aimed at sparing his people from more suffering, when in reality he wanted to avoid the threat of domestic implosion posed by escalating levels of anti-imperial hostility.

=== Part IV: The Unexamined Life, 1945-1989 ===
The final section examines Hirohito's fate after the war. He was forced to renounce his divinity and reduced to a purely ceremonial status that held no political authority. Nonetheless, the emperor resisted calls from members of the royal family and prominent left-wing intellectuals to abdicate and cooperated with General Douglas MacArthur, Supreme Commander for the Allied Powers, to ensure his continued existence on the throne. The Americans sought to use the emperor as a symbolic figure around whom the Japanese population could rally in the ashes of defeat while the occupiers instituted democratic reforms. By exempting him from the Tokyo trials, assigning blame to a small group of military elites, and manipulating court proceedings, they were able to protect Hirohito's reign. In reciprocation, Hirohito and his entourage convinced General Hideki Tōjō and other high-ranking military officials to accept full accountability for the empire's actions and reconfigured the myth of the imperial house as a vehicle for democracy. The failure to try Hirohito, argues, had a profound and long-lasting negative consequence for Japan's acknowledgement of its militaristic past. Since the emperor, a “symbol” of the nation, was not held responsible, this precluded reflection on their war responsibility by the Japanese government and people. Hirohito maintained the façade of the emperor as an innocent and powerless bystander until his death. Privately, he lamented his diminished standing as “nothing more than a papier-mâché doll” and attempted to affect government policy by sharing his opinions with government leaders when receiving secret reports on affairs of the state.

== Themes ==
A significant theme of the book is the trend of militarism in the absence or ineffectiveness of democratic institutions. Another theme is the distortion and falsification of historical records. In the book's introduction, the author highlights the worrying effects of manipulating and altering a nation's collective memory of the past:

A major concern of this book is Hirohito's failure to publicly acknowledge his own moral, political and legal accountability for the long war fought in his name and under his active direction, both as head of state and supreme commander…Eventually Hirohito became the prime symbol of his people’s repression of their wartime past. For as long as they did not pursue his central role in the war, they did not have to question their own.

Referencing historian Yutaka Yoshida's term of the “double standard”, which denotes how to the outside world, Japan appears to accept responsibility for the war per Article 11 of the San Francisco Peace Treaty but denies it domestically, Bix charges Hirohito with being the ultimate symbol of this duplicity that was facilitated by granting him immunity from punishment. To Bix, the emperor's participation in national ceremonies mourning the war dead served as a subtle and indirect reminder that “the question of his own war responsibility should not be reopened”, effectively constituting a refusal to confront his wartime culpability.

== Reception ==
=== Popular reception ===
Hirohito and the Making of Modern Japan received praise from non-specialist readers for its bold premise. George Wehrfritz of Newsweek called it “myth-shattering” and “superb”; The Economist labelled it a “historical bombshell”. A reviewer in Publishers Weekly commended Bix for his mastery and extensive use of primary sources to provide “a nuanced and balanced portrayal of an emperor who did not seek out war, but who demanded victories once war began and never took action to stop Japan's reckless descent into defeat”, describing it as “political biography at its most compelling”.

=== Academic reception ===
==== Positive academic reviews ====
The reaction to the book within the academic community was more mixed. Scholars focused on Bix's sources and translations, the originality of his hypothesis, and the question of the extent to which the emperor was an active agent.

In a largely positive review for the Japanese Journal of Political Science, Andrew Gordon praised Bix for “assembl[ing] an impressive body of evidence to support his major claims”, believing “they will stand up to close scrutiny and serve as a point of departure and reference for future scholars”. He agreed with Bix's assessment of Emperor Shōwa as an activist monarch who took his constitutional duties very seriously, although he felt that too much agency was ascribed to Hirohito in several instances where the available evidence did not ordinarily support such an interpretation. For example, he took issue with Bix's usage of the word “bestowed” to describe the appointment of Admiral Makoto Saitō to the prime ministership in 1932 after the assassination of ex-journalist Tsuyoshi Inukai, drawing upon his own study of the matter to clarify that the emperor may simply have been ratifying a decision by the military to not have another civilian Prime Minister. Gordon proposed that “Bix could have strengthened his case by pulling back at such key points in the narrative to discuss the difficulty of assessing responsibility for a decision (or a non-decision) in the opaque and complex politics of imperial Japan”.

==== Negative academic reviews ====
Ben-Ami Shillony's article in The Journal of Japanese Studies was less enthusiastic and questioned the presentation of evidence regarding the book's central argument of Hirohito as a major, active participant in the war. To Shillony, “the author accepts the evidence that fits his theory, but discards that which contradicts it”. He went on to explain that “Bix bases his theory on the vast powers the emperor wielded, on the aggressive edicts, orders, and declarations he issued, and on the hawkish persons he appointed to leadership positions”, while ignoring the reality that such imperial documents were drafted by organs of the state and candidates had been decided beforehand by his advisers. Disagreeing with Bix's inference from diaries and memoirs by those closest to him that the emperor privately counselled and pushed the military towards aggression like a Western commander-in-chief, Shillony countered that “[h]ad Hirohito been a real leader, like Hitler, Stalin, Roosevelt, or Churchill, he would have issued his orders directly without having to resort to backroom maneuvers”. Moreover, he observed that “Bix shows a visceral aversion to the emperor and the monarchy” and “blames Hirohito for all that went wrong, but does not credit him with any achievement”.

Harry Harootunian was baffled by the glowing reception of Bix's book, both in Japan, where advance sales reportedly surpassed the latest instalment of the Harry Potter series, and overseas. Writing in Critical Asian Studies, he suggested that “advance publicity accompanying the publication of this book overdetermined the importance to Bix's narrative and encouraged the exaggerating of its actual originality”, considering that Japanese historians such as Daikichi Irokawa had already authored works exposing the myth of the Shōwa Emperor as a pacifist constitutional monarch. Furthermore, Harootunian disputed the book's title and cautioned that “to appeal to a singular life, however important, as a metonym for grasping the larger and unenvisaged totality is always a dangerous tactic for historians and biographers”. He ventured that the relationship between “the making of modern Japan” and Hirohito needs to be considered instead within the broader context of political and economic structures, particularly in terms of how

the reconfiguration of the emperor led to the installation of a sociocultural order founded on the primacy of solidarity that was able to deliver the prospect of even greater political control, disciplined and self-sacrificing work, and global economic status without resorting to outright physical coercion and military violence.

Noriko Kawamura criticised Bix's translations and interpretations in the footnotes of Emperor Hirohito and the Pacific War. Kawamura remained unconvinced of his reading of the emperor as an absolute monarch and commander-in-chief who was actively involved in Japan's war efforts, declaring that “Bix's argument is not supported by evidence. He simply quotes Japanese historians’ assertions from their secondary works, and his use of primary sources is misleading. For example, when he quotes from Harada Kumao's diary, he mistranslates it”. Concerning Bix's accusation that the emperor deliberately postponed surrender out of self-interest, she wrote that “the selective use of evidence makes his work unpersuasive”.

Barton Bernstein, in an essay contributed to the anthology The End of the Pacific War, commented that despite having elucidated his stand in a series of research articles published in the 1990s, Bix was “[s]till operating with rather limited evidence that failed to establish part of his core argument” in his biography of Emperor Hirohito. In addition, he alluded to how some critics were frustrated that Bix did not address the counter-arguments of other scholars, such as Stephen Large and Edward J. Drea. Bernstein surmised that Bix's neglect of rival points of view may have been part of a deliberate marketing strategy to attract the general, non-academic public, since scholarly discourse “often reaches beyond the tolerance of a lay audience, unless the issues are part of their own deeply felt concerns”.

=== Commercial success ===
The book seemed to be a commercial success both domestically and abroad—Bernstein reported from a telephone conversation with the author on October 14, 2004 that at least 50,000 hardcopies and 25,000 paperbacks were sold in the United States that year, whereas in Japan, where the biography was split into two parts, the first volume registered approximately 50,000 hardback sales and the second 25,000. The book was also translated into Chinese and Korean.
