= Supreme Commander for the Allied Powers =

Head of the Allied occupation of Japan

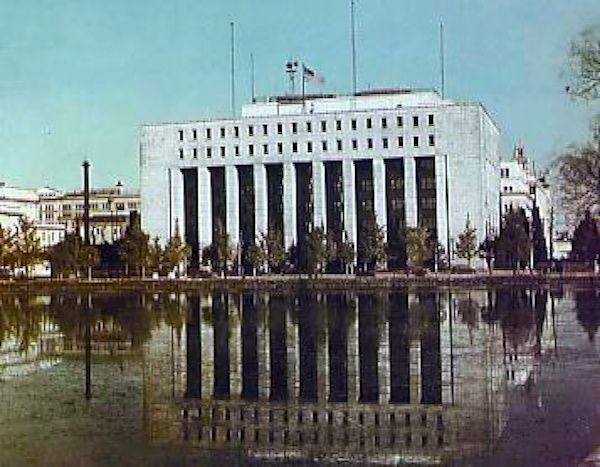
The Dai-Ichi Seimei Building which served as SCAP headquarters, c. 1950

The Supreme Commander for the Allied Powers (Japanese: 連合国軍最高司令官, romanized: Rengōkokugun saikōshireikan), or SCAP, was the title held by General Douglas MacArthur during the United States–led Allied occupation of Japan following World War II. It issued SCAP Directives (alias SCAPIN, SCAP Index Number) to the Japanese government, aiming to suppress its "militaristic nationalism". The position was created at the start of the occupation of Japan on August 14, 1945. It was originally styled the Supreme Commander of the Allied Powers.

In Japan, the position was generally referred to as GHQ (General Headquarters), as SCAP also referred to the offices of the occupation, which was officially referred by SCAP itself as General Headquarters, Supreme Commander for the Allied Powers (連合国軍最高司令官総司令部, Rengōkokugun saikōshireikan sōshireibu; abbreviated as GHQ–SCAP), including a staff of several hundred US civil servants as well as military personnel. Some of these personnel effectively wrote a first draft of the Japanese Constitution, which the National Diet then ratified after a few amendments. Australian, British Empire, and New Zealand forces under SCAP were organized into a sub-command known as British Commonwealth Occupation Force.

These actions led MacArthur to be viewed as the new Imperial force in Japan by many Japanese political and civilian figures, even being considered to be the rebirth of the shōgun-style government which Japan was ruled under until the start of the Meiji Restoration. American biographer William Manchester argues that without MacArthur's leadership, Japan would not have been able to make the move from an imperial, totalitarian state to a democracy. At his appointment, MacArthur announced that he sought to "restore security, dignity and self-respect" to the Japanese people.

MacArthur was also in charge of southern Korea from 1945 to 1948 due to the lack of clear orders or initiative from Washington, D.C. There was no plan or guideline given to MacArthur from the Joint Chiefs of Staff or the State Department on how to rule Korea, resulting in a tumultuous 3 year military occupation that led to the creation of the U.S.-friendly Republic of Korea in 1948. He ordered Lieutenant General John R. Hodge, who accepted the surrender of Japanese forces in southern Korea in September 1945, to govern that area on SCAP's behalf and report to him in Tokyo.

== General MacArthur ==
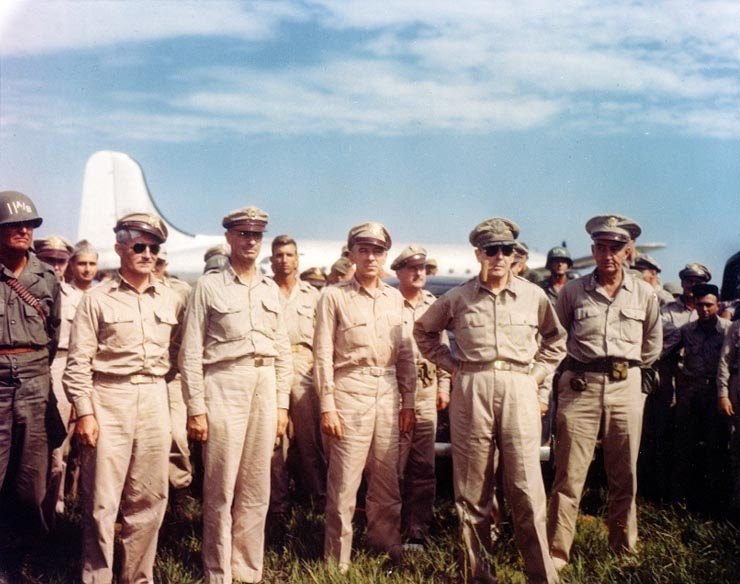
MacArthur arrives at Atsugi airfield in Kanagawa, August 30th, 1945

SCAP is oftentimes synonymous with its appointed post war leader, American General Douglas MacArthur.

As Supreme Commander for the Allied Powers, MacArthur decided not to prosecute Shirō Ishii and all members of the bacteriological research units in exchange for germ warfare data based on human experimentation. On May 6, 1947, he wrote to Washington that "additional data, possibly some statements from Ishii probably can be obtained by informing Japanese involved that information will be retained in intelligence channels and will not be employed as 'War Crimes' evidence." The deal was concluded in 1948.

According to historian Herbert Bix in Hirohito and the Making of Modern Japan, "MacArthur's truly extraordinary measures to save the Emperor from trial as a war criminal had a lasting and profoundly distorting impact on Japanese understanding of the lost war." MacArthur's reasoning was that if the emperor were executed or sentenced to life imprisonment there would be a violent backlash and revolution from the Japanese of all social classes, and this would interfere with his primary goal of changing Japan from a militarist, feudal society to a pro-Western modern democracy. In a cable sent to General Dwight Eisenhower in February 1946, MacArthur stated that executing or imprisoning the emperor would require the use of one million occupation soldiers to keep the peace.

=== SCAP's relationship with Japanese leadership ===
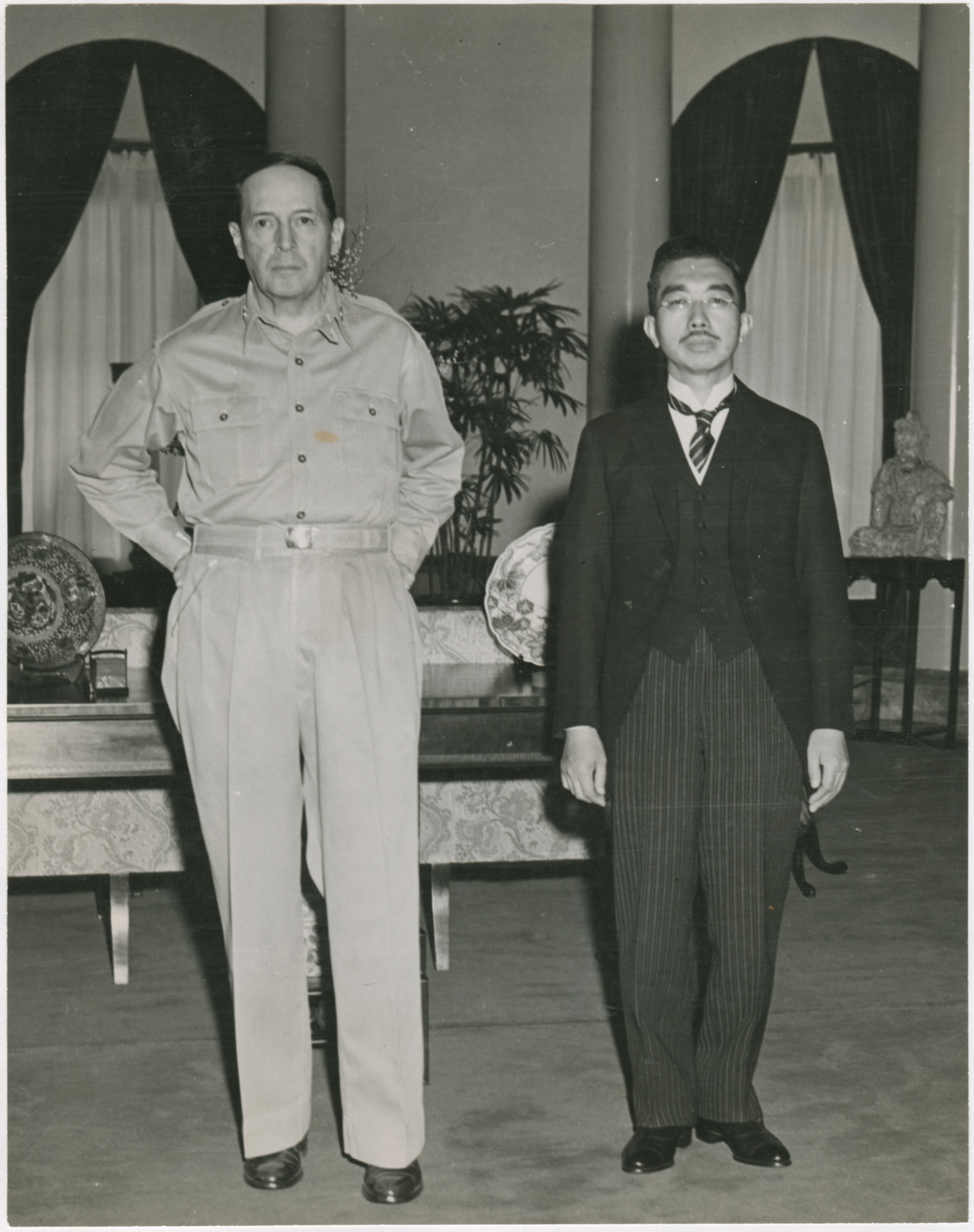
General MacArthur and Emperor Hirohito, 29th of September, 1945

The relationship between Japanese leadership and SCAP was tense, as SCAP domineered the former on the path to post war reconstruction. MacArthur was focused on the task at hand, shown by his refusal to address the Japanese leadership or public directly, instead electing to go straight to and from his office every day, without stops.

MacArthur and SCAP were adamant that the Emperor especially be shielded from responsibility for the war. MacArthur allowed the Emperor to issue statements that allowed for post war SCAP policy to be reframed as continued Meiji restoration, allowing the Emperor to cling to legitimacy. These views would be reflected in the first eight articles of the Constitution of Japan.

== Transforming Japan ==
A major land reform was conducted, led by Wolf Ladejinsky of MacArthur's SCAP staff; however, Ladejinsky himself stated that the true architect of the land reform was Hiroo Wada, then-Minister of Agriculture and Fisheries from the Japan Socialist Party. Between 1947 and 1949, approximately 4,700,000 acres (1,900,000 ha), or 38% of Japan's cultivated land, was purchased from the landlords under the government's reform program, and 4,600,000 acres (1,860,000 ha) was resold to the farmers who worked them. By 1950, 89% of all agricultural land was owner-operated and only 11% was tenant-operated. MacArthur's efforts to encourage trade union membership met with phenomenal success, and by 1947, 48% of the non-agricultural workforce was unionized. Some of MacArthur's reforms were rescinded in 1948 when his unilateral control of Japan was ended by the increased involvement of the State Department. During the Occupation, SCAP successfully, if not entirely, abolished many of the financial coalitions known as the Zaibatsu, which had previously monopolized industry. Eventually, looser industrial groupings known as Keiretsu evolved. The reforms alarmed many in the U.S. Departments of Defense and State, who believed they conflicted with the prospect of Japan and its industrial capacity as a bulwark against the spread of communism in Asia.

Japan's hereditary peerage, called kazoku, that lasted for over a millennium in different but essentially similar forms, was abolished by the new Japanese constitution that was heavily influenced by MacArthur. This was similar to the European peerage system involving princes, barons and counts that were not part of the royal family. Also, the extended royal family, called ōke and shinnōke, was abolished and stripped of all rights and privileges, transforming into commoners immediately. The only Japanese that were allowed to call themselves a part of royalty or nobility after the U.S. occupation were the emperor and about 20 of his direct family members. This action by MacArthur and the writers of the constitution helped transform Japan drastically by abolishing all of the old extended royal family class and the nobility class.

== Welfare programs ==
One of the largest of the SCAP programs was Public Health and Welfare, headed by US Army Colonel Crawford F. Sams. Working with the SCAP staff of 150, Sams directed the welfare work of the American doctors and organized entirely new Japanese medical welfare systems along American lines. The Japanese population was in a poor state: most people were badly worn down, doctors and medicines were very scarce, and sanitary systems had been bombed out in larger cities. Sams' earliest priorities were in distributing food supplies from the United States. Millions of refugees from the defunct overseas empire were pouring in, often in bad physical shape, with a high risk of introducing smallpox, typhus and cholera. The outbreaks that did occur were localized, as emergency immunization, quarantine, sanitation, and delousing prevented massive epidemics. Sams, who was promoted to Brigadier General in 1948, worked with Japanese officials to establish vaccine laboratories, reorganize hospitals along American lines, upgrade medical and nursing schools, and bring together Japanese, international, and US teams that dealt with disasters, child care, and health insurance. He set up an Institute of Public Health for educating public health workers and a National Institute of Health for research, and set up statistical divisions and data collection systems.

== Constitution ==
One of the most significant actions of SCAP during the occupation was the drafting of a new Japanese constitution. One of MacArthur's top priorities was an overhaul of the existing Meiji Constitution, to bring the country in line with its new democratic government. He gave the task of drafting the constitution to his officers, frustrated by the slowness of legislators. They would finish the task within a week, and presenting the new constitution as a wholesale amendment to the Meiji Constitution. It provided protections to the Emperor, placing him at the head of the state. It was ratified in November 1946 and went into effect May 3, 1947.

=== Article 9 ===
The most polarizing aspect of the Japanese constitution, a part that still sees debate to this day, is the presence of Article 9, a clause covering the status of the Japanese military. The clause outlaws belligerency and prohibits the establishment of organized armed forces by the government. Despite this, Japan maintains a "self defense force" (a de facto defensive military) of around 250,000 active personnel. Article 9 and the JSDF are both hotly contested subjects of debates in modern Japanese politics, as pacifists see the JSDF and military involvement in foreign countries as unconstitutional, while nationalists seek Article 9's removal and a wider rearmament of Japan.

== War crimes issues ==
SCAP arrested 28 suspected war criminals on account of crimes against peace, but it did not conduct the Tokyo Trials; the International Military Tribunal for the Far East was responsible instead. President Harry Truman had negotiated the Japanese surrender on the condition the Emperor would not be executed or put on trial, a condition which SCAP carried out.

As soon as November 26, 1945, MacArthur confirmed to Admiral Mitsumasa Yonai that the emperor's abdication would not be necessary. Before the war crimes trials actually convened, SCAP, the IPS and officials from Hirohito's Shōwa government worked behind the scenes not only to prevent the imperial family from being indicted, but also to slant the testimony of the defendants to ensure that no one implicated the Emperor. High officials in court circles and the Shōwa government collaborated with Allied GHQ in compiling lists of prospective war criminals, while the individuals arrested as Class A suspects and incarcerated in Sugamo Prison solemnly vowed to protect their sovereign against any possible taint of war responsibility.

As Supreme Commander for the Allied Powers, MacArthur also decided not to prosecute Shirō Ishii and all members of the bacteriological research units in exchange for germ warfare data based on human experimentation. On May 6, 1947, he wrote to Washington that "additional data, possibly some statements from Ishii probably can be obtained by informing Japanese involved that information will be retained in intelligence channels and will not be employed as "War Crimes" evidence." The deal was concluded in 1948.

== Media censorship ==
Above the political and economic control SCAP had for the seven years following Japan's surrender, SCAP also had strict control over all of the Japanese media, under the formation of the Civil Censorship Detachment (CCD) of SCAP. The CCD eventually banned a total of 31 topics from all forms of media. These topics included:

- Criticism of SCAP (individuals and the organization).
- All Allied countries.
- Criticism of Allied policy pre- and post-war.
- Any form of imperial propaganda.
- Defense of war criminals.
- Praise of "undemocratic" forms of government, though praise of SCAP itself was permitted.
- The atomic bombings of Hiroshima and Nagasaki.
- Black market activities.
- Open discussion of allied diplomatic relations (Soviet Union–United States relations).

Although some of the CCD censorship laws considerably relaxed towards the end of SCAP, some topics, like the atomic bombings of Hiroshima and Nagasaki, were taboo until 1952 at the end of the occupation.

== Approach to the Japanese Communist Party and Post-War Reforms ==
MacArthur legalized the Japanese Communist Party despite reservations from the United States government and invited them to take part in the 1946 election, which was also the first ever Japanese election to allow women to vote. He ordered the release of all political prisoners of the Imperial Japanese era, including communist prisoners. MacArthur approved the first May Day parade in 11 years in 1946. On the day before the May Day celebrations, which would involve 300,000 Japanese communists demonstrating with red flags and pro-Marxism chants in front of the Tokyo Imperial Palace and the Dai-Ichi Building, a group of would-be assassins led by Hideo Tokayama that planned to assassinate MacArthur with hand grenades and pistols on May Day was stopped and some of its members arrested. Despite this plot the May Day demonstrations went on. MacArthur stopped the Communist Party from gaining any popularity in Japan by releasing their members from prison, conducting landmark land reform for the rural Japanese farmers and peasants, and allowing the communists to freely participate in elections. In the 1946 election they won only 6 seats.

== Legacy ==
Shigeru Yoshida, Prime Minister of Japan signing the San Francisco Peace Treaty on September 8, 1951

MacArthur remained in Japan until relieved by US President Harry S. Truman on 11 April 1951, after which he was succeeded as SCAP by General Matthew Ridgway. The San Francisco Peace Treaty, signed on 8 September 1951, marked the end of the Allied occupation, and when it went into effect on 28 April 1952, Japan was once again an independent state. That same day, General Order 10 was issued, formally dissolving GHQ-SCAP, with its remaining functions transferred to the Far East Command headquartered in Tokyo, before it was in turn abolished on July 1, 1957. The United States continued to administer some Japanese islands after that. For example, Okinawa was continually under US administration until 1972.

=== Active US military presence ===
All branches of the United States military forces are still present in Japan today. They primarily function in a support role, providing defense for Japan and the surrounding region, per the agreements of the US-Japan Mutual Security Treaty. The United States Forces Japan consists of around 50,000 service members deployed all over Japan to protect Japanese and US interests alike. This has led to tension at times between Japanese citizens and American servicemen, with incidents frequently occurring between locals and servicemen and crimes frequently committed by servicemen against locals, such as the 1995 Okinawa rape incident. These incidents led to plans to relocate military bases in Okinawa, namely Marine Corps Air Station Futenma, as three quarters of all USFJ installations are located in the prefecture, despite its small size. However, the plan has been delayed due to protests at the site designated for its relocation on another part of the island.

== See also ==
- Occupation of Japan
- Supreme Allied Commander Europe
- Matthew C. Perry
- Perry Expedition

== Works cited and further reading ==
- Bix, Herbert P. (2000). Hirohito and the Making of Modern Japan. New York: HarperCollins. ISBN 978-0-06-019314-0; OCLC 247018161
- Dower, John W. (1999). Embracing Defeat: Japan in the Wake of World War II. New York: W. W. Norton. ISBN 978-0-393-04686-1; OCLC 39143090
- Gold, Hal. (2003). Japan's Wartime Human Experimentation and the Post-War Cover-up. Boston: Tuttle Publishing. ISBN 978-4-900737-39-6; OCLC 422879915
- James, D. Clayton (1985). Volume 3, Triumph and Disaster 1945–1964. The Years of MacArthur. Boston: Houghton Mifflin. ISBN 978-0-395-36004-0. OCLC 36211311.
- Lind, Jennifer. (2008). Sorry States: Apologies in International Politics Ithaca: Cornell University Press. ISBN 978-0-8014-4625-2; OCLC 214322850
- Manchester, William (1978). American Caesar. New York: Little, Brown and Company, pp 459–544. ISBN 0-316-54498-1
- Schaller, Michael (1985). The American Occupation of Japan: The Origins of the Cold War in Asia. New York: Oxford University Press. ISBN 978-0-19-503626-8. OCLC 11971554.
- Japanese Press Translations Collection from Dartmouth College Library
- Justin Williams papers, served as the Chief of the Legislative Division for the Supreme Commander of the Allied Powers from 1945 to 1952. At the University of Maryland libraries.
