= Kibi dango =

Kibi dango may refer to:

- Kibi dango (millet dumpling) (黍団子, "millet dumpling"), a bygone Japanese food, famous for being the ration of the folktale hero Momotarō
- Kibi dango (Okayama) (吉備団子, "Kibi Province dumpling"), a specialty sweet of Okayama Prefecture
- Nippon-ichi kibi dango (日本一きびだんご, "Japan's number one kibidango"), sweet-rice treats from Hokkaido
- Momojirō no kibi dango (桃次郎のきびだんご), produced in Monou, Miyagi
