= Kudakareta kami, aru fukuinhei no shuki =

Book cover

The book Shattered God: A Diary of a Demobilized Soldier (砕かれた神: ある復員兵の手記, Kudakareta kami: aru fukuinhei no shuki) is a diary of the events that started with the surrender of Japan at the end of World War II, written by Watanabe Kiyoshi. It was published by Iwanami Shoten Publishing in 1983, after the author's death.

== Description ==
This diary was written between September 2, 1945 and April 20, 1946 by a Japanese sailor, Watanabe Kiyoshi, who had been discharged from the Imperial Japanese Navy at the end of World War II. Watanabe writes his daily events beginning with the surrender of Japan and through some of the Allied Occupation of Japan.

Watanabe begins his journal with:

「天皇陛下が処刑されるかもしれない」という噂が村うちに流れている。

"'Perhaps His Majesty the Emperor will be executed' is the rumor that is flowing throughout the village."

This line shows the day-to-day confusions that he was facing during the Japanese surrender and the first stages of the U.S. occupation.

Although there are no English translations, John W. Dower mentions the diary in his Pulitzer Prize–winning book, Embracing Defeat, and Kenneth J. Ruoff mentions it in his book The People's Emperor.

As Dower describes it, Watanabe goes on to write about his intense painful feelings, starting with humiliation at Japan’s defeat. He also comes to feel guilt for taking part in a war of aggression in which some of his compatriots committed atrocities. He especially writes about his anger at those who had enthusiastically promoted the war and were now, without acknowledging any responsibility, advocating friendship with the Americans: from his acquaintances up to the national media and the Emperor. Having been a naïve "Emperor worshipper", he focuses much of his anger on him. For a time he expects the Emperor to apologize and then abdicate or even commit suicide. Dower describes the last entry in the diary:

On April 20, Watanabe left his village to take a job in Tokyo. He had heard that anyone could write a letter to the emperor now, and he did so before leaving. He used the familiar "you" (anata), unthinkable before the surrender, in addressing him. He had fought hard for the emperor in accordance with his orders, Watanabe wrote, but since the defeat he had lost all trust and hope in him. As a result, he wished to sever their relationship. He then offered an accounting of all the salary that he had been paid by the imperial navy and every article he could remember having received in his years of service--a long list indeed, itemizing food as well as clothing and other goods. The total, as he calculated it, came to 4,281 yen and 5 sen. With his letter, he enclosed a check for 4,282 yen. "Thus," the letter concluded, "I owe you nothing."

== About the author ==
Watanabe Kiyoshi was born to a farm owner in Shizuoka Prefecture in 1925 (or the 14th year of the Taisho Period). He died in the summer of 1981 at the age of 56.

=== Military career ===
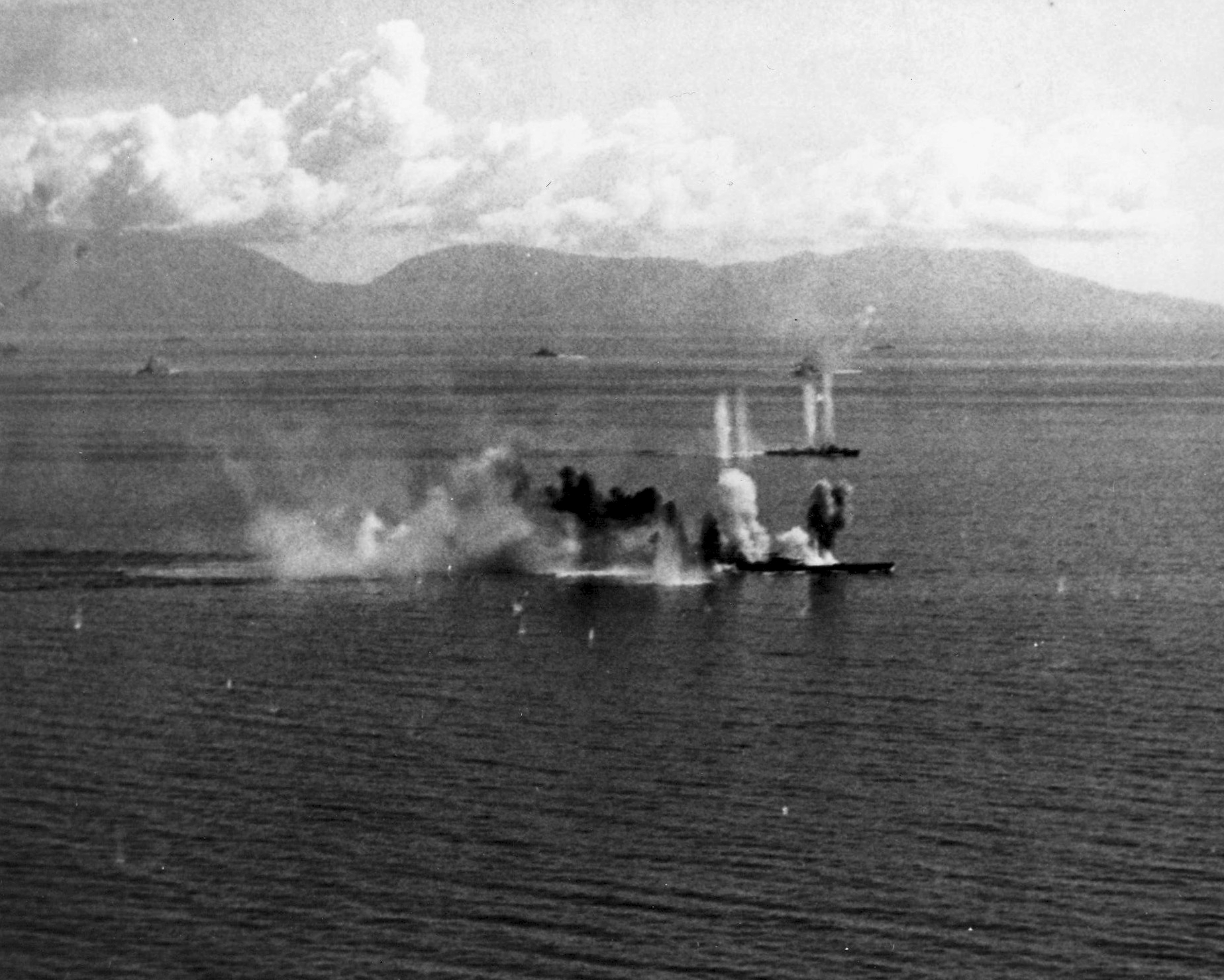
Battleship Musashi under attack

Watanabe was one of 1,376 survivors of the 2,399 military personnel aboard the Musashi when it sank. Watanabe wrote about his experiences on the Musashi in the book Senkan Musashi no Saigo, or "The End of the Battleship Musashi."
