= Bishū =

Bishū or Bishu may refer to:

- Bishū (尾州)
  - another name for Owari Province.
- Bishū (備州)
  - another name for Kibi Province.
  - a collective name for Bizen Province, Bitchū Province, and Bingo Province.
    - these are also called Sanbi (三備).
