= Kibi dango (Okayama) =

Japanese sweet

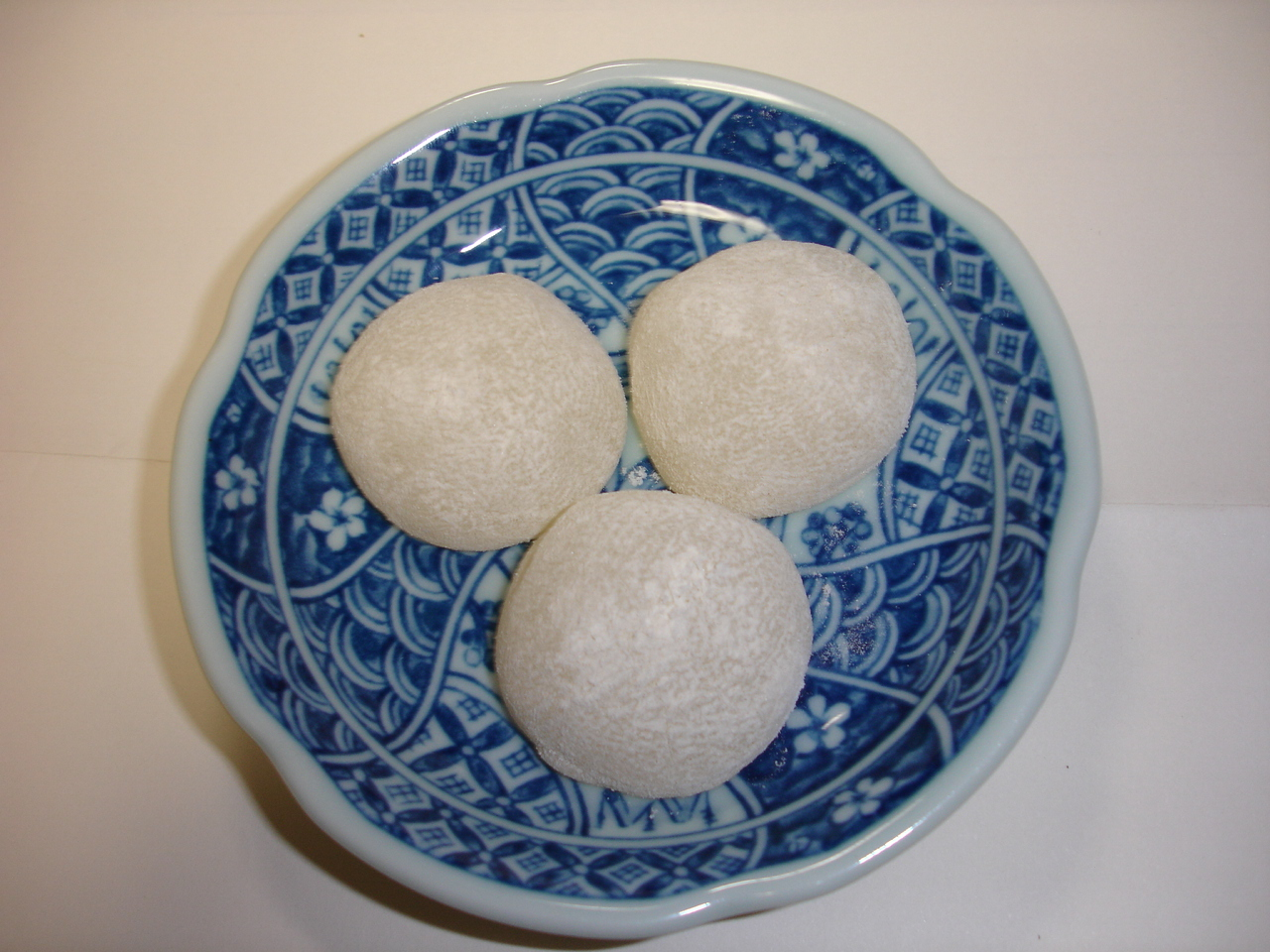
The Okayama Kibi dango on a plate

A Kibi dango (吉備団子, きびだんご; "Kibi Province dumpling") is a type of wagashi sweet or snack with an eponymous reference to Kibi-no-kuni, an old province roughly coincident with today's Okayama Prefecture. It is made by forming gyūhi, a sort of soft mochi, into flat round cakes. Glutinous rice, starch, syrup and sugar are the basic ingredients. It is manufactured by some fifteen confectioners based in Okayama City. While perhaps originally made from kibi (proso millet), the modern recipe uses little or no millet, (Note: Kahara (2004), p. 42 reports that as of its writing "more than fifteen companies in Okayama City have been producing kibi-dango, some of which do not contain millet". Sangetsudō also once advertised that its formula did not use any millet. (See below).) and substantively differs from kibi dango (黍団子, "millet dumpling") of yore, famous from the Japanese heroic folk tale of Momotarō or "Peach Boy"; nevertheless, "Kibi dango" continues to be represented as being the same as the folk hero Peach Boy's dumpling.

The simplistic, and widely disseminated notion regarding its invention is that it was developed in the early Ansei era (c. 1856) by the confectioner Kōeidō, but a local historian has traced a more elaborate multi-phased history in which the founding of this wagashi shop and the development of the modern recipe is pushed to a number of years later. Some hypotheses trace its pre-history to the dumpling (or some other food item) served at the Kibitsu Shrine in Okayama.

The resident deity of this shrine, Kibitsuhiko, is a legendary ogre-slayer, claimed to be the true identity of Momotarō, especially by Okayama locals. The theory originated in the 1930s, and since then there has been concerted effort in the region to promote the folk hero Momotarō as a local of Kibi Province, and his dumplings as "Kibi dango" by default.

== Origins ==
There are irreconcilably differing accounts of the dates and sequences of events regarding the invention. The standard curt explanation is that this specialty dessert was first invented by the confectioner Kōeidō (廣榮堂) during the early Ansei era (1854–). This purveyor later split into two brands, Kōeidō Honten (廣榮堂本店) and Kōeidō Takeda (広栄堂武田), which remain to this day. Takeda is the family name of the original business. The current proprietors give a more complex account of the first origins, but local historians uncovered an even more convoluted history.

=== Family's own account ===
The official line version, endorsed by the Kōeidō Honten, is that the family ran a ceramics merchant named "Hirose-ya (廣瀬屋)" for 7 generations running, until it switched business to that of a confectioner in 1856, changing the shop name to "Kōeidō". According to this scenario, around 1856, (Note: The specified year shifts slightly according to source. Shida (Shida (1941), p. 312) states that according to information given him by Kōeidō, the confection was created around 1853 (Kaei 6) and dubbed "Kibi dango" around 1855 (Ansei 2).) Takeda Hanzō (半蔵), the retired predecessor of the family ceramics shop, was one of the three Okayama townsmen who collectively devised the new recipe that was somehow an improvement over the steamed millet dumpling "rectangularly shaped like kakimochi, which did not keep well, and was eaten with red bean paste or with sauce poured on top," which was a common staple wherever the crop was harvested.

=== Wagashi references books ===
Contrary to this, a handful of desk references place "Kōeidō" already in existence at the time of c. 1856 invention, crediting the shop's first proprietor Takeda Asajirō (浅次郎) rather than the elder Hanzō for the recipe. These sources claim that the tea ceremony connoisseur named Igi Tadazumi, who was then senior advisor (karō) to the feudal lord of the local Okayama Castle (Ikeda clan), gave Asajirō crucial advise leading to the recipe innovation, and that the millet dumplings served at Kibitsu Shrine inspired hint.

But the time frame seems to be wrong. Asajirō himself wrote that during his watch, the kibi dango changed shape from the rectangular to round shapes, and this happened sometimes after the Meiji Era was ushered in (1868-). The tea ceremony expert in question, referred to in these sources as 伊木三猿斎 (Igi San'ensai) only called himself by this art name in his retirement, from 1869 to his death in 1886.

=== Detailed account by local historians ===
More meticulous accounts of what transpired, uncovered by the labors of local historians, suggest that indeed, several years passed between 1856 and the time Asajirō became successor to this business, changing the recipe.

A detailed chronology was stitched together by local historian Oka Chōhei based on articles in print and additionally conducted interviews, is as follows:

In the year 1855 (Ansei 2) three commoners from the town around Okayama Castle (now Okayama City) collaborated and devised a reddish rectangular confection rather like kakimochi as accompaniment to serving tea. Among the three was old man Hanryo (伴呂翁), resident of Furugyōchō and Karatsu ware peddling agent fronting for the samurai clan (myōdai). (Note: The 2nd man in the group was Shigaraki Sōsuke (信楽宗介), a resident of Takasagochō and also a myōdai merchant of Shigaraki ware, who also sold moxa of Mount Ibuki from the same Ōmi Province. The 3rd man in the party was a resident of Kamiyachō, the kyōka poet Sasano Ippō (笹野一方) whose art name was Higenaga or "longbeard") This old man Hanryo was the grandfather Takeda Hanzō (武田伴蔵), and a member of the Takeda family who later founded Kōeidō. This snack was for pastime purposes only and not meant for business, but since leaving it nameless did not seem fitting, they pondered until they struck up the idea of borrowing the province name and calling it Kibi-dan-go (吉備だん粉, きびだん粉) "Kibi dan powder", something of a nonce word. This much is given in an article by a Meiji era popular culture researcher, Beninoya Oiro (紅の家おいろ) entitled Kibidangokō (「きびだんご考」) "Thoughts on the kibi dango".

Although this dessert was initially only distributed among friends and family, it was eventually offered for sale and gained popularity. Takeda Hanzō (died in 1901 at age 81) then outfitted a shop named Sōkandō (相歓堂) after his own art name, and had his mistress sell the Kibi-dan-go. (Note: Oka obtained the intelligence word-of-mouth from Fukuda Umeko (福田梅子) that this Sōkandō was named after Takeda Hanzō Hideharu X (十代目武田伴蔵秀治) and that it was run by his mistress .) Although Oka also heard dissenting reports that this Kibi-dan-go was millet dumpling with a "rather long thin thread of red bean paste poured over it," he was skeptical, and concluded it was in fact "probably kakimochi". (Note: Oka opined that an (ordinary) dumpling made entirely of millet was neither merchandizable nor suitable as souvenir. He has also read a draft for an ad for Sōkandō written by Fujiwara no Tadatomo (藤原忠朝) (d. 1893) which also convinced him it was kakimochi.) After Hanzō's mistress died, the Sōkandō business was passed over to Hanzō's relative Takeda Asajirō, the founder of Kōeidō.

It was not until Takeda Asajirō's takeover that the merchandise became the present-day soft gyūhi product packed in boxes, according to the memory of Nishio Kichitaro, founder of the Sanyō Shimpō, for many years the only newspaper of the area. Asajirō's own book too states that it was only after the Meiji Restoration (1867-) that his product changed from the rectangular items of the past to the round cakes the size of two go stones, sold in boxed in sets of 30 or 50.

In 1885 (Meiji 18) Kōeidō's Kibi dango was presented to Emperor Meiji who was visiting the area, and he wrote a waka poem praising it, which translated to "Kibi dango such that no two such exists in Japan / Indeed such is the taste and it has earned its name, this". The sellers subsequently began to enclose leaflets with this poem printed inside its boxes.

== Pre-history relating to Kibitsu Shrine ==
There are a number of sources attempting to trace the pre-history of the Kibi dango to some food, or custom, or legend associated with Okayama's Kibitsu Shrine, though each line of inquiry differs from one another.

As aforestated, there had been a piece of anecdote or rumor (perhaps collected in the Meiji era), claiming that the Kibi dango recipe was created on suggestion of former feudal advisor Igi San'ensai, and that he used the millet dumplings served at Kibitsu Shrine as hint.

The founder of Kōeido (the purveyors of Kibi dango) authored a travel guide in 1895, in which he claimed that Kibitsuhiko rolled with his own hand some kibi dango to give to Emperor Jimmu who stopped at Takayama Palace in Okayama. This episode is anachronistic and hence faulty, (Note: Prince Kibitsuhiko in life was an 8th generation descendant and unborn during the time of Jimmu.) but illustrates that the manufacturer was attempting to associate their product with this deity at a relatively early juncture.

From modern academia, one theory notes that Japanese shrines have a custom called naorai (御直会) whereby food offerings to the resident deity would afterwards be consumed. Kibitsu Shrine observed this custom in the early Edo Period, and this was the origin of the Kibi dango, according to Okayama University professor Taniguchi Sumio in his book on the history of the prefecture.

On the other hand, Fujii Shun (藤井駿), also of Okayama University, who had the ancestral line of the shrine's priests (kannushi) in his family background, conjectured that the sweet was an adaptation of the Miyauchi ame (宮内飴), a specialty of the Miyauchi and Itakura hamlets in the neighborhood of Kibitsu Shrine (i.e., the community served by Bitchū-Takamatsu Station) which is in the environs of the shrine. (Note: Fujii cites two sources that refer to the Miauchi ame: Ishii Ryōsetsu aka Nonaka Kōin (石井了節 / 野中好胤) (1753), Bitchū shūseishi (『備中集成志』) "Collected history of Bitchū Province" and Kobayashi Takayoshi (小林孝義) (1860), Bitchū ōrai (『備中往来』), a guidebook, meant to be used as a reader for terakoya schools.)

== Sino- and Russo-Japanese Wars ==
Kōeidō's Kibi dango's national fame came after the private San'yō Railway came into operation through its city. This new line connected the Kobe (which was the terminus of the state-run line) to Okayama in 1891, and extended the line to Hiroshima just before the Sino-Japanese War broke out in 1894. Since the Daihonei (Imperial General Headquarters) was located in Hiroshima, all the troops were amassed here and shipped in and out of Ujina Harbor (宇品港) (Hiroshima Harbor). Those residing farther east and serving the war by necessity rode the San'yō line, and passed the Okayama station in transit. Kōeidō, which been peddling their goods in Okayama Station now expanded business to the Hiroshima Station, and capitalized on the soldiers and send-off parties buying the Kibi dango as souvenirs.

It was at this time that Kōeidō began its marketing strategy connecting its product to "Peach Boy". Reputedly, proprietor Takeda Asajirō himself dressed up as Momotarō and held up the "Nippon-ichi (number one in Japan)" banner to pitch sales, and persons dressed up as oni ogre handed out leaflets. The peddling at the station was so successful, that a lady from Yamawaki (Sangetsudō), who also had Takeda Hanzō connections, was recruited to help. By April 1897 (Meiji 30), there were 12 establishments that billed themselves as the "original" (honbo, honke, ganso) Kibi dango sellers.

A 1901 article by folk historian Mizunoya Takashige [?] (水の家隆成) stated that while "Kōeidō used millet, mochi, and sugar as ingredients, Sangetsudō used mochi and sugar," and that Sangetsudō stressed the fact they did not use millet and was different item than "Japan's number one kibi dango."

== Modern use ==
As already described, during the Meiji Era, the Kibi dango business had already appropriated the "number one" slogan from the Peach Boy folktale, and was using the hero's costume to promote sales. But eventually, the entire Okayama prefecture began to promote the Kibi dango and Momotarō as inextricably connected part of their prefectural heritage. This was mostly a post-World War II phenomenon, Okayama had not been the foremost contender as the home of the Peach Boy (Inuyama, Aichi and Kinashi in Takamatsu on Shikoku previously laying strong claims). However, that changed with the advent of amateur ethnographer Nanba Kinnosuke (難波金之助) (1897–1973), Momotarō no Shijitsu (桃太郎の史実) ("The True History of Momotarō," 1930), which claimed that the Momotarō folktale was an adaption of legend Kibitsuhiko no Mikoto no Ura Taiji, which recounts Kibitsuhiko's suppression of a local oni (ogre) named Ura. This ogre-slayer Kibitsuhiko, as his name suggests, is the deified being venerated in Kibitsu Shrine, Okayama.

Nowadays, the Momotarō theme is used in train station advertisement, as well as being found in packaging of the kibi dango products. Since 1993, the Kōeidō Honten has sold the "Ganso Kibidango", featuring Momotarō character design by children's book illustrator Tarō Gomi.

An assortment of varieties has been developed, such as mascatto kibi dango (Muscat grape syrup filling), momo kibi dango (white peach syrup filling), kinako kibi dango (sprinkled with kinako or dry soybean powder), and chocolate flavored varieties.

== See also ==
- Doraemon (comic) – Momotaro brand kibidango is one of the Secret Tools
- Kibitsuhiko-no-mikoto
- List of dumplings
- Momotarō
- Nipponichi kibi dango
- Ōte manjū – another Okayama city confection
- Proso millet
