= Momotarō =

Popular hero of Japanese folklore

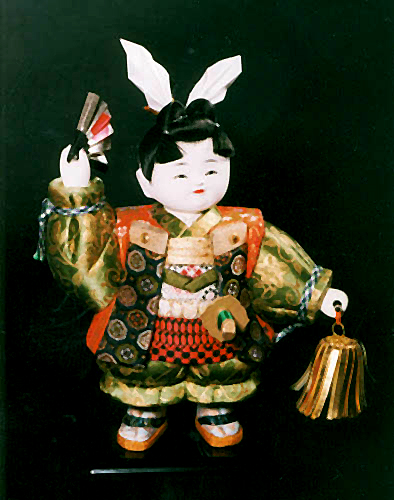
- A bisque doll of Momotarō

In-universe information
- Gender: Male
- Origin: Japan
- Nationality: Japanese

Momotarō (桃太郎; Japanese pronunciation: [momoꜜtaɾoː], lit. 'Peach Boy') is a popular hero of Japanese folklore. His name is often translated as Peach Boy, but is directly translated as Peach + Tarō, a common Japanese given name. Momotarō is also the title of various books, films and other works that portray the tale of this hero.

There is a popular notion that Momotarō is a local hero of Okayama Prefecture, but this claim was invented in the modern era. This notion is not accepted as consensus in scholarly circles.

== Story ==
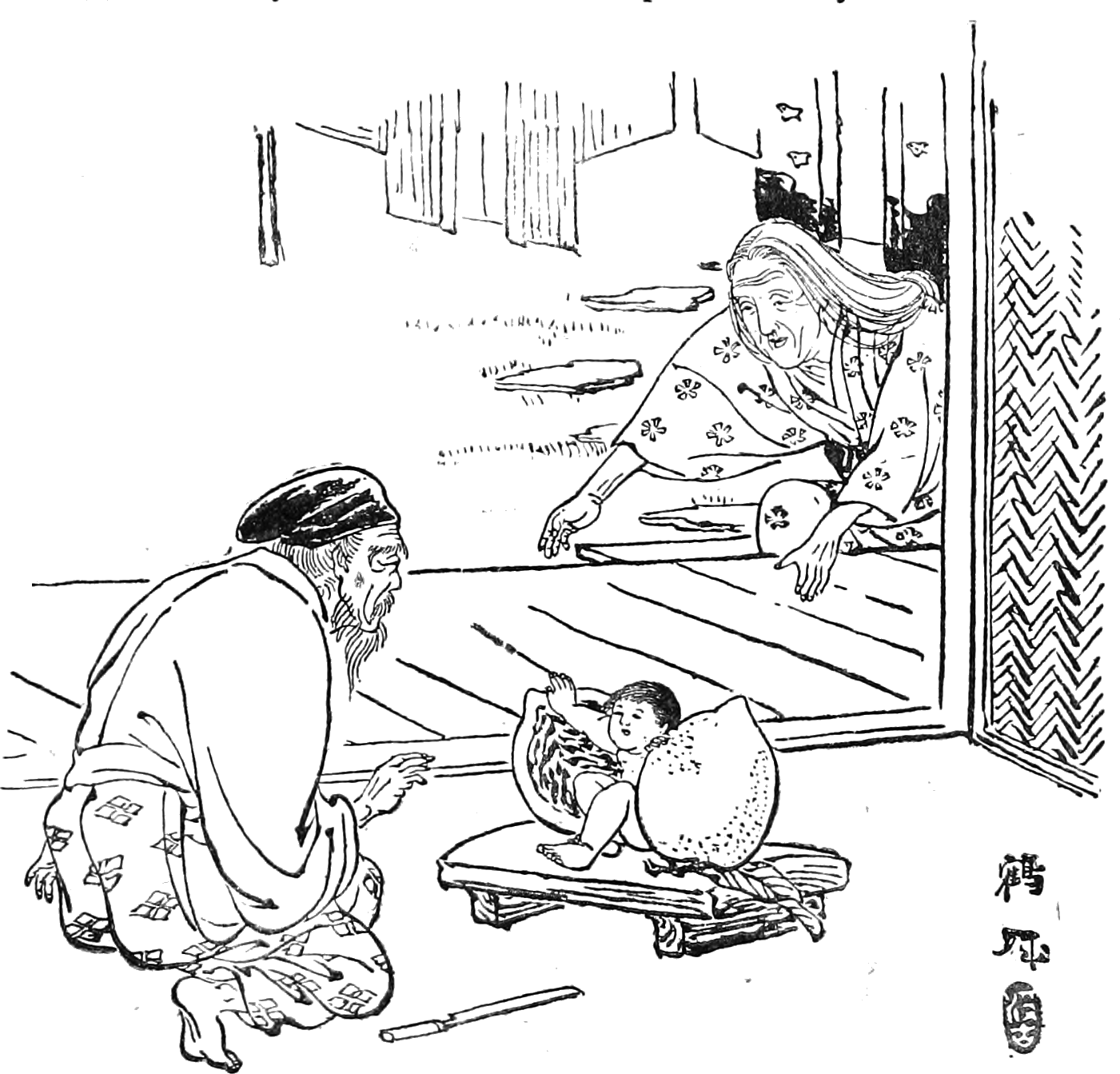
Momotarō coming out of a peach

The present conventional form of the tale (Standard Type) can be summarized as follows:

Momotarō was born from a giant peach, which was found floating down a river by an old, childless woman who was washing clothes there. The woman and her husband discovered the child when they tried to open the peach to eat it. The child explained that he had been bestowed by the gods to be their son. The couple named him Momotarō, from momo (peach) and tarō (eldest son in the family). When he was just five years old, he was able to cut a big tree with just an old knife.

When he matured into adolescence, Momotarō left his parents to fight a band of Oni (demons or ogres) who marauded over their land, by seeking them out in the distant island where they dwelled (a place called Onigashima or "Demon Island"). En route, Momotarō met and befriended a talking dog, monkey and pheasant, who agreed to help him in his quest in exchange for a portion of his rations (kibi dango or "millet dumplings"). At the island, Momotarō and his animal friends penetrated the demons' fort and beat the band of demons into surrendering. Momotarō and his new friends returned home with the demons' plundered treasure and the demon chief as a captive.

This Standard Type of "Momotarō" was defined and popularized due to them being printed in school textbooks during the Meiji Period.

This is the result of development of the literary "Momotarō", which had been handwritten and printed since the early Edo period into Meiji. One significant change is that in most examples of Edo Period literature, Momotarō was not born from a peach, but born naturally to the elderly couple who ate the peach and regained their youth. Such subtypes are classed as kaishun-gata (回春型) "rejuvenation" type, whereas the now conventional subtypes are termed kasei-gata (果生型) "birth from the fruit" type.

== Development in literature ==
Although the oral version of the story may have emerged during the Muromachi period (1392–1573), it may not have been set down in writing until the Edo period (1603–1867). The oldest works of Momotaro known to have existed had been dated to the Genroku era (1688–1704) or perhaps earlier.

=== Edo period ===
These older texts from around the Genroku era (e.g. Momotarō mukashigatari) are lost, but surviving examples of later dates, such as the reprint Saihan Momotarō mukashigatari (c. 1777 (Note: An undated copy exists, but is probably nearly coeval with a second copy dated An'ei6 or 1777.)) purportedly preserve the older tradition, and form the first (most primitive) group of texts according to Koike Tōgorō. The late date of the reprint has sometimes caused it to be classed as kibyōshi ("yellow cover" book, directed primarily at an adult audience) or later type of kusazōshi literature (intended for a more general audience, including women and children), but it should properly be classed as akahon ("red book") or early type. (Note: The original print must have been produced in the akahon era. The reprint bears the illustrator's name "Nishimura Shigenobu" which was the name this artist used early in his career, from Kyōhō 16/1731 to c. Enkyō 4/1747.) (Note: Kumooka's paper also calls it an akahon)

A second group of texts, which Koike considered to be younger, includes the miniature akahon, Momotarō (『もゝ太郎』), printed in Kyōhō 8 (1723). (Note: The title uses the Japanese ditto mark "ゝ".) This miniature book is now considered to be the oldest surviving copy of any written Momotarō story.

Whether belonging to the first or second groups, texts from the Edo Period generally follow the same general plot as the modern standard versions but exhibit certain differences in detail.

==== Dumpling, kindling, animals ====
Momotarō is not supplied with kibi dango ("millet dumplings"), but rather with tō dango (とう団子) and other treats in the oldest Genroku era texts and the first group. In the first group, the old man goes out to cut grass, rather than to cut kindling. The same three companion beasts (pheasant, monkey, then dog) appear in both groups, but in a different order. Though the order of the animals is not significant to the story, the most common order that appear is the dog, the monkey, and then the pheasant. In nearly every variation, all three animal companions agree to help Momotarō in exchange for a portion of his food. In one variation from the Edo Period, the dog is given half a portion, the monkey willingly comes, and Momotarō threatens the pheasant.

==== Birth from peach ====
As noted above, in most of the Edo Period books, Momotarō is not born from a peach but from the woman who consumes a peach and grows years younger in age. Both the first and second groups consist entirely of "rejuvenation" types. The "birth from the peach" type examples (such as the version in Takizawa Bakin's 1811 essay Enseki zasshi "Swallowstone Miscellany") are found among tales that have deviated further, which Koike assigns to a third group of texts. While "birth from the peach" version has not been confirmed in earlier written texts from the Edo Period, one tantalizing sculpture dating to 1614 depicted a man standing in the middle of a split peach. This purported Momotarō carving at Kehi Shrine in Tsuruga, Fukui, was lost during the air raids of 1945. (Note: Koike thought it looked like an old man riding a peach like a boat, and that it could not be conclusively connected to Momotarō.)

==== Momotarō's age ====
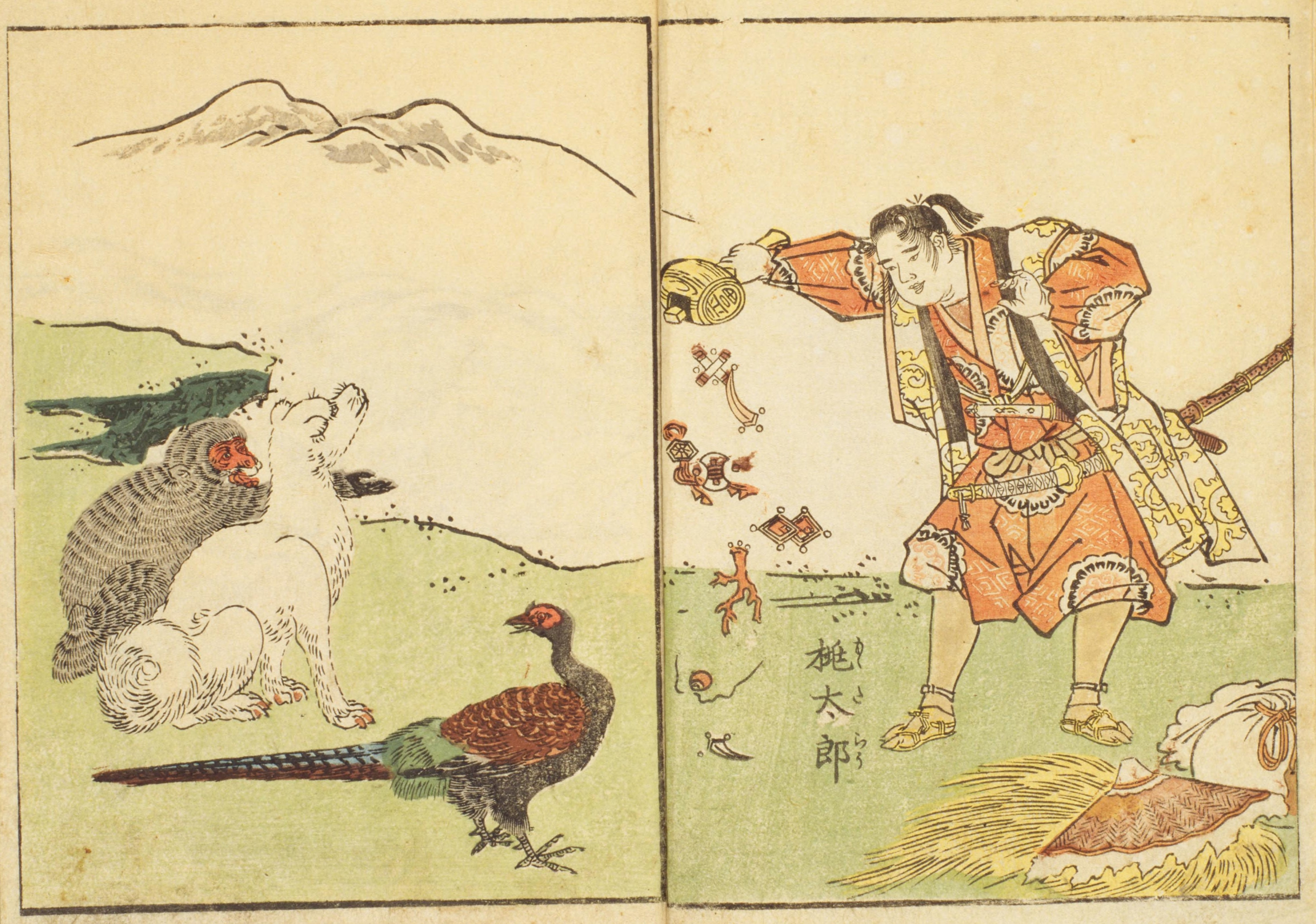
Momotaro swinging the magic mallet (uchide no kozuchi), with his animal companions. ―Santō-an Kyōden (Santō Kyōden). Ehon takara no nanakusa (1804)

It was noted that the protagonist Momotarō was being drawn progressively younger by artists over the years. In one subjective estimation, Momotarō appeared approximately 30 until c. 1735, 25 up to c. 1800, and 20 until the end of Edo Period in 1867.

Not every text specifies age, but in the version in Kamo no Norikiyo (賀茂規清) (1798–1861)'s Hina no Ukegi (雛迺宇計木) Momotarō's was 15 years and 6 months when he set out on his expedition. (Note: East Asian age reckoning applies, so it really means June in the year he turned or will turn 15.) And in Momotarō takara no kurairi (c. 1830–1840), Momotarō was aged sixteen. The Momotarō in Iwaya Sazanami's version of 1894 was of similar age (15 years old) when he resolved to go to devil island. (Note: The Momotarō illustrated in this work appeared 18 or 19 years old to Koike.)

Researcher Namekawa Michio also noticed the trend of Momotarō being depicted younger and younger, and he dubbed the phenomenon "tendency of age diminishment" (低年齢化傾向, teinenreika keikō).

=== Meiji period ===
After Japan abandoned the feudal system and entered the Meiji era, Iwaya Sazanami became a seminal figure in how the Momotaro story was shaped and became familiarized to the Japanese populace. Sazanami was the author of the Momotaro tales in his commercially successful folktale collections, and also a major contributor to the textbook versions.

The "Momotarō" tale was first incorporated into nationalized textbooks for elementary schools by the Meiji government in 1887. (Note: Torigoe (1983), p. 3, cited by Hori in English.) It was subsequently omitted from the 1st edition of the National Language Reader or Kokugo tokuhon but reappeared from the 2nd edition onward to the 5th edition. It has been generally accepted that the 2nd edition reader of 1910 was de facto written by storybook author Iwaya Sazanami, who had joined the Ministry of Education as nonpermanent staff in 1906.

Iwaya had already published a version of "Momotaro" (1894) for his Nihon mukashibanashi (Japanese Folktales), where Momotaro is cast as a military soldier or commander (shōgun) of Great Japan (Dainihon), dispatched on a punitive campaign to quell the ogres who live in the northeast. Older texts took the punishing of oni for granted and dispensed with explaining what crimes the oni committed to deserve condemnation. But in Iwaya's version, the ogres were explicitly stated as being evil beings, who devoured the "poor people" and taken "plunder" from the Emperor's land of Japan (Ozaki's translation), thus morally justifying Momotaro's expedition. It has been suggested these ogres represented the Qing dynasty of China since the publication occurred in 1895, which saw the outbreak of the Sino-Japanese War.

=== Taishō and Shōwa eras ===
From the 3rd edition National Language Reader (1918–1932) onwards (until the end of World War II), "Momotaro" has occupied the spot of the last tale in Book 1 of these nationalized elementary textbook series. Teachers in essays submitted in 1917 stated that the perception of the Momotaro tale was shifting, so that they were seen as containing lessons of assertiveness and helping in the material advancement of one's country. There was criticism from the liberalism side, for example, the novelist Yamamoto Yūzō (1925) protesting that the oni were being punished for no apparent reason, and is "tantamount to telling [children] to think of foreigners as oni".

In the early Shōwa era, after Emperor Hirohito assumed the throne, Momotarō continued to be used to instill patriotism (or the teachings of the Rescript on Education) in pupils with the 4th edition National Language Reader (1933–1938) which begins with the picture of the cherry blossom. The "Momotarō" of the 4th edition was modified so that the oni now stated "We will no longer torment the people nor take things. Please spare our lives", and forfeits their treasures out of their own volition, thus addressing the foregoing issues (i.e., Momotarō accused of attacking oni for no legitimate reason).

The use of Momotarō in wartime propaganda against the U.S. and its Allies was discussed extensively by John W. Dower in his book War Without Mercy (1986). Dower is credited with coining the term "Momotarō paradigm" in this respect. Momotarō disappeared from Japanese textbooks at the end of World War II.

== Oral variants ==
The story has some regional variations in oral telling.

In some variants, a red and white box are seen floating down the river, and when the red box is chosen to be recovered, Momotarō is found inside. These may be a red box and a black box, or the box may contain a peach inside. These types are often seen in the northern parts of Japan (Tōhoku and Hokuriku regions).

Or Momotarō may exhibit the characteristic of the lazy protagonist in the Netarō "Sleeping Boy" stories. These subtypes have been collected mainly in the Shikoku and Chūgoku regions.

There are variances about the Momotarō's process of growth; one is that he grew up to meet the expectation of the old couple. Another is that he grew up to be a strong but lazy person who slept all day and did not do anything. It is possible that the version of Momotarō that grows up to meet the expectations of the old couple was made more famous to give lessons to children. Nowadays, Momotarō is one of the most famous characters in Japan, as an ideal model for young children for his kind-heartedness, bravery, power, and care for his parents.

Grown up, Momotarō goes on his journey to defeat the demons when he hears about the demons of the Onigashima (demon island). In some versions of the story, Momotarō volunteered to go help the people by repelling the demons, but in some stories he was forced by the townspeople or others to go on a journey. However, all the stories describe Momotarō defeating the Oni and living 'happily ever after' with the old couple.

== Claims as local hero ==
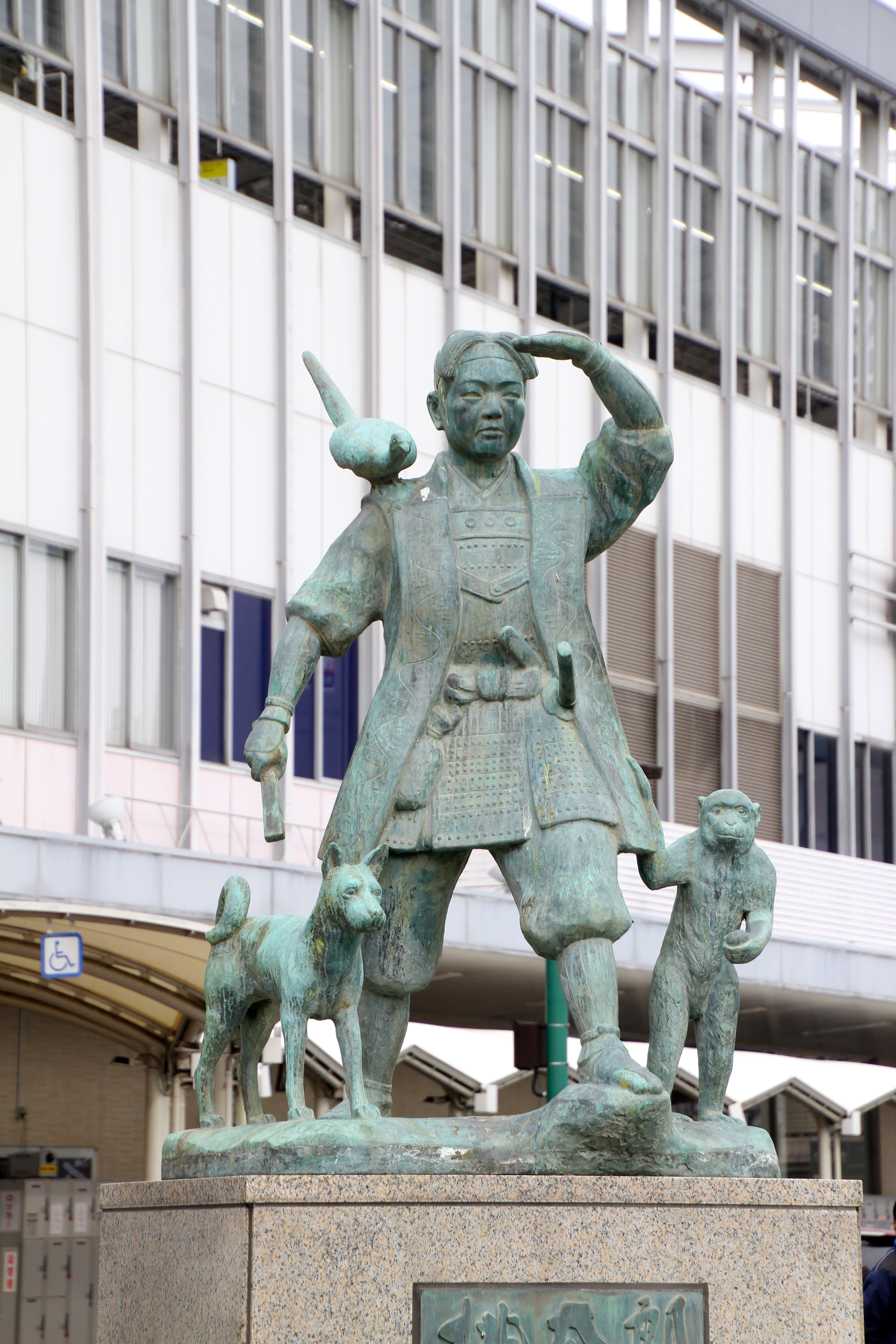
Momotaro Statue located at Okayama Station

Momotarō now enjoys popular association with Okayama City or its prefecture, but this association was only created in the modern era. The publication of a book by Nanba Kinnosuke entitled Momotarō no Shijitsu (1930) for example helped the notion of Momotarō's origins in Okayama to gain wider familiarity. Still, even as late as the antebellum period before World War II (1941–1945), Okayama was considered only the third contender behind two other regions known as Momotarō's homeland.

The demon island (Onigashima (鬼ヶ島)) of the story is sometimes associated with Megijima Island, an island in the Seto Inland Sea near Takamatsu, due to the vast manmade caves found there.

Inuyama, Aichi has Momotarō Shrine with a legend associated with it. In the 1920s and 1930s, lyricist Ujō Noguchi wrote three "folk songs" for the locality alluding to the Momotaro legend. (Note: 《犬山音頭》《桃太郎音頭》《犬山節》 ("Inuyama ondo", "Momotarō ondo", "Inuyama bushi").)

== English translations ==
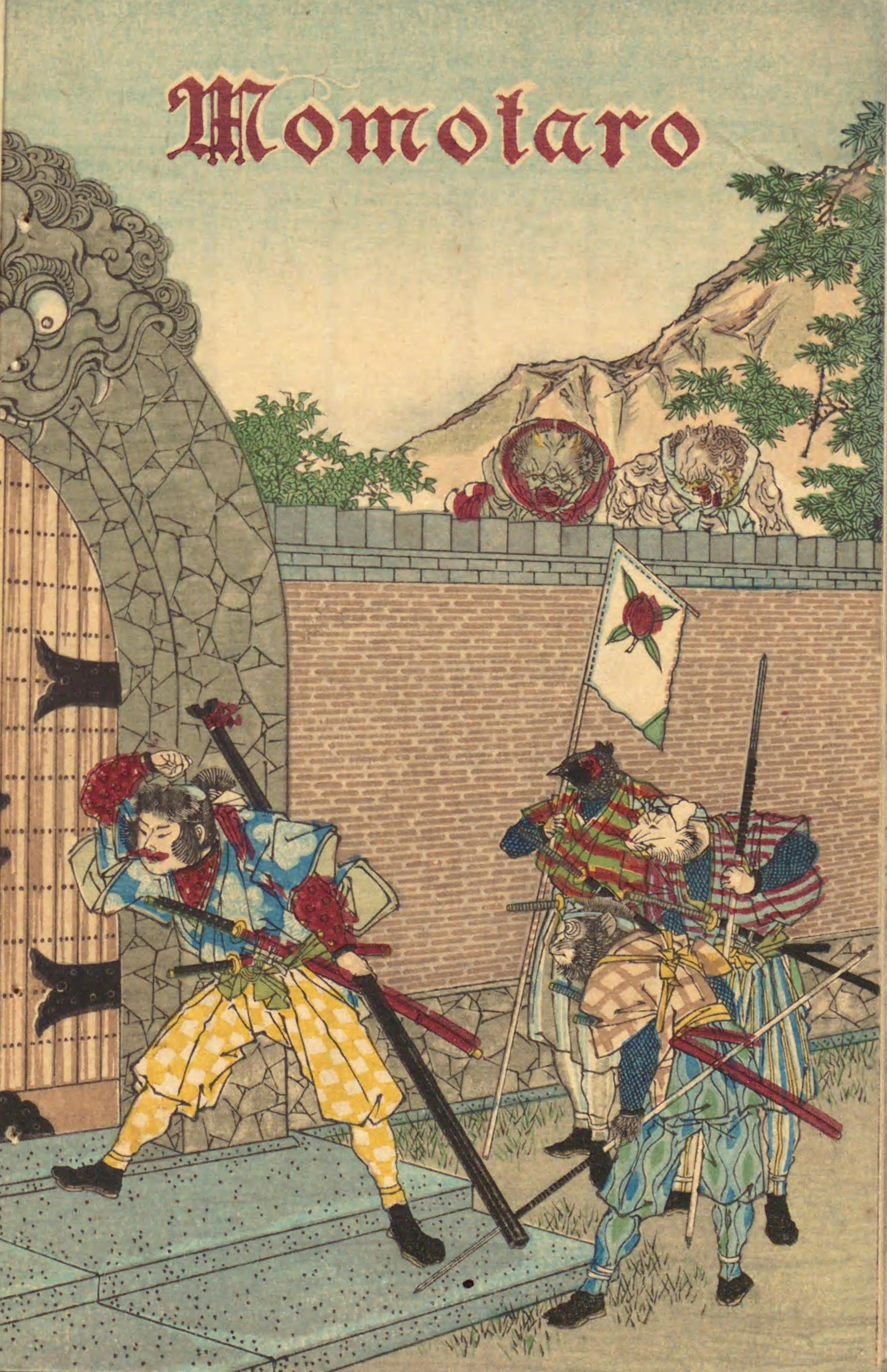
English Momotaro published by Hasegawa Takejirō's Kōbunsha (1885, 1st edition)

The story has been translated into English many times. "The Adventures of Little Peachling" appeared in A.B. Mitford's Tales of Old Japan in 1871. William Elliot Griffis published a version in 1880, which remained obscure even to researchers, even though English translations in subsequent decades apparently borrowed from Griffis's phraseology and use of idiom, sometimes even copying outright.

Rev. David Thompson's translation as "Little Peachling" appeared as the first volume of Hasegawa Takejirō's Japanese Fairy Tale series in 1885. A second edition appeared in 1886, with a different set of illustrations, drawn by Kobayashi Eitaku

Susan Ballard included the tale in Fairy Tales from Far Japan (1899).

Yei Theodora Ozaki included a loosely translated version in her Japanese Fairy Tales (1903); Ozaki's retellings were based on a version by "Sadanami sanjin" (sic., i.e., Sazanami Iwaya). Ozaki was credited with spreading Japanese folktales to the English-speaking nations by researchers such as Teiji Seta. (Note: Seta is well-known as the Japanese translator of J. R. R. Tolkien novels.)

There was another English translation that used the same source as Ozaki and published around the same time, namely, "The Story of Peach-Boy" in Iwaya's Fairy Tales of Old Japan (1903, repub. 1914) translated by Hannah Riddell. (Note: The bilingual 1903 edition was published by Eigaku-shimpo-sha, in 12 volumes. In 1914, the English translations were bound together as "12 parts in 1 vol".) The translation of the collection was a collaborative effort with other translators, such as Fanny B. Greene, Tsuda Umeko and others. This latter effort was acknowledged by Iwaya himself.

Teresa Peirce Williston in her Japanese Fairy Tales, Second Series, in 1911.

The tale was translated as Peach-Prince and the Demons and included in the compilation Fairy stories my children love best of all, although the compiler did not indicate its Japanese origin.

== Momotarō's Song ==
The popular children's song about Momotarō titled Momotarō-san no Uta (Momotarō's Song) was first published in 1911; the text's author is unattributed, while the melody was written by Teiichi Okano. The first two stanzas, with romanization and translation, are given below.

Momotarō's song

"Momotarō-san no uta"	桃太郎さんの歌	"Momotarō's Song"
Momotarō-san, Momotarō-san	桃太郎さん、桃太郎さん	Momotarō, Momotarō
Okoshi ni tsuketa kibidango	お腰につけたきびだんご	Those millet dumplings on your waist
Hitotsu watashi ni kudasai na?	一つ私に下さいな！	Won't you give me one?
Yarimashō, yarimashō	やりましょう、やりましょう	I'll give you one, I'll give you one
Kore kara oni no seibatsu ni	これから鬼の征伐に	If you'll come with me on a quest to conquer the oni
Tsuite ikunara agemashō!	ついて行くならあげましょう	I'll give you one

== As war propaganda icon ==
Portrayal of Momotarō as a soldier in the Japanese Imperial Army fighting hostile nations was already happening by the (First) Sino-Japanese War (1894–1895). The Momotaro tale was altered by Iwaya Sazanami in 1894 so that the oni lived to the northeast of Japan, a thinly veiled reference to Qing China given the then current geopolitics. Iwaya was not purely a major figure in children's literature, but a government official working as the head of the editorial bureau of the Ministry of Education, since 1878. Iwaya would later pen a whole book of essay on the use of Momotaro as an instructional tool, Momotarō-shugi no kyōiku ("the Education Theory Based on Principles in Momotaro", 1915).

Comic images picturing Momotarō defending Japan against Oni representing Russian "Northern Devils" were given out during the 1904–1905 Russo-Japanese War.

Momotarō was an immensely popular figure in Japan during World War II, appearing in many wartime films and cartoons. Momotarō represented the Japanese government, and the enemy states, namely the Allies, later including the United States was symbolized by the oni, the demonic figure. One wartime film, in which Momotarō and his animals mount on a military operation for the Japanese Armed Forces (against the British) is Momotarō's Divine Sea Warriors.

== In modern times ==
A figure of Momotarō is currently also associated with Momotaro Jeans company from the city Kojima in Okayama Prefecture, specializing in japanese selvedge denim.

== See also ==
- Kibi dango (millet dumpling)
- Kintarō
- Urashima Tarō
- Uriko-hime
- Pecharunt, Okidogi, Munkidori, Fezandipiti and Ogerpon - Pokémon that are inspired by the legend of Momotarō.
