= Humanity Declaration =

1946 announcement by Japanese Emperor Hirohito

The Humanity Declaration (人間宣言, Ningen-sengen), also known as the Imperial Rescript on the Construction of a New Japan (新日本建設に関する詔書, Shin Nippon Kensetsu ni Kan suru Shōsho), is an imperial rescript issued by Hirohito, the emperor of Japan, as part of a New Year address on 1 January 1946 at the request of the Supreme Commander for the Allied Powers. In the rescript, which started with his citation of the Five Charter Oath of 1868, the Emperor denied the concept of his divinity, which would eventually lead to the promulgation of the new Constitution, under which the Emperor is "the symbol of the State and of the unity of the people".

== The Declaration ==
Delivery of this rescript was to be one of the Emperor's last acts as the imperial Sovereign. The Supreme Commander Allied Powers and the Western world in general gave great attention to the following passage towards the end of the rescript:

朕󠄁ト爾等國民トノ間ノ紐帶ハ、終󠄁始相互ノ信賴ト敬愛トニ依リテ結バレ、單ナル神󠄀話ト傳說トニ依リテ生ゼルモノニ非ズ。天皇ヲ以テ現御神󠄀トシ、且日本國民ヲ以テ他ノ民族ニ優越セル民族ニシテ、延テ世界ヲ支配スベキ運󠄁命ヲ有ストノ架空ナル觀念ニ基クモノニモ非ズ

— 『新日本建設に関する詔書』より抜粋

The ties between Us and Our people have always stood upon mutual trust and affection. They do not depend upon mere legends and myths. They are not predicated on the false conception that the Emperor is divine, and that the Japanese people are superior to other races and fated to rule the world.

— Official translation of the Declaration

This first draft of this rescript is said to have been drafted by Japanese cultural scholars Reginald Horace Blyth and Harold Gould Henderson, who also contributed to the popularisation of Zen and the poetic form of haiku outside Japan.

== Interpretation ==
The exact meaning of this text, which was published in archaic Japanese, has been the subject of considerable debate. In particular, in the passage of the declaration which was officially translated as "false conception according to which the emperor is divine", the unusual term akitsumikami (現御神) was used instead of the more common word arahitogami (現人神, "living god") Ara means "exist" or "appear", hito means "person" and kami means "god". The word arahitogami was first mentioned in the Nihon Shoki (c. 720), where the legendary Japanese prince Yamato Takeru said "I am the son of an Arahitokami."

=== Western view ===
According to the popular Western view, promoted by the Supreme Commander of the Allied Powers, the rescript challenged the centuries-old claim that the Japanese emperor and his predecessors were descendants of the sun goddess Amaterasu, and thus the Emperor had now publicly admitted that he was not a living god. Thus, the same day as the rescript was issued, General Douglas MacArthur announced that he was very much pleased with the Emperor's statement, which he saw as his commitment to lead his people in the democratisation of Japan.

Although akitsumikami is often translated as "divine" or "divinity", some Western scholars (including John W. Dower and Herbert P. Bix) have pointed out that its real meaning is "manifest kami" (or, more generally, "incarnation of a god"), and that therefore the emperor would still be, according to the declaration, an arahitogami ("living god"), although not an akitsumikami ("manifest kami"). In fact, Jean Herbert explains that, according to the Japanese tradition, the figure of the emperor would be "the extension in time" of the goddess Amaterasu and the previous emperors, representing a privileged moment in eternity. This was held as evidence of the emperor's divine origin.

=== Japanese view ===
On 1 January 1946, the rescript was reported on the front page of many major newspapers. The Asahi Shimbun headline was "New year's day rescript paves way for peace and progress for the people as Emperor laments confusion of ideals." (Note: Japanese text: 年頭、国運振興の詔書渙発 平和に徹し民生向上、思想の混乱を御軫念.) The Mainichi Shimbun headline was, "Rescript presented in the new year: The bonds of society are trust, respect, the Emperor, and the People." (Note: Japanese text: 新年に詔書を賜ふ 紐帯は信頼と敬愛、朕、国民と供にあり.) The newspaper headlines did not mention divinity, only that peace and the emperor were with the people. The emperor's refutation of divinity was not valuable as news.

Critics of the Western interpretation, including Emperor Shōwa himself, argue that the repudiation of divinity was not the point of the rescript. Some argue that since this rescript starts with a full quote from the Five Charter Oath of 1868 by Emperor Meiji, the Emperor's true intention was that Japan had already been democratic since the Meiji Era and was not democratized by the occupiers. As was clarified in a press interview on 23 August 1977, the Emperor wanted the Japanese people not to forget pride in Japan. This interpretation is supported by the fact that the imperial rescript was published with a commentary by Prime Minister Kijūrō Shidehara that dwelt exclusively on the prior existence of democracy in the Meiji Era and did not make even passing reference to the emperor's "renunciation of divinity."

Emperor Shōwa was persistent in the idea that the emperor of Japan should be considered a descendant of the gods. In December 1945, he told his vice-grand chamberlain Michio Kinoshita: "It is permissible to say that the idea that the Japanese are descendants of the gods is a false conception; but it is absolutely impermissible to call chimerical the idea that the emperor is a descendant of the gods." Shinto officials and right-wing groups throughout Japan today do not recognize the declaration as admitting that the emperor and country are not divine.

The English rescript was discovered in 2005 and was published in the Mainichi Shimbun on 1 January 2006. Professor Osamu Watanabe sent the following comments to the newspaper:

The material is very valuable because it allows you to compare and examine a series of steps from draft to rescript. In the rescript, the connection between phrases is poor and the subject is difficult to understand, but the draft is understood to focus on the denial of the emperor's deity. This is probably because the Japanese side swapped the front and back or added new ones to the draft.

— Osamu Watanabe (Professor, Hitotsubashi University Graduate School, Political History), Mainichi Shimbun, 1 January 2006

The Minister of Education, Culture, Sports, Science and Technology, Maeda Tamon, along with Gakushuin University director Katsunoshin Yamanashi and Prime Minister Kijūrō Shidehara, are key figures in Japan who have read and examined the draft of the Humanity Declaration. Maeda was also a Quaker and, like many Japanese Christians, revered the emperor. In December 1945, he answered in a question and answer session of the Imperial Diet that "the emperor is a god". "It is not a god of Western concept, but 'in the sense that it is the highest level in the world in the traditional Japanese concept' is a god", he replied.

== See also ==
- Occupation of Japan
- State Shinto
