= Hellfire: A Journey from Hiroshima =

1986 film

- Directed by: Michael Camerini; John Junkerman; James MacDonald
- Written by: John Junkerman
- Produced by: John W. Dower; John Junkerman
- Cinematography: Michael Camerini
- Distributed by: First Run Features
- Release date: 1986
- Running time: 58 minutes
- Country: United States
- Language: English

Hellfire: A Journey from Hiroshima is a 1986 American documentary film directed by John Junkerman. It was nominated for an Academy Award for Best Documentary Feature.
