= Charter Oath =

First constitution of modern Japan, promulgated 1868

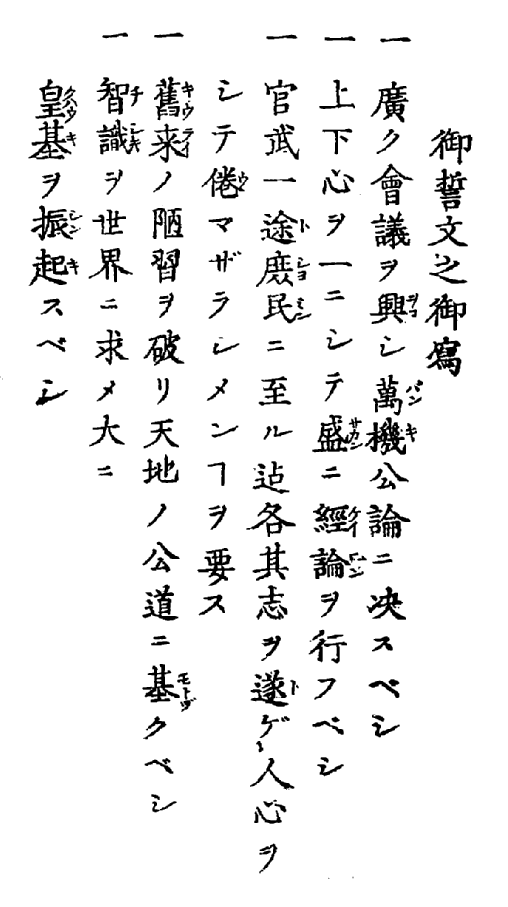
The Charter Oath as officially published.

The Charter Oath (五ヶ條ノ御誓文, Gokajō no Goseimon; Shinjitai: 五箇条の御誓文; more literally, the Oath in Five Articles) was promulgated on 6 April 1868 in Kyoto Imperial Palace. The Oath outlined the main aims and the course of action to be followed during Emperor Meiji's reign, setting the legal stage for Japan's modernization. This also set up a process of urbanization as people of all classes were free to move jobs, so many people moved to the city for better work prospects. It remained influential, though less for governing than inspiring, throughout the Meiji era and into the twentieth century, and it can be considered the first constitution of modern Japan.

== Rules ==
As the name implies, the text of the Oath consists of five clauses:

一廣ク會議ヲ興シ萬機公論ニ決スヘシ
一上下心ヲ一ニシテ盛ニ經綸ヲ行フヘシ
一官武一途庶民ニ至ル迄各其志ヲ遂ケ人心ヲシテ倦マサラシメン事ヲ要ス
一舊來ノ陋習ヲ破リ天地ノ公道ニ基クヘシ
一智識ヲ世界ニ求メ大ニ皇基ヲ振起スヘシ

Translation:

1. Deliberative assemblies shall be widely established and all matters decided by open discussion.
2. All classes, high and low, shall be united in vigorously carrying out the administration of affairs of state.
3. The common people, no less than the civil and military officials, shall all be allowed to pursue their own calling so that there may be no discontent.
4. Evil customs of the past shall be broken off and everything based upon the just laws of Nature.
5. Knowledge shall be sought throughout the world so as to strengthen the foundation of imperial rule.

— McLaren, p. 8, quoted in De Bary et al., p. 672.

== Origin and subsequent influence ==
The first draft of the Oath was written by junior councilor Yuri Kimimasa in January 1868, containing progressive language that spoke to the frustrations that the radical but modestly born Meiji leaders had experienced in "service to hereditary incompetents". Yuri's language was moderated by his colleague Fukuoka Takachika in February to be "less alarming", and Kido Takayoshi prepared the final form of the Oath, employing "language broad enough to embrace both readings". The Oath was read aloud by Sanjō Sanetomi in the main ceremonial hall of the Kyoto Imperial Palace in the presence of the Emperor and more than 400 officials. After the reading, the nobles and daimyōs present signed their names to a document praising the Oath, and swearing to do their utmost to uphold and implement it. Those not able to attend the formal reading afterwards visited the palace to sign their names, bringing the total number of signatures to 767.

The purpose of the oath was both to issue a statement of policy to be followed by the post-Tokugawa shogunate government in the Meiji period, and to offer hope of inclusion in the next regime to pro-Tokugawa domains. This second motivation was especially important in the early stages of the Restoration as a means to keep domains from joining the Tokugawa remnant in the Boshin War. Later, military victory "made it safe to begin to push court nobles and daimyō figureheads out of the way".

The promise of reform in the document initially went unfulfilled: in particular, a parliament with real power was not established until 1890, and the Meiji oligarchy from Satsuma, Chōshū, Tosa and Hizen retained political and military control well into the 20th century. In general, the Oath was purposely phrased in broad terms to minimize resistance from the daimyōs and to provide "a promise of gradualism and equity":

"Deliberative councils" and "public discourse" were, after all, terms that had been applied to cooperation between lords of great domains. That "all classes" were to unite indicated that there would continue to be classes. Even "commoners" were to be treated decently by "civil and military" officers, the privileged ranks of the recent past. No one was likely to be in favor of the retention of "evil customs"; a rather Confucian "Nature" would indicate the path to be chosen. Only in the promise to "seek knowledge throughout the world" was there a specific indication of change; but here, too, late Tokugawa activists had deplored the irrationality of Japan's two-headed government as the only one in the world. Moreover the search would be selective and purposeful, designed to "strengthen the foundations of imperial rule".

The Oath was reiterated as the first article of the constitution promulgated in June 1868, and the subsequent articles of that constitution expand the policies outlined in the Oath. Almost eighty years later, in the wake of the Second World War, Emperor Shōwa paid homage to the Oath and reaffirmed it as the basis of "national polity" in his Imperial Rescript on National Revitalization. The ostensible purpose of the rescript was to appease the American occupiers with a renunciation of imperial divinity, but the emperor himself saw it as a statement of the existence of democracy during the Meiji era.

== See also ==
- Five Public Notices
- Seventeen-article constitution
