= Five Public Notices =

The Five Public Notices (五榜の掲示, Gobō no keiji) were five officials bulletins posted on 7 April 1868 aimed at the common people, and which constituted the first decrees put out by the Meiji government of the Empire of Japan.

== Significance ==
The Charter Oath, which was released the day before the Five Public Notices, was simply shown to the kugyō and the daimyō and was decreed in the public journal of the daijō-kan on sale in cities. By contrast, the Five Public Notices were made public for nearly the entire country. The content of the notices continued the system of the Tokugawa shogunate, including policies such as observing loyalty to the monarchy and the head of one's family, and prohibitions on forming factions and on "the evil religion of Christianity". On the other hand, since the Meiji government was already in the process of ordering the scrapping of the feudal notice board system, the Five Public Notices symbolized the reach of the new government’s authority. For instance, because the Notices were not put up in the provinces allied with the Ōuetsu Reppan Dōmei, they were void at the same time as war broke out. Furthermore, the Notices were also not posted in the territories of the other daimyos and their vassals who were allies of the shogun.

On 24 February 1873 the feudal system of posting pronouncements on notice boards was abolished by Dajokan Proclamation No. 68 of the 6th year of Meiji and with it, the Five Public Notices were effectively repealed.

== Contents of the Five Public Notices ==
- Notice #1: Adherence to the five relationships of Confucianism
- Notice #2: Prohibition of conspiracy, presenting direct petitions, and abandoning one’s land to escape taxation
- Notice #3: Strict prohibition of Christianity
- Notice #4: Prohibition of injury to foreigners
- Notice #5: Ban on travel outside Japan

== See also ==
- Charter Oath
