= Herbert P. Bix =

American historian (born 1938)

Herbert Bix
- Born: 1938 (age 87–88); Boston, Massachusetts, United States
- Education: University of Massachusetts Amherst; Harvard University (PhD)
- Occupation: Historian
- Notable work: Hirohito and the Making of Modern Japan
- Awards: Pulitzer Prize for General Nonfiction (2001)

Herbert P. Bix (born 1938) is an American historian known for his scholarship and teaching on modern Japanese history and imperialism. His book Hirohito and the Making of Modern Japan, a biography of the Japanese Emperor, won the Pulitzer Prize for General Nonfiction in 2001, and was praised for revisionist arguments over the emperor's role in the Second Sino-Japanese War.

== Life and career ==
Bix was born in Boston and attended the University of Massachusetts Amherst as an undergraduate. After serving in the United States Navy and served a tour of duty in Japan, he earned the PhD in History and Far Eastern Languages from Harvard University during the American involvement in the Vietnam War, and, along with classmates such as John Dower, was a founding member of the Committee of Concerned Asian Scholars.

For several decades, he has explored modern and contemporary Japanese history in the United States and Japan. He has taught at many universities, including Hosei University in Japan in the years 1986 through 1990, and Hitotsubashi University in 2001. As of 2013, he became professor emeritus in History and Sociology at Binghamton University.

== Writings ==
The historical sociologist Jack Goldstone wrote in the journal Theory and Society that "Marxist history can be a stultifying maze of definitions and faceless classes," but Bix's Peasant Protest in Japan, 1590–1884 was "a superior Marxist history," that is, "a sensitive rendering of the actions of great masses of people, with attention to both the motives of exceptional individuals, and the context in which they act."

His second book, Hirohito and the Making of Modern Japan won the 2001 Pulitzer Prize for General Non-fiction. The Committee said the work was a "groundbreaking Biography" of the Japanese emperor Hirohito, who reigned in Japan from 1926 until his death in 1989. The Committee went on that, "supported by a vast array of previously untapped primary documents, Hirohito and the Making of Modern Japan is perhaps most illuminating in lifting the veil on the mythology surrounding the emperor's impact on the world stage." Bix was especially commended for his research on the Emperor's role in the Second Sino-Japanese War. Where a conventional view had seen the emperor as reluctant or passive, the Committee said Bix showed "Hirohito as he truly was: a man of strong will and real authority." Bix argues that the Emperor played a "strong decisive role" in all decisions, that after the war, when many called for abolition of the monarchy, General Douglas MacArthur justified its retention by "whitewashing" Hirohito's wartime role and used him as a "figurehead" to help convert Japan to a democracy. The 2000 General Nonfiction award had gone to John Dower, Bix's Harvard graduate school classmate, for his Embracing Defeat: Japan in the Wake of World War II, a study of the Occupation of Japan.

== Reactions and controversies ==
Critics, however, found fault with certain aspects. George Akita, for instance, a professor at the University of Hawa'ii, in a talk to the Asiatic Society of Japan said that the emperor's personal writings were almost non-existent, so Bix went beyond the documentary record to "imagine what the emperor could have thought, said, or meant". He used "guilt by association" to link Hirohito to Japanese fascism, but did not use sources that would support other conclusions. Further, Bix did not understand that primary sources could be untrustworthy or themselves intended to evade the truth. Akita conceded that the emperor was formally in charge, but that in practice he was not able to say "no" when his subordinates had come to a decision.

Akita and Bix had earlier clashed over the contributions of E.H. Norman, the Canadian scholar and diplomat whose study, Japan's Emergence as a Modern State: Political Problems of the Meiji Period, saw the merchant class as helping to bring about the Meiji Restoration. Akita criticized John Dower and others, for championing Norman, writing that his work was "based on hasty scholarship as well as on distortion of sources." Bix replied that Akita's charges were "emotional, extremely hostile to and contemptuous of its subject," and charges are "unwarranted or false in nearly every instance." He felt that Akita's "real target" was "critics of modernization theory." Akita went on to include Bix and John Dower in his study of modern Japan historiography, contending that their works "start with fixed premises and reach conclusions by deductions that a substantiated by the selective use of sources."

In 2003, Bix reviewed a conference volume dealing with the Nanjing Massacre in which the sinologist-historian Joshua Fogel found what he said were errors and exaggerations. He remarked that the problem "only opens progressive people everywhere to assault by rightwing revisionists who trawl about waiting for errors of this sort as a means of dismissing entire arguments altogether."

== Selected works ==
=== Selected articles ===
- Herbert P. Bix Links to articles in Asia-Pacific Journal: Japan Focus.
- —— (1978), "The Pitfalls of Scholastic Criticism: A Reply to Norman's Critics", Journal of Japanese Studies, 4 (2): 391–411, doi:10.2307/132031, JSTOR 132031
- —— (10 December 2003), "Remembering the Nanjing Massacre", Asia-Pacific Journal Japan Focus, 1 (12)
- "Hiroshima in History and Memory: A Symposium, Japan's Delayed Surrender: A Reinterpretation." Diplomatic History 19, no. 2 (1995): pp. 197–225.

=== Books ===
- Peasant Protest in Japan, 1590–1884. New Haven, Conn.: Yale University Press, 1986.
- Hirohito and the Making of Modern Japan. HarperCollins, 2000.

== References and further reading ==
- Akita, George (11 March 2003), Herbert Bix and his Hirohito: On the Use and Misuse of Sources, The Asiatic Society of Japan, archived from the original on 30 April 2016
- French, Howard W. (2000-09-12). "ARTS ABROAD; Out From the Shadows of the Imperial Mystique". New York Times.
- Fogel, Joshua A. (2003), "Response to Herbert P. Bix.", Asia-Pacific Journal, 1 (8), doi:10.1017/S1557466003031899
