= War Without Mercy =

1986 history book by John W. Dower

- Author: John W. Dower
- Language: English
- Genre: History
- Publisher: W. W. Norton & Co.
- Publication date: 1986
- Publication place: United States
- Media type: Print (hardcover)
- Pages: 399
- ISBN: 0-394-75172-8

War Without Mercy: Race & Power In the Pacific War is a 1986 history book written by John W. Dower and published by W. W. Norton & Company. The book covers the views of the Japanese and their Western adversaries during the Pacific War, with a particular focus on the United States.

== Overview ==
In War Without Mercy, Dower, emeritus professor at MIT, examines the Pacific Campaign in the Second World War through a racial lens. He argues that the fighting between the US and the Japanese be seen as a race war, as evidenced in "songs, slogans, propaganda reports, secret documents, Hollywood movies, the mass media and quotes from soldiers, leader and politicians".

Dower contrasts Western racism toward Japanese people with attitudes toward Germans/Nazis since in the US, Germans overall were differentiated from Nazis. He contends that that differentiation was not complete or perfect, but was still different from the attitudes toward the entire Japanese people. He points to the different kinds of treatment people of German and Japanese descent were treated with (internment in the case of Japanese-Americans versus overlooking the German American Bund's open support for Hitler right up to the declaration of war).

Dower instances examples of racism, and argues that such discourse and ideas can be easily re-established: "They [racist stereotypes] remain latent, capable of being revived by both sides in times of crisis and tension."

== Reception ==
While accepting some of the tenets of Dower's arguments, historians have also pushed back on some of his other points. For example, British journalist and historian Max Hastings argues that American views toward the Japanese accounted for little where aerial bombardment was concerned. Civilian populations in both Japan and Germany, he notes, were subjected to heavy Allied bombing raids in spite of the casualties war planners knew this would inflict.

== Sections ==
War Without Mercy is divided into four sections. The first section describes the patterns of a race war. The second and third part are a matched set: Part II covers the war from a Western viewpoint, while Part III relays the war as seen by Japanese eyes. Kitano says "The point-counterpoint scenario, as the two cultures misunderstand, misperceived, misinterpret and attempt to justify the destruction of each other is skillfully done." The final part is an epilogue, explaining how those intense viewpoints subsided, but may not have entirely disappeared.

== See also ==
- An Investigation of Global Policy with the Yamato Race as Nucleus

== Publication ==
- Dower, John W (1986). War Without Mercy: Race & Power In the Pacific War (1993 ed.). W. W. Norton & Co. pp. 317. ISBN 0-394-75172-8.Total pages: 399.
