= Embracing Defeat =

1999 history book by John W. Dower

- First edition cover
- Author: John W. Dower
- Language: English
- Genre: History
- Publisher: W.W. Norton & Co.
- Publication date: 1999
- Publication place: United States
- Media type: Print (hardcover)
- Pages: 676
- ISBN: 978-0-393-32027-5
- Preceded by: The Bombed: Hiroshima and Nagasaki in Japanese Memory, Diplomatic History 19, no. 2
- Followed by: Cultures of War: Pearl Harbor, Hiroshima, 9-11, Iraq

Embracing Defeat: Japan in the Wake of World War II is a history book written by John W. Dower and published by W. W. Norton & Company in 1999. The book covers the difficult social, economic, cultural and political situation of Japan in the aftermath of World War II and the nation's occupation by the Allies between August 1945 and April 1952, delving into topics such as the administration of Douglas MacArthur, the Tokyo war crimes trials, Hirohito's controversial Humanity Declaration and the drafting of the new Constitution of Japan.

== Reception ==
Described by The New York Times as "magisterial and beautifully written," the book won the 2000 Pulitzer Prize for General Nonfiction, the 1999 National Book Award, the 2000 Bancroft Prize,, the 1999 John K. Fairbank Prize, the 2000 L.L. Winship/PEN New England Award, the Mark Lynton History Prize and the 1999 Los Angeles Times Book Prize.

Steven Tolliday sees the book as a rare example of a book that shows the post-war years from a Japanese perspective, and writes that it is a "massively researched and beautifully illustrated book". Dower's writing is called "elegant, informative and easy to follow". Martyn Smith considers it to be "an outstanding account of US-Japan relations in the aftermath of the war and a useful guide to understanding the trans-national nature of Japan’s rise to economic superpower".

Michael Schaller noted that Dower "uses not only a rich array of period photographs but also art, comic books, poetry, letters, and journals from the 1940s to examine how the Japanese coped with hunger, homelessness, and despair in the wake of surrender. In the process, Dower delves into the technical and human dimensions of the black market, prostitution, the treatment of demobilized soldiers, the blossoming of literature despite a rigid and often mindless censorship that barred virtually any discussion of the nuclear bombs' impact, and the evolution of language to accommodate Japan's radically altered circumstances." J. A. A. Stockwin in his review for The New York Times calls it a "richly nuanced book" and writes that "Dower adopts a critical view of the occupation, but, interestingly, he is plainly enamored of the sheer democratic panache of that Constitution and of the largely -- though not wholly -- successful efforts of Government Section bureaucrats to prevent the Japanese Government from subtly undermining its key provisions".

== Publication ==
- Dower, John W (1999). Embracing defeat: Japan in the wake of World War II (2003 ed.). W.W. Norton & Co. ISBN 978-0-393-32027-5. Total pages: 676.

== See also ==
- Empire of Japan
- Japanese resistance during the Shōwa period
