= Noriko Kawamura =

History teacher

Noriko Kawamura teaches history at the Washington State University, where she specializes in military history, World War II in the Pacific, and the Cold War and holds the Arnold M. and Atsuko Craft Professor chair. Her most well-known work specialises in Hirohito who was the emperor of Japan between 1926 and 1989, and modern Japan.

== Education ==
Kawamura received a bachelor's degree from Keio University in Japan in 1978. She received her doctoral degree from the University of Washington in 1989, with major fields in American diplomatic history, Japanese-American relations, and modern Japan.

== Career ==
Kawamura has served as President of the Asian Studies on the Pacific Coast society.

== Works ==
Kawamura is currently working on a new book project on Emperor Hirohito's Cold War under contract with the University of Washington Press.

- Kawamura, Noriko. Emperor Hirohito and the Pacific War. Seattle; London: University of Washington Press, 2017. ISBN 9780295742731
- As editor, Building New Pathways to Peace. Seattle, WA: University of Washington Press, 2015. ISBN 0295996986
- Kawamura, Noriko. Turbulence in the Pacific Japanese-U.S. Relations During World War I. Westport, Conn: Praeger, 2000. OCLC 1200894120

== Honours & Awards ==
- Arnold M. and Atsuko Craft Professorship (College of Arts and Sciences, WSU, 2018-2021)
- Outstanding Achievement in International Activities (College of Arts and Sciences, WSU, 2016)
- Edward R. Meyer Project Grant (College of Arts and Sciences, WSU, 2016)
