= Kibi Province =

Former province of Japan

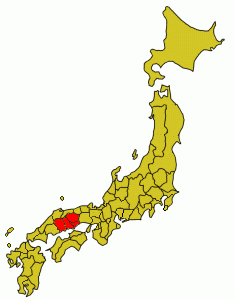
Map of Japanese provinces with Kibi highlighted

Kibi Province (吉備国, Kibi no Kuni; Japanese pronunciation: [kʲiꜜ.bʲi (no kɯ.ɲi)]) was an ancient province or region of Japan, in the same area as Okayama Prefecture and eastern Hiroshima Prefecture. It was sometimes called Bishū (備州).

It was divided into Bizen (備前), Bitchū (備中), and Bingo (備後) Provinces in the late 7th century, and Mimasaka Province was separated from Bizen Province in the 8th century. The first three provinces took a kanji from the name of Kibi, and added zen, chū, and go ("near," "middle," and "far") according to their distance from the capital region.

== See also ==
- Kingdom of Kibi
