= John W. Dower =

American historian (born 1938)

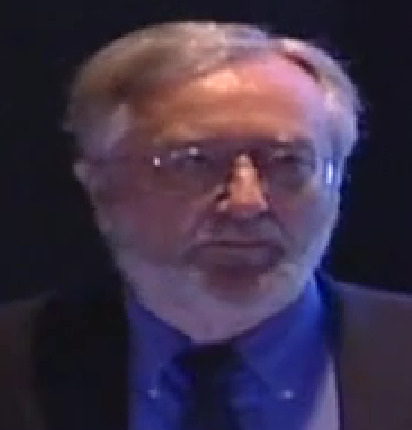
- Dower in 2005
- Born: June 21, 1938 (age 88); Providence, Rhode Island, U.S.
- Occupation: Historian
- Awards: Pulitzer Prize for General Nonfiction; Bancroft Prize; John K. Fairbank Prize; National Book Critics Circle Award; L.L. Winship/PEN New England Award; Mellon Distinguished Achievement Award

Academic background
- Education: Amherst College; Harvard University

Academic work
- Discipline: History
- Sub-discipline: History of Japan, United States–Japan relations
- Institutions: University of Wisconsin–Madison University of California, San Diego Massachusetts Institute of Technology
- Doctoral students: Laura Hein
- Notable works: War Without Mercy: Race and Power in the Pacific War (1986) Embracing Defeat: Japan in the Wake of World War II (1999)

John W. Dower (born June 21, 1938, in Providence, Rhode Island) is an American author and historian. His 1999 book Embracing Defeat: Japan in the Wake of World War II won the U.S. National Book Award for Nonfiction, the Pulitzer Prize for General Nonfiction, the Bancroft Prize, the Los Angeles Times Book Prize, the Mark Lynton History Prize, and the John K. Fairbank Prize of the American Historical Association.

== Career ==
Dower earned a bachelor's degree in American Studies from Amherst College in 1959, and a PhD in History and Far Eastern Languages from Harvard University in 1972, where he studied under Albert M. Craig. He expanded his doctoral dissertation, a biography of former Japanese Prime Minister Shigeru Yoshida, into the book Empire and Aftermath. His other books include a selection of writings by E. Herbert Norman and a study of mutual images during World War II entitled War Without Mercy.

Dower was the executive producer of the Academy Award-nominated documentary Hellfire: A Journey from Hiroshima, and was a member of the Committee of Concerned Asian Scholars, sitting on the editorial board of its journal with Noam Chomsky, and Herbert Bix. He has taught at the University of Wisconsin–Madison and the University of California, San Diego, and is a Ford International Professor of History, emeritus, at Massachusetts Institute of Technology (MIT).

=== Visualizing Cultures ===
"Visualizing Cultures", a course that Dower has taught at MIT since 2003, with Shigeru Miyagawa, discusses how images shape American and Japanese societies. The Visualizing Cultures website features some 18 scholars in over 40 units based on digitized image sets from the visual record. The project was recognized by MIT with the "Class of 1960 Innovation in Education Award" in 2004 and in 2005, the National Endowment for the Humanities selected VC for inclusion on "EDSITEment" as an online resource for education in the humanities. The curriculum on the website for the Canton Trade unit won the 2011 "Franklin R. Buchanan prize from the Association of Asian Studies for best curricular materials concerning Asia."

The first Visualizing Cultures unit, "Black Ships & Samurai," written by John Dower, juxtaposed the visual record from the two sides of the 1853–1854 encounter when Commodore Matthew Perry of the United States arrived in Japan aboard the "Black Ships" (steam powered gunboats) to force that long-secluded country to open its borders to the outside world.

In April 2006, the OpenCourseWare website of "Visualizing Cultures" was announced on the main page of the MIT website, causing a stir among some Chinese students at MIT that found the material offensive. The material included woodblock prints produced in Japan as propaganda during the Chinese-Japanese War of 1894–1895 that portrayed Japanese soldiers beheading "violent Chinese soldiers." The Japanese-born Miyagawa received death threats. In response, the authors temporarily removed the course from OpenCourseWare and released a statement, as did the MIT Administration. After a week, the course authors agreed to include additional context in controversial sections, and put the course back online.

== Awards and honors ==
- 1986: National Book Critics Circle Award, War Without Mercy: Race and Power in the Pacific War
- 2000: Pulitzer Prize for General Nonfiction, Embracing Defeat: Japan in the Wake of World War II
- 2000: L.L. Winship/PEN New England Award, Embracing Defeat: Japan in the Wake of World War II
- 2000: Bancroft Prize, Embracing Defeat: Japan in the Wake of World War II
- Mellon Distinguished Achievement Award
- 2007: elected to the American Philosophical Society

== Selected works ==
=== Books ===
- Origins of the Modern Japanese State: Selected Writings of E.H. Norman (1975; Pantheon; ISBN 0-394-70927-6)
- War Without Mercy: Race and Power in the Pacific War (1986; Pantheon; ISBN 0-394-75172-8)
- Empire and Aftermath: Yoshida Shigeru and the Japanese experience, 1878–1954 (1988; Harvard University Press; ISBN 0-674-25126-1)
- Japan in War and Peace: Selected Essays (1995; New Press; ISBN 1-56584-279-0)
- "The Bombed: Hiroshima and Nagasaki in Japanese Memory", Diplomatic History 19, no. 2 (Spring 1995)
- Embracing Defeat: Japan in the Wake of World War II (1999; W. W. Norton) — winner of the National Book Award, John K. Fairbank Prize of the American Historical Association, and Pulitzer Prize
- Cultures of War: Pearl Harbor, Hiroshima, 9-11, Iraq (New York: Norton : New Press, 2010; ISBN 978-0-393-06150-5).
- Ways of Forgetting, Ways of Remembering: Japan in the Modern World (The New Press, 2011)
- The Violent American Century: War and Terror Since World War II (Haymarket Books, 2017; ISBN 1608467236).

=== Interviews and presentations ===
- Dower, John; Lawrence, Patrick (2019). "Japan and the United States: Reflections on War, Empire, Race, and Culture" (PDF). Japan Focus. 17.
